= Mario Bernasconi (sculptor) =

Swiss-Italian sculptor (1899–1963)

- Born: February 13, 1899; Pazzallo
- Died: March 19, 1963 (aged 64); Viganello

Mario Bernasconi (Pazzallo, February 13, 1899 – Viganello, March 19, 1963) was a Swiss-Italian sculptor.

== Biography ==
Mario Bernasconi was born in 1899 in Lugano-Pazzallo, in the home facing the Museum. He was the son of Luigi Bernasconi (electrician) and Caterina Dozio (seamstress). He grew up with his sister Maria (Nini), who was two years younger.

He was attracted to what he called "la mia montagna" (my mountain) – San Salvatore. On the mountain, he discovered clay and received his first inspirations. During his childhood, beside the school there was the country life. He brought home lizards, snakes, insects of every kind, which he studied and observed attentively.

=== Work and study ===
1914 – Once the obligatory schools terminated and having to learn a trade, Mario worked in a pharmacy in Lugano. In the evening he posed as a model in the studio of the sculptor Luigi Vassalli. Captured by the arts, Mario left the pharmacy and became a student of Luigi Vassalli (monument to Carlo Battaglini). He appears as the angel-like figure in the monument. In addition to posing and performing hard work, he learned the art of moulding, design in relief, and the study of the human body. In carving marble and shaping clay he was more than ever convinced to become a sculptor. 1917 – Mario continued his studies by the painter and sculptor Giuseppe Foglia and started his own studio in Pazzallo, in the house that is now the Mario Bernasconi Museum. In his studies, Mario was deeply inspired by Michelangelo, Donatello, Rodin, Maillol and Lehmbruck.

=== Early works and scholarships ===
Mario obtained the first Federal scholarship that was renewed for three consecutive years:

1921 – the mask La scema (the idiot)

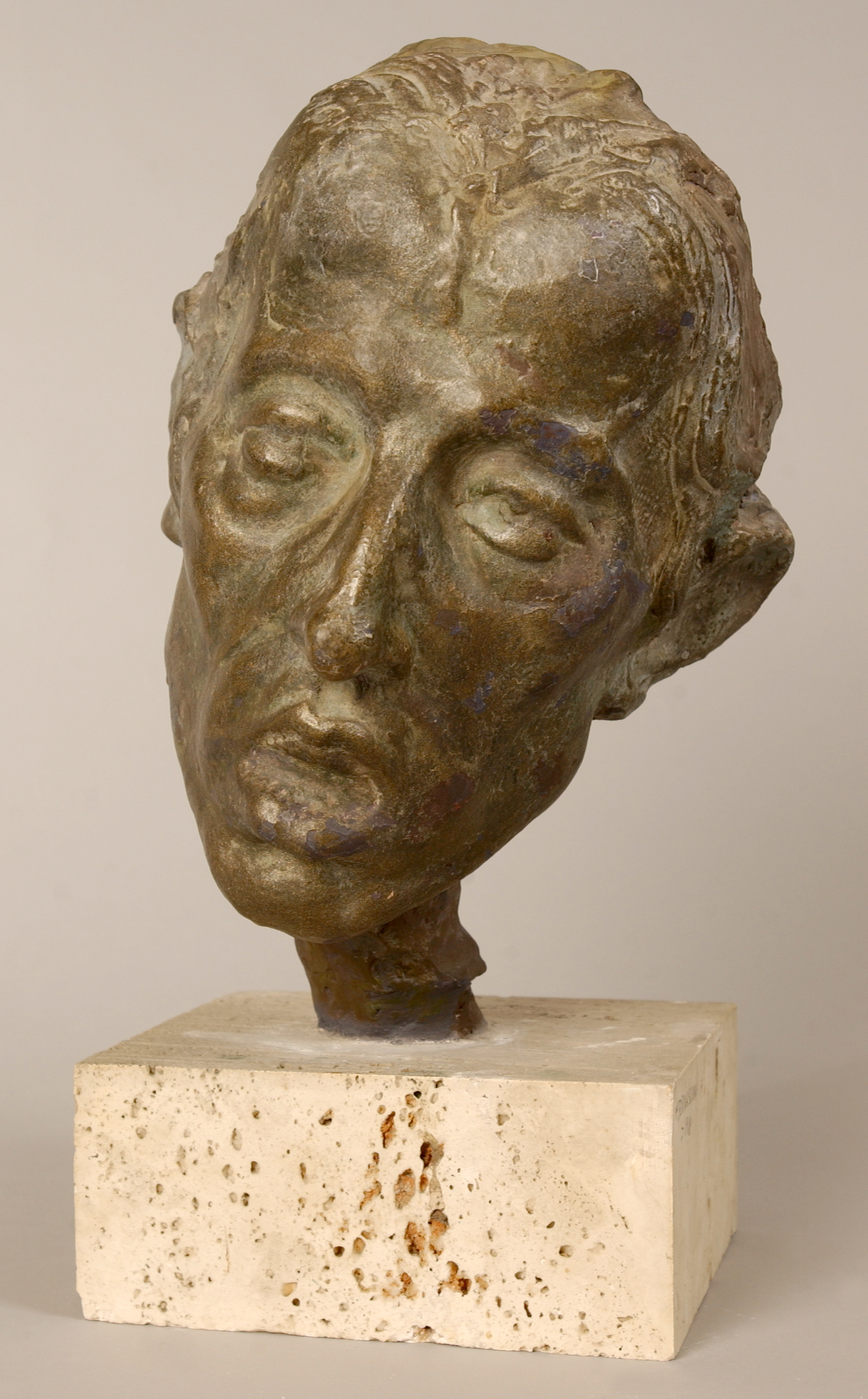
La Scema – early work

1922 – the portraits of "Enea" and "Eva".

1923 – the bust "La giovane madre" Mario with the young Mother

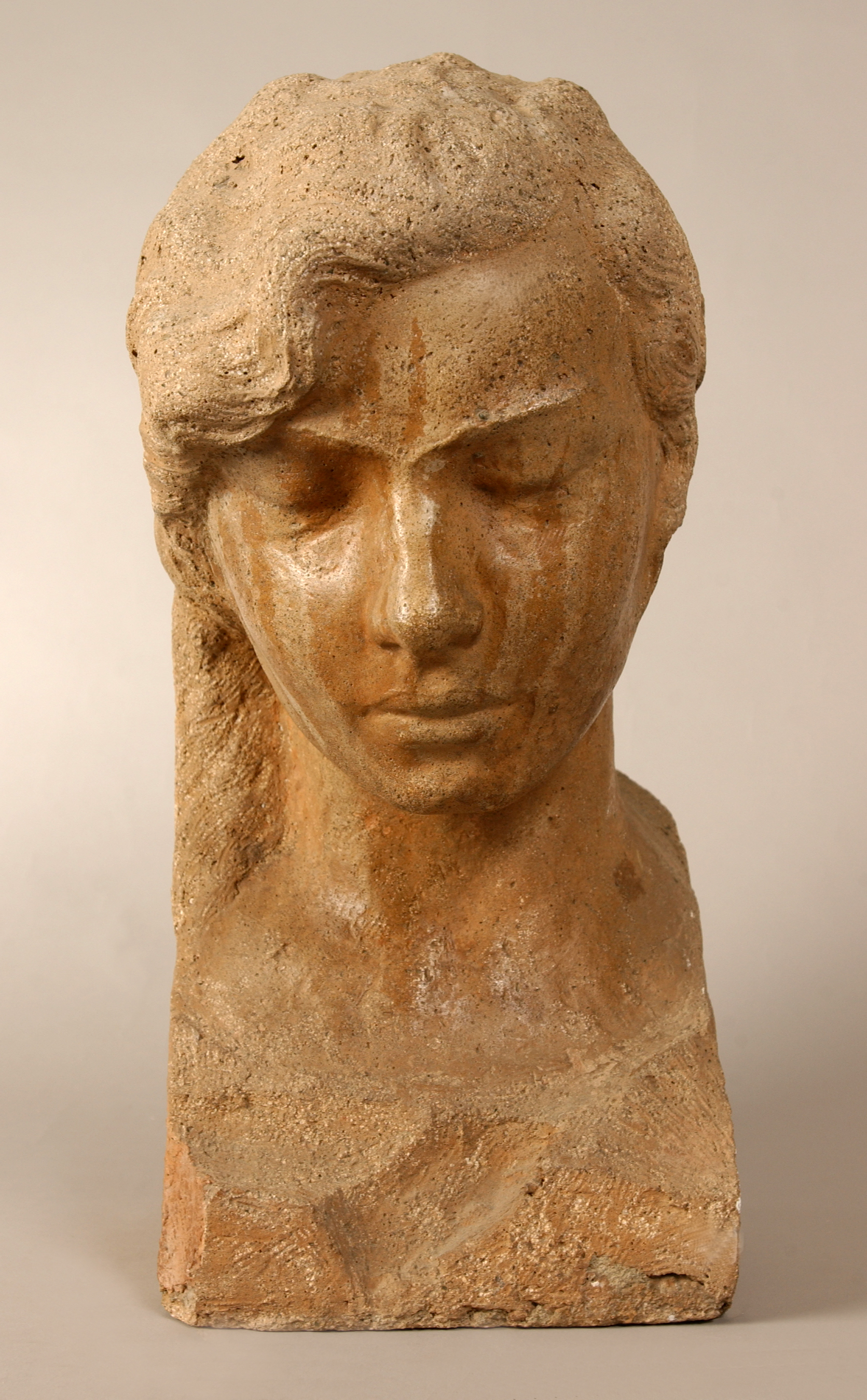
Ritratto_di_Eva – early work

.

He made portraits of his friends, among them Angelo Tonello, the painters Filippo Boldini, Gualtiero Colombo, the writers Vinicio Salati Francesco Manzoni and Silvio Calloni the naturalist from Pazzallo.

He created the head of "Cristo" (Christ) that stands atop the steps of San Pietro Pambio Cemetery, at the center of the big stone cross.

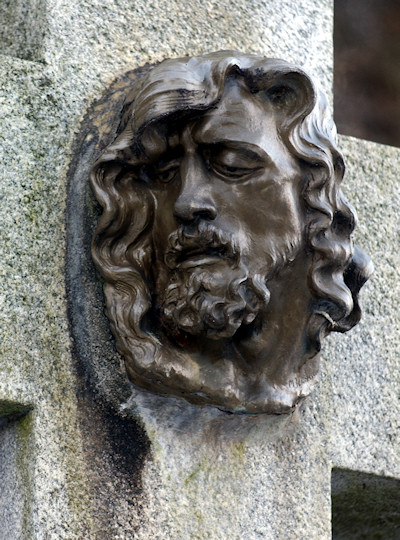
Christ

1923 – His mother became ill and died. A period of inertia followed, but it's the portrait of his mother that brought back his creativity.

1925– At the National Exhibition of Fine Art at the Kunsthaus Zurich, the Federal Government acquired the statue "Il Curato di campagna" (The country Priest) and donated the bronze to the city of Lugano

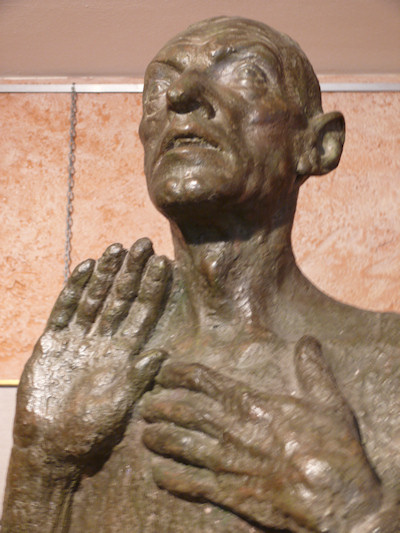
Detail of the country priest

The full plaster figure can be seen at the Museum in Pazzallo. On June 13, 1926, in New York, on the Daily News of the workers of America, "The New World" in the center of the front page appears the reproduction of the sculpture "Il Martire" (The Martyr) by Mario Bernasconi. It was Giacomo Matteotti, which in New York on that day, the second year of his death was commemorated. Bernasconi later donated this sculpture to the Chamber of Labor in Lugano.

=== Career, character, marriage and travel ===
The artist demonstrates to be a free-thinker, a great lover of nature, mystic, philosopher, intuitive, poet, romantic. His family and friends considered him to be gentle and having a good character, a bit narcissistic, sentimental and emotional. Sometimes argumentative at times revolutionary and remembered for his motto "Lottare per non morire" (Fight not to die).

Of the encounter with friends, writes Francesco Manzoni in the volume "Mario Bernasconi Scultore" Editions Aurora, Lugano:

"Then the political rounds would break loose and Mario wearing the Valiere tie, was singing Bandiera Rossa (Red Flag) and the hymn to the anarchists or he would play them on the mouth accordion, his face assuming a faun flavor whereby his authentic faith was affirmed without reservation: perhaps with great anger, that sometimes had the epic of Brecht and when cooled off, ended with the recitation of a scarlet "Ca ira."

Matured by the strong impression of the Egyptian sculptures, Greek and Roman, the Renaissance, the neo-Gothic of Lehmbruck, the realism of Rodin, Mario Bernasconi found his own style. For art studies, he gives preference to the cities of Siena and Florence (Firenze) and he continues his formation through contact with artists and intellectuals. Works in central Switzerland, Zurich, Bern and Glarus.

1927 marked the beginning of a rich and successful artistic career (reference: Le sculture all'aperto nella città di Lugano, page 115, Biography).

Through the von Alvensleben family of Porza, Mario met Irma Pannes, a descendant of a distinguished German family who later became his wife. The newlyweds departed for Germany, making their first stops in Freiburg, Darmstadt, and Wiesbaden.

Mario then met with Werneralvo von Alvensleben in Berlin for the first Porza Association exhibition on December 9, 1927. While waiting for a studio in Berlin, he and his wife traveled to Reichenbach in Silesia before visiting Prague, a city rich in art.

As a Swiss-Italian co-founder of the Porza Association—alongside Werner von Alvensleben and the Russian painter Arthur Bryks—Mario participated in the inauguration of their second exhibition on March 25, 1928, in Berlin.

.

The period in Berlin turns out to be the most useful and prolific of his career, especially for the contacts that the friendly atmosphere permits him to establish and for the friendly relations with leading personalities of the artistic, scientific and literary world. With enthusiasm, he makes the portrait of the German writer Carl Zuckmayer while he made a drawing of the sculptor at work. He becomes friend with Erich Maria Remarque, who at that time worked on the famous novel "Im Westen nichts Neues". He meets La Jana(actress)Jana the famous dancer of the Thirties, makes the portrait of the actress Elisabeth Lennartz Elisabeth Lennartz takes part in the "Grosse Berliner Kunst Austellung 1928". In Potsdam at the Gutmann estate/Villa he spends a period of great prosperity with the family of the Banker Gutmann (director of the Dresden Bank) where he creates the portraits of the banker, his wife Daisy and their two children and a sculpture for their park estate.

The following trips take him to Krefeld the birth-city of his wife, Duesseldorf, Frankfurt on the Main, Munich in Bavaria, Breslavia and Paris where another "Porza" home was erected. In those cities, he created and left numerous artworks.

=== Return to Ticino ===
1929–1933 – The artist returned to Ticino with his Irma and rented a home in Sala Capriasca From his artistic standpoint what he wanted to achieve was the static, a balanced and contained movement emanating silence. Several works were created: "Il busto di Irma" (bust of Irma) a Federal purchase that can be seen Martin Disteli Museum of Olten. In 1931 he created: "La Preghiera" (The Prayer) for the tomb in the cemetery of San Pietro Pambio, of the family Ostilio Foglia. The statue of L'Asceta,(The Ascetic) that of The Adolescent. The various "Torso" and the many nude studies. The portraits of that period between Sala and Zurich are: Professor Max Huber president of the International Tribunal in The Hague. Professor Emilio Motta al Liceo di Lugano. Professor Angelo Pizzorno Liceo di Lugano. Pastor Nicolas-Boldt, writer in Lugaggia; Professor Gogarten of the University of Jena; Cornelia Forster; Emil Mauser, industrial from Zurich.

In 1933 he took part in the Exposition SPSAS at the Kunsthaus Zurich and at the Staatliche Kunstaustellung Munich. Many artists and friends from Berlin and Zurich came to visit his home in Sala Capriasca. From the book "Mario Bernasconi Scultore" Editions Aurora Lugano, Vinicio Salati writes in "L'amico" (Friend):"From this couple of artists, new forces are resumed. "A young Russian artist wrote:"... for me and many of my friends, Sala is like a pilgrimage."

The artist wished to purchase the house but the owner declined to sell it. As a result, they had to leave residence that was their home and a gathering place for many international artists. They found temporary residence in Montarina above Lugano, at the Villa Beausite.

1934 – At the Villa Beausite his sister's son, L'Adolescente (The Adolescent), Giuseppe (Teti) is posing for him. A slender boy figure, of which there are several statues that represent him, such as the bronze on the museum facade in Pazzallo.

1935 – Portrait of the famous pianist Claudio Arrau, that poses for him at the Villa Beausite. The setting of the great bronze statue "La donna distesa" (The reclining woman) at the Carona cemetery.

Travel in Italy, especially Tuscany, Florence and Siena. A trip to Bad Godesberg, Germany where he created the statue of "St. Anthony" for the Marienheim.

1936 – Rents a home in the center of Cureglia, remaining there for 25 years. The home is of the 1500s. It belongs to the Fontana family and it had always been a home and gathering place for artists. The last tenant, before Bernasconi lived there, was the painter Ernesto Fontana, who lived in Milan, and occupied the home in Cureglia during the warm seasons. The building, filled with relief and stucco work, was always visited by artists who left signatures, writings and poems on the veranda walls.

1937 – Birth of daughter Claudia and the sculptor makes the portrait when the baby is 13 days old. The bronze "Neonata" (Newborn) is at the Government building in Bellinzona.

1939 – Completes the project of Cristo (Christ) for the family Rickenbach tomb in Schwyz. Takes part at the great exhibition, Landesaustellung Zurich where he creates before the public.

=== Awards and Prestigious Appointments ===
Bernasconi finds a large studio in Lugano, along the Cassarate river, where companion artists work such as Boldini, Ribola, Moglia, Ardnoldi and others.

1942 – Federal acquisition of the portrait Francesco Chiesa portrait at the Palazzo Comunale in Castagnola.

1943 – Mario Bernasconi presents four projects for the Madonna that will be placed in front of the San Lorenzo Cathedral in Lugano. The competition is organized by Pro Helvetia. Over forty-six participating sculptors, Mario is the winner with the "Virgo Potens" project. He meets Amelia Anastasi Quadri, a pianist from Lugano, who was discovered and encouraged as a child, by Giacomo Puccini. She poses as a model for the statue of the Madonna.

1945 – Another Federal acquisition is the portrait of "Cornelia".

1946 – The great statue of the Madonna di San Lorenzo commissioned by Pro Helvetia and the city of Lugano, executed in fine Saltrio marble, also referred to as Virgo Potens is inaugurated and placed in the courtyard of the San Lorenzo Cathedral overlooking the city of Lugano. The speech is held by Francesco Chiesa Luigi Caglio of that artwork exalted in: "L'affermazione dei valori della vita" "The affirmation of life's values"

"Among the values of life that Mario Bernasconi was a firm believer, was a religiosity that without being subject to discipline, without making a profession of faith in certain dogmas, is indisputable. This spiritual position came to light in the statue of the Madonna that stands in front of the Cathedral of San Lorenzo. Of all the verses of the litany, the artist chose the one that most reflected his intentions. "Virgo Potens". The woman who has been shaken and trembled at the Annunciation, the Mother who generated the divine infant in the squalor of the Bethlehem stable, the one who will be torn from the atrocious sufferings inflicted on the Son, this statue symbolizes a vigorous vitality. Seeing her, one is induced to enter the word robur (fortress) in the Salve Regina, where Mary is pleaded as life dulcedo et spes nostra. "

His works have seen and endured many moves and travels in Switzerland and abroad.

1947–1949 – Again the sculptor is without a workshop. He is offered a studio in the village of Vezia. He survives by creating funerary art.

1950 – Creates Il Tobiolo (Boy with fish) for the school fountain in Massagno:: The statue "La Dolente" (The Sufferer) for Family Poretti tomb, Lugano cemetery.

The statue "Fanciulla con fiammella" (Girl with the light) for Family Ammon tomb, Lugano cemetery.

1951 – He finds a large Atelier (workshop) in the building of the Italian Consulate, at Via Dufour in Lugano. There he stays and works for the rest of his life.

1952 – Creates the great relief "Demeter" for the Franchini Residence in Lugano.

The statue "Il Lavoratore" (The Worker) for Family Laurenti tomb in Carabbia.
A second bronze of The Worker is placed in 1981, at the Cittadella square in Cureglia, facing the home where the artist lived for 25 years.

1953 – He delivers to the Agricultural Institute of Mezzana, the mighty statue Seminatore (The Sower). This work of art was commissioned by President Etter and is the property of the State and Canton Ticino art collection.

In the same year he creates the statue, "Nicolao della Flue" (Nicholas of Flue) for the main square of Neggio.

1954 – Creates the statue the Risveglio, which was placed in 1981 in the Belvedere Park by Lake Lugano, along with artworks by other famous artists.

1955 – Inauguration in Bever (Engadine) of "Pastorello con pecora" (Sheperd with sheep) and a second one dedicated to the "Marmotte".

1956 – Inauguration of the Acquaiola (The Water carrier) on the Quai of Paradiso in the center of the fountain.

Regarding the Water-carrier a very positive critique appeared, on March 9, 1956 by Prof. Charly Clerc, entitled: "Sculpteur tessinois" on the front page of the Journal de Geneve, here translated from French:

"Mario Bernasconi is a fine and original artist who has worked hard. The projects in his studio stand to demonstrate not only a distinguished artist but a great artist"

Soon in Paradiso the inauguration will take place of the young girl that draws water from the fountain, that is an ensemble of gentleness, grace and grandeur."

On the ACQUAIOLA the painter Mario Guberti Helfricht from Ravenna, on the invitation for the centenary celebration of Mario Bernasconi 1899–1999 by the city of Lugano responded expressing as follows (in the Italian language) :

"L'opera riprodotta e' un capolavoro, un vero inno alla bellezza femminile, quale solo un grande artista poteva fare."

English translation: "The ACQUAIOLA is a masterpiece, a true hymn to female beauty, as only a great artist could do"

1960–1963 – The company Baylender of Milan, asks Mario Bernasconi to create, for the centennial occasion of the Kleinewefers company in Germany, the statue Il Genio del lavoro (Genius der Arbeit)

Mario successfully finishes the artwork.

For the Pedrinis establishment, he creates the relief (his last work) "Il mercato di Lugano" (Lugano's market) the third panel remained unfinished.

Mario Bernasconi died the morning of March 19, 1963, at the Italian Hospital in Viganello, a day after the death of his sister. The double funeral takes place on March 21, at the cemetery of San Pietro Pambio. The Government officials of the "Dicastero della Cultura" were present with Aldo Patocchi, President of the "Societa' Ticinese delle Belle Arti". Vinicio Salati and Cesco Manzoni, two faithful friends to the end, gave a farewell speech.

"The artwork and the personality of Mario Bernasconi, one of the maximum sculptors of the period, have not yet been the object of deep studies, which constitutes a serious gap for the comprehension of the southern Swiss artistic reality of the first half of the 20th century." quote by Elisabeth Voyame translated from the Italian on Arte in Ticino, categoria arte 2003, third volume, page 330, article 112.

by Rudy Chiappini, Salvioni editor.

At that time a decision was made by his daughter to create a Museum to collect and preserve his artworks.

=== Exhibitions ===
1920 – Bernasconi shows his works at the Museo Villa Ciani Lugano for the exhibitions of the Societa' Ticinese delle Belle Arti.

From the local Exhibits, he passes to the Confederate centers to the Turnus, open at the Kunsthaus Zurich. From there, his presence remains constant to the end.

1925 – Kunsthaus Zurich. National Fine Art Exhibition.

1927 – First exhibit with the "Porza Association" in Berlin, Germany.

1928 – Second exhibit with the "Porza Association" in Berlin with Max Dungert, Edward Matare, Käthe Kollwitz, Alexej Jawlensky, Yves Klein, Georg Muche, Marianne von Werefkin, Nicolay Wassillieff, Christof Drexel, Oswald Herzog, Lothar Homeyer, Arthur Segal and Carl Zuckmayer, one of the most well known in the field of theater and music.

In the same year, Mario Bernasconi participates at the Grosse Berliner Kunstaustellung 1928.

1930 – Gallery Aktuarius Zurich, with Maurice Utrillo, Maurice de Vlaminck, Anders Zorn and Max Oppenheimer.

1932 – Kunsthaus Zurich and Museum Winterthur with Hedy Giger, Margarete Goetz, Charles Hug, W. Meier, E. Morgenthaler, E. Perinciolli.

1933 – Kunsthaus Zurich exhibition of the SPSAS

1933 – State Exhibition of Munich in Bavaria.

1934 – Aktuarius Gallery Zurich, with Cuno Amiet, Maurice Barraud, Blanchet, Epper, Griser, Giacometti, Hermann Haller and Hubacher.

1935 – Kunsthaus Zurich, where Mario is the only exhibiting sculptor from Southern Switzerland.

1937 - Art Museum Bern. La Nazionale.

1938 – Kunsthalle Bern. Arte Ticinese.

1939 – Landi, (Landesausstellung) Zurich. Swiss National Exhibition, Mario Bernasconi and Alexander Soldenhoff create in front of a large public.

1944 -Kunsthalle Basel with S.P.S.A.S. Societa' Ticinese delle Belle Arti, Lugano.

1952 – Personal Exhibition at the Casa d'Italia (Italian Consulate) in Lugano. Societa' Ticinese delle Belle Arti, Lugano.

1964 and 1969 – Museum Villa Ciani Personal exhibition Mario Bernasconi and Irma Bernasconi Pannes

1971 – Posthumous show Attilio Balmelli, Giordano Passera and Irma Bernasconi Pannes at the Civico Museo d'Arte Villa Ciani, Lugano

1981 – A Museum has been opened in Pazzallo-Lugano with the works of Mario Bernasconi, his wife Irma Pannes and numerous works by contemporary artists friends. The city named the Piazza where the Museum is located Piazzetta Mario Bernasconi. The home close to the Museum where the artist was born has been restored and has on display all the artworks of Mario in his younger years. The Museum and casa natale can be visited with free admission.

== View Gallery ==
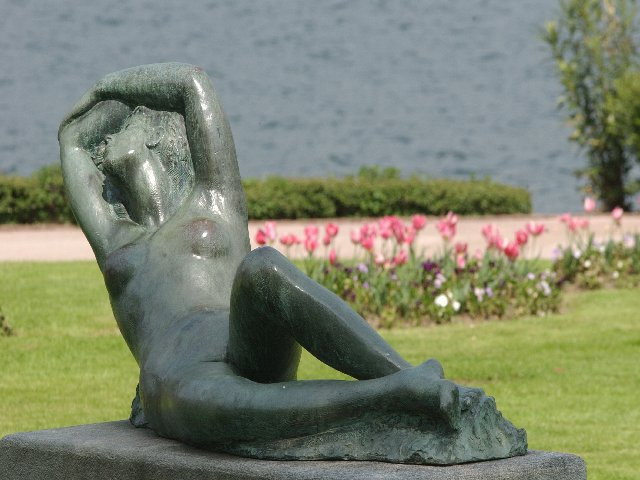
Risveglio

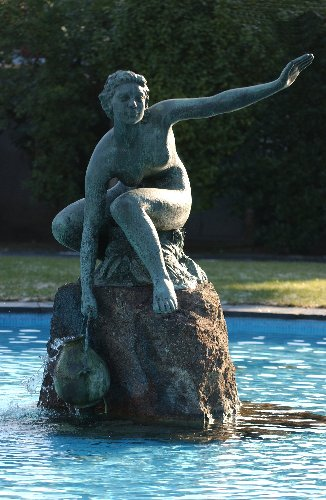
The water carrier

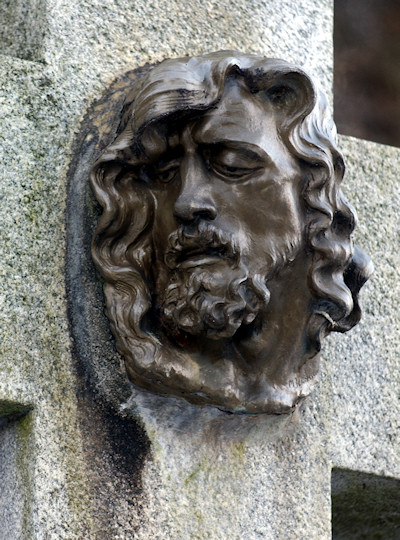
Christ

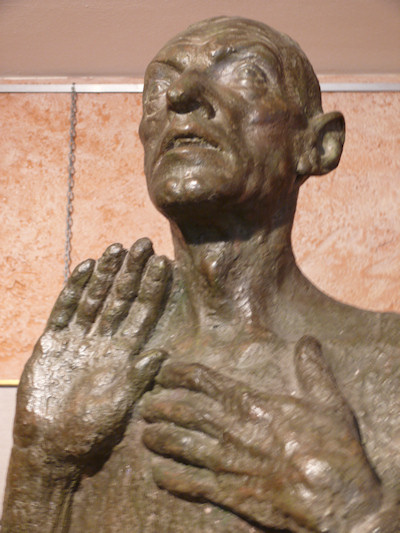
Detail of the country Priest

== The Porza Association ==
In 1923, in the village of Porza (above Lugano), the German Baron Werner Alvo von Alvensleben, the Russian painter Arthur Bryks and the Swiss Italian sculptor Mario Bernasconi, visionaries of the Porza idea, gather to discuss and plan the Porza Association whose purpose is to help artists. In 1927–1929, the Porza Association is founded and becomes a very successful International movement based in Berlin spreading rapidly to other major European cities.

In Paris the "Porza Association" is represented by the great personality that was Jacques Vienot. Jocelyne Leboeuf writes: "Internationalisme et Humanisme, apres la premiere guerre mondiale (after the first world war), "l'Association Porza" (The Association Porza) et De l'idee a la forme,(from the idea to the development) exposition Porza,Musee Galliera (Museum Galliera, Fashion Museum of the city of Paris) 1939". The Porza association recently described by Elena Spoerl on the newspaper La Regione, June 2, 2012 The Porza association recently described by Dalmazio Ambrosoli

== Events ==
- December 5, 1981 marks the day of the inauguration in Pazzallo of the Museo dedicated to Mario Bernasconi. Present at the opening are the authorities of Pazzallo and Lugano and representatives of the Swiss Italian culture. The Pazzallo community dedicates the Square on which the Museum stands to Mario Bernasconi: "Piazzetta Mario Bernasconi". The private Museum that preserves and displays the plaster works, the terracotta's and bronzes, is open to the public with free admission.
- In the early 80s, the municipals of Lugano came to Pazzallo with the Honorable Mayor Arch. Giorgio Giudici for the selection of an artwork. They chose the "Il Risveglio" (The Awakening) which was placed in bronze in the Belvedere Park, on lake Lugano.
- In the mid 80s the bronze statue of "Il lavoratore" (The worker) was placed at the Cittadella in Cureglia where the artist lived for 25 years.
- In 1983 the patinated plaster figure of the "Il Curato di campagna"( The country Priest), located in the Museum of Pazzallo, was transported to the Federal Palace in Bern for the exhibition of the Swiss Italian sculptors.
- On February 13, 1999 (one hundred years after his birth), the official reopening of the museum took place, with a Ceremony by the "Gruppo Culturale e Ricreativo" of Pazzallo and by the Town authorities. On the occasion of the centenary the Swiss TV station RSI (radio e televisione della Svizzera italiana) made a documentary video on their "REGIONALE" describing the artworks in the Mario Bernasconi Museum.
- On June 19, 1999 for the Centenary of Mario Bernasconi the real Commemoration in itself took place in Pazzallo with an event that brought together authorities, families, people and artists.
- In 2000 Mr. van Ouwerkerk of Sorengo donated the stone statue of the Narciso (Narcissus) to the Museum of Pazzallo. The artwork was created by Mario Bernasconi in 1947, for Weber & Blauer.
- On May 21, 2005 the opening took place of the birth home of the sculptor, exhibiting the works of the Twenties with drawings, stories, photographs and personal objects of the sculptor. The opening brings together authorities, relatives and people, with introduction and speech by the authorities of Lugano, Aurelio Longoni and Remo Mocetti. For this occasion the Swiss Television RSI (radio televisione della Svizzera italiana) films the Museum.
- On September 4, 2013 the city of Lugano celebrated the 50th anniversary of the death of the sculptor.

Television Programs:

- RSI, Swiss Italian radio and television program (1999) "Il Regionale" on YouTube Zoe Salati for the centenary of Mario Bernasconi.
- RSI, Swiss Italian radio and television program (Nov 28, 2005) "Il Quotidiano" on YouTube Simona Ostinelli: Mario Bernasconi, Museo and Casa natale.
- Swiss Italian Television Program April 2013 Video Simona Ostinelli A casa di Mario

Historians, Art Critics, Journalists and Writers:

- Mario Agliati, historian, art critic, journalist, writer. "Cantonetto" (Nov. 2005) "Mario da Pazzallo, scultore eccellente".
- Giuseppe Curonici, art critic, journalist, writer. "Corriere del Ticino".
- Giuseppe Curonici, introduction to the volume Mario Bernasconi, Salvioni 2005

Books published:

- Professor Carlo Silla(1997) "Il Comune di Paradiso con la sua gente e la Parrocchia di S.Pietro Pambio", Aurora SA, Lugano Canobbio.
- Rudy Chiappini, Dicastero Arte e Cultura (2003) 4 volumi serie Arte in Ticino 1803–2003, Salvioni Arti Grafiche Bellinzona.
- Edizioni Citta' di Lugano, Dicastero Musei e cultura della citta' di Lugano (May 1986), Le sculture all'aperto nella citta di Lugano.
- Claudia Esposito (1977) "Mario Bernasconi Scultore", Published in the US by J. Mark Press.
- The book has 4 co-authors: "La vita e i suoi pensieri" by Claudia Esposito, "L'amico" by Vinicio Salati "Affermazione dei valori della vita" by Luigi Caglio, "Ricordo di uno scultore" by Cesco Manzoni, Mario Bernasconi Scultore, Edizioni Aurora Lugano, 1981.
- Claudia Esposito, Mario Bernasconi, Salvioni Edizioni, 2005, with introduction by Giuseppe Curonici, and preface by Mario Agliati, ISBN 88-7967-120-0.
- Stefano Vassere, Archivio di Stato del Canton Ticino, Bellinzona (2011) "Archivio dei nomi di luogo", Sala Capriasca ISBN 978-88-96200-06-3.
- Cesare Mazzucconi-Lugano, Storia di Porza, Cesare Mazzucconi-Lugano Tip., 1930.
- Piero Trupia, Perche' e' bello cio che e' bello Published in Italy by Franco Angeli

Journalists and Critics:

- Vinicio Salati libro 1981 book: "Mario Bernasconi scultore" section: "L'amico", Aurora SA Lugano-Canobbio.
- Luigi Caglio, newspaper: Corriere del Ticino (Sep 15, 1981) "Quasi ultimato a Pazzallo il Museo Mario Bernasconi" book: "Mario Bernasconi scultore" section: "Ricordo di uno scultore", Aurora SA Lugano-Canobbio.
- Luciana Caglio, Newspaper: Corriere del Ticino (June 21, 1999) "Pazzallo e il suo scultore, per l'artista una piazza, un Museo ed un sito internet".

Published newspaper articles:

- Journal de Geneve.
- Libera Stampa (March 4, 1921) Lugano.
- Neue Zuricher Zeitung(May 1, 1924) Zurich.
- Il nuovo mondo (June 13, 1926) "Il Martire", New York, N.Y.
- Libera Stampa (June 10, 1926), "Matteotti morente", Lugano.
- Illustrazione Ticinese (Dec. 26, 1932) Lugano, Ulisse Pocobelli (Glauco)
- Corriere del Ticino (Nov. 20, 1934) "Nota d'Arte", Lugano.
- Gazzetta Ticinese (Nov. 20, 1934) "Nota d'Arte", Lugano.
- Dovere (Nov. 20, 1934), "Nota d'Arte" Bellinzona.
- Illustrazione Ticinese (Mar. 2, 1935) Pino Bernasconi.
- Zuercher Illustrierte Landes Austellung (July 21, 1939) Zurich.
- Rassegna Ticinese (June 26, 1943) "Madonna di San Lorenzo".
- Libera Stampa, L. Luzzato (June 24, 1982) Mario Bernasconi:"L'uomo e l'artista in un libro e in un Museo".
- Sued Schweiz (July 23, 1983)Z.Y. "Die gedenkstaette fuer den Bildhauer Mario Bernasconi in Pazzallo" Lugano und Umgebung.
- Coups d'Oeil (Sep. 18,1993) Marie Claire von Alvensleben, numero 18, page 17, "Le Musee Mario Bernasconi", Geneve.
- Rivista di Lugano (February 12, 1999) Raimondo Locatelli "Mario Bernasconi, lo scultore di Pazzallo".
- Rivista di Lugano (June 21, 1999) Luciana Caglio "Pazzallo e il suo scultore, per l'artista una piazza, un Museo ed un sito internet".
- La Regione (Jan.15, 2009) Elena Spoerl, "Pazzallo nasconde nel cuore un Museo d’Arte", Lugano.
- Rivista di Lugano, Ersilia Tettamanti and Mario Agliati Articolo 14 Ottobre,2011
- La Regione (June 2,2012) Elena Spoerl, LA PORZA
- La Regione (Ott.13,2012) Elena Spoerl, L'Asceta e' bello perche' e' bello...interiormente.
- Agenda Lugano Museo Mario Bernasconi
