= Mario Bernasconi =

Mario Bernasconi may refer to:

- Mario Bernasconi (general) (1892–1976), Italian general
- Mario Bernasconi (sculptor) (1899–1963), Swiss-Italian sculptor
