= Monte San Salvatore funicular =

Funicular railway in Ticino, Switzerland

Coordinates: 45.983128°N 8.945961°E

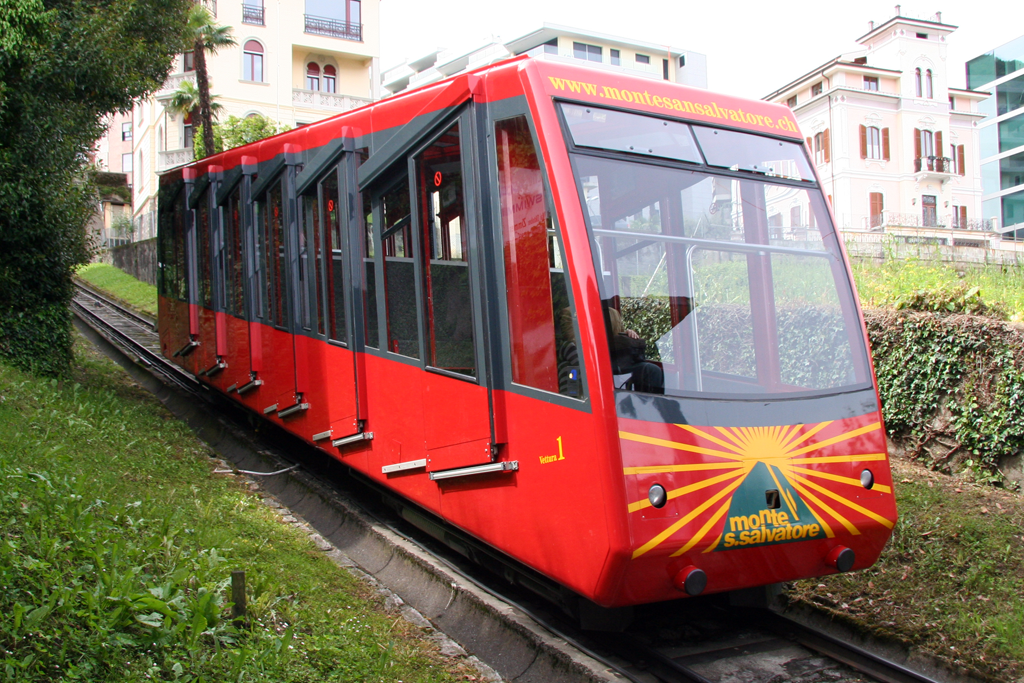
- Lower section car (2010)

Overview
- Status: in operation
- Owner: Funicolare Lugano-Paradiso-Monte San Salvatore SA
- Locale: Ticino, Switzerland
- Termini: "Lugano-Paradiso (S. Salvatore)"; "Monte San Salvatore"
- Stations: 4 (including "Pazzallo")

Service
- Type: funicular with 2 sections
- Operator(s): Funicolare Lugano-Paradiso-Monte San Salvatore SA
- Rolling stock: 2 (1 on each section, for 60 passengers each)

History
- Opened: 27 March 1890 (135 years ago)

Technical
- Track length: 1,630 metres (5,350 ft)
- Rack system: (before 1926: Abt)
- Track gauge: Metre (3 ft 3 3/8 in)
- Electrification: from opening
- Maximum incline: 61%

The Monte San Salvatore funicular, or Funicolare Monte San Salvatore, is a funicular railway in the city of Lugano in the Swiss canton of Ticino. The line links a lower station in the Lugano suburb of Paradiso with an upper station at the summit of the Monte San Salvatore. The top yields a 360° panorama with views of the city, Lake Lugano, Monte Generoso and the Italian enclave of Campione.

The line was built in 1890, and originally used an Abt rack rail for braking. It was rebuilt in 1926, when the two-axle cars were replaced by four-axle cars capable of carrying 70 passengers each, and the Abt rail removed. The cars were again replaced in 1957. In 2001, the line was extensively modernised, with new engine, gearbox, brakes and control system, and the 1957-built cars were given a new modern style body.

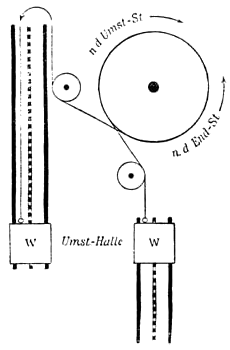
Scheme ca. 1892: the two sections have a single cable for both. At the intermediary station, passengers switch cars ("W" in the diagram) and the cable continues. The engine is located at the intermediary station.

The line has an unusual configuration of two separate single-track sections, with passengers transferring between cars at an intermediate station in Pazzallo. Each section has a single car, but there is only one engine and machine room which is located at Pazzallo, and the two cars counterbalance each other. The two cars are similar in design, but are not identical, being adapted to the different gradients of the two sections.

Just after leaving its lower terminal, the funicular crosses above Lugano-Paradiso railway station on a bridge. This station is some 350 metres (1,150 ft) walk to the south of the lower terminal. Urban bus routes 1 and 2 of the Trasporti Pubblici Luganesi (TPL) serve a stop some 150 metres (490 ft) to the north of the terminal at Paradiso Gerreta.

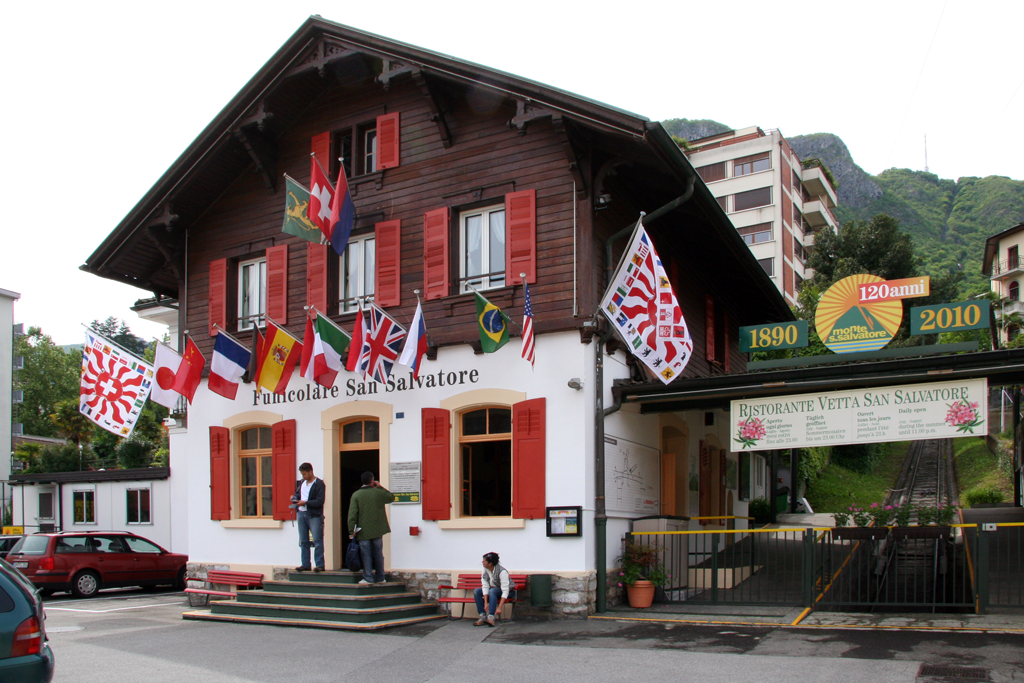
Lower station at Paradiso (2010)

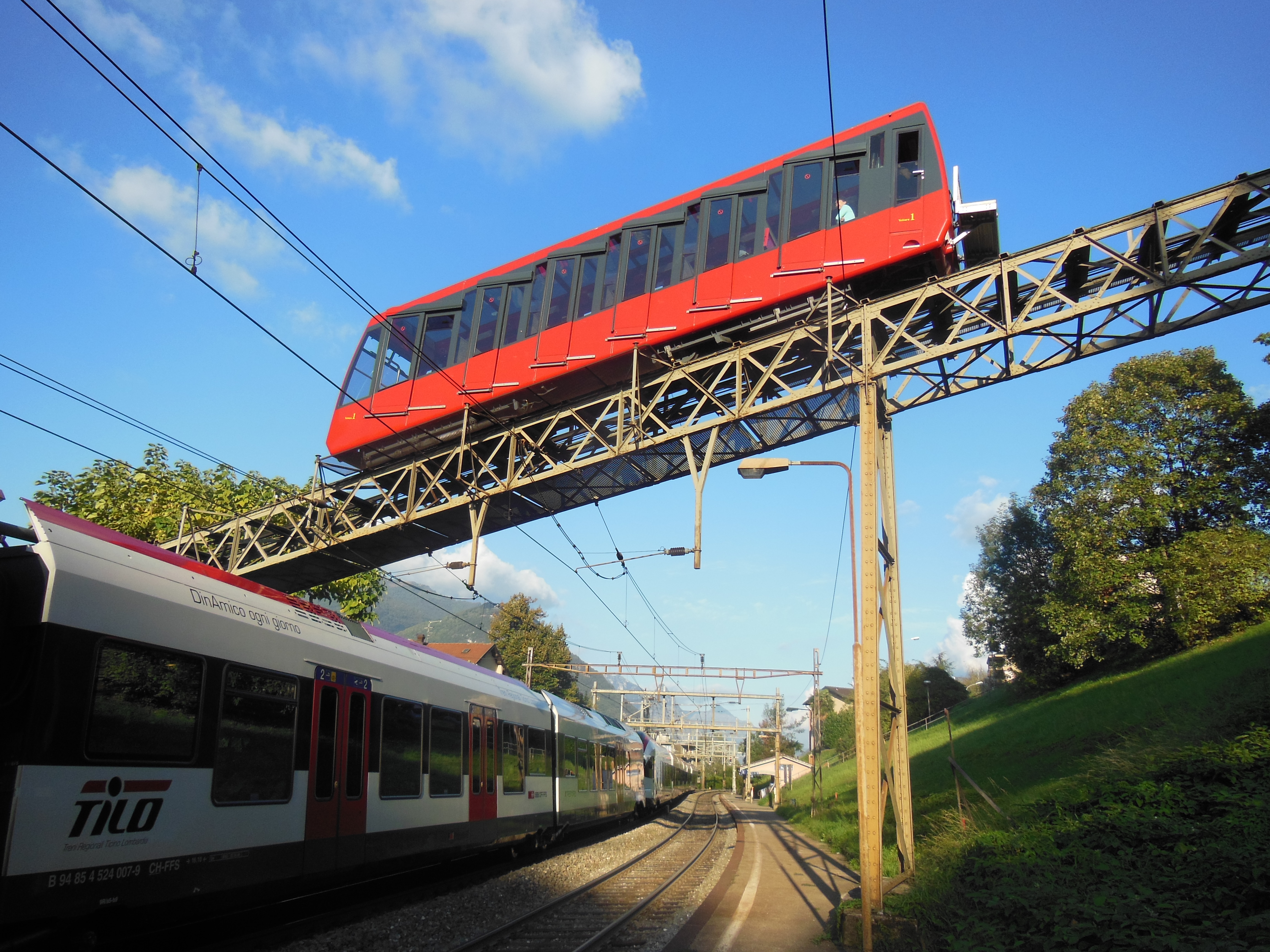
Lower section car passing over Paradiso railway station (2012)

The funicular is owned and operated by Funicolare Lugano-Paradiso-Monte San Salvatore SA.

The Monte San Salvatore funicular is one of three operational funiculars within the Lugano area. The other two are the Monte Brè funicular, which ascends Monte Brè on the opposite side of the city, and the Lugano Città–Stazione funicular, which links the city centre with the railway station.

== Operation ==
The line runs every 30 minutes, with a total journey time of approximately 12 minutes. It has the following parameters:

	Lower section	Upper section
Number of cars	1	1
Number of stops	2	2
Configuration	Single track	Single track
Mode of operation	Manual	Manual
Track length	815 metres (2,674 ft)	815 metres (2,674 ft)
Rise	248 metres (814 ft)	353 metres (1,158 ft)
Maximum gradient	37%	61%
Track gauge	1,000 mm (3 ft 3 3/8 in) metre gauge	1,000 mm (3 ft 3 3/8 in) metre gauge
Capacity	60 passengers per car	60 passengers per car
Maximum speed	3 metres per second (9.8 ft/s)	3 metres per second (9.8 ft/s)

== See also ==
- List of funicular railways
- List of funiculars in Switzerland

== Gallery ==
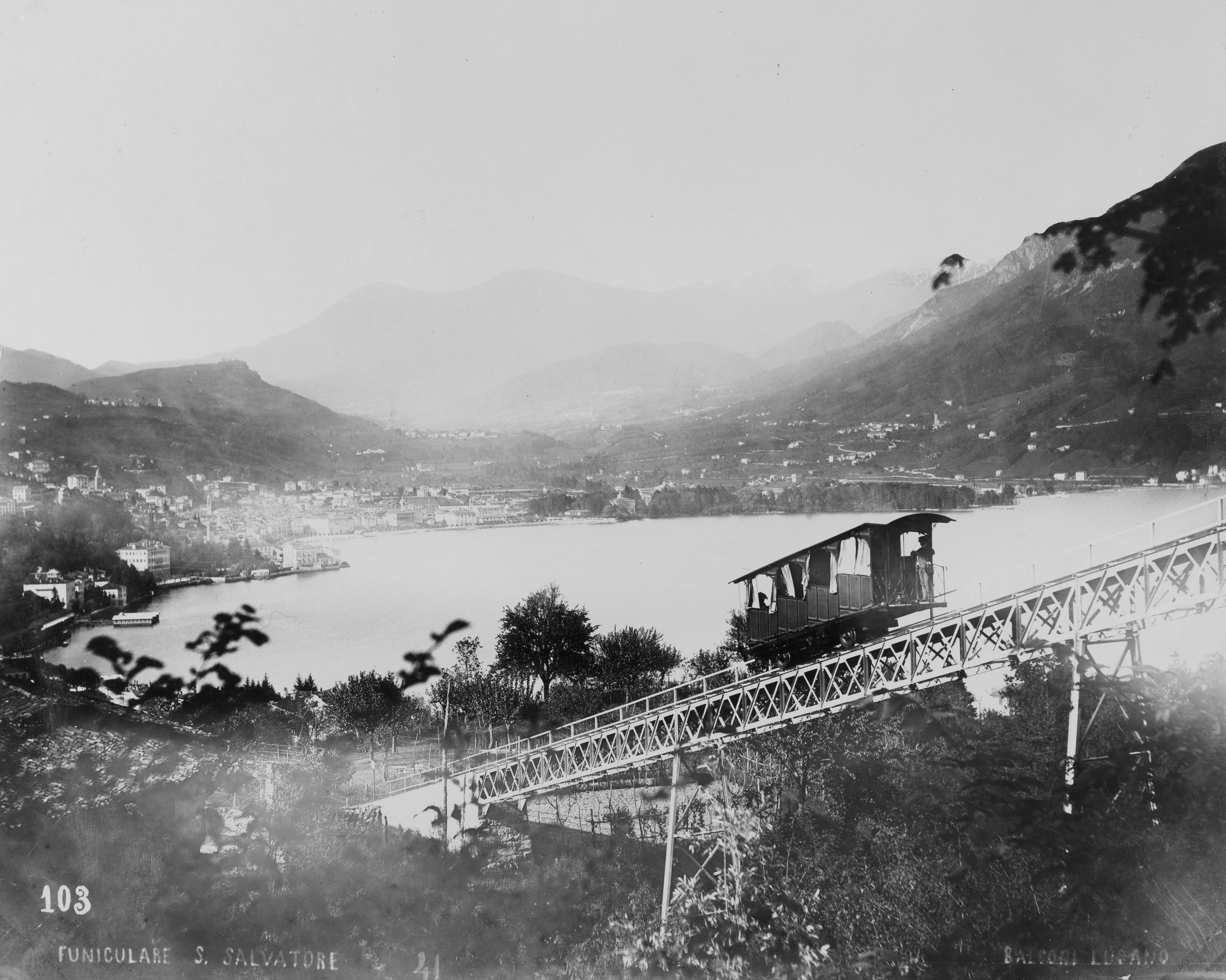
Lake Lugano and the funicular (ca. 1880)

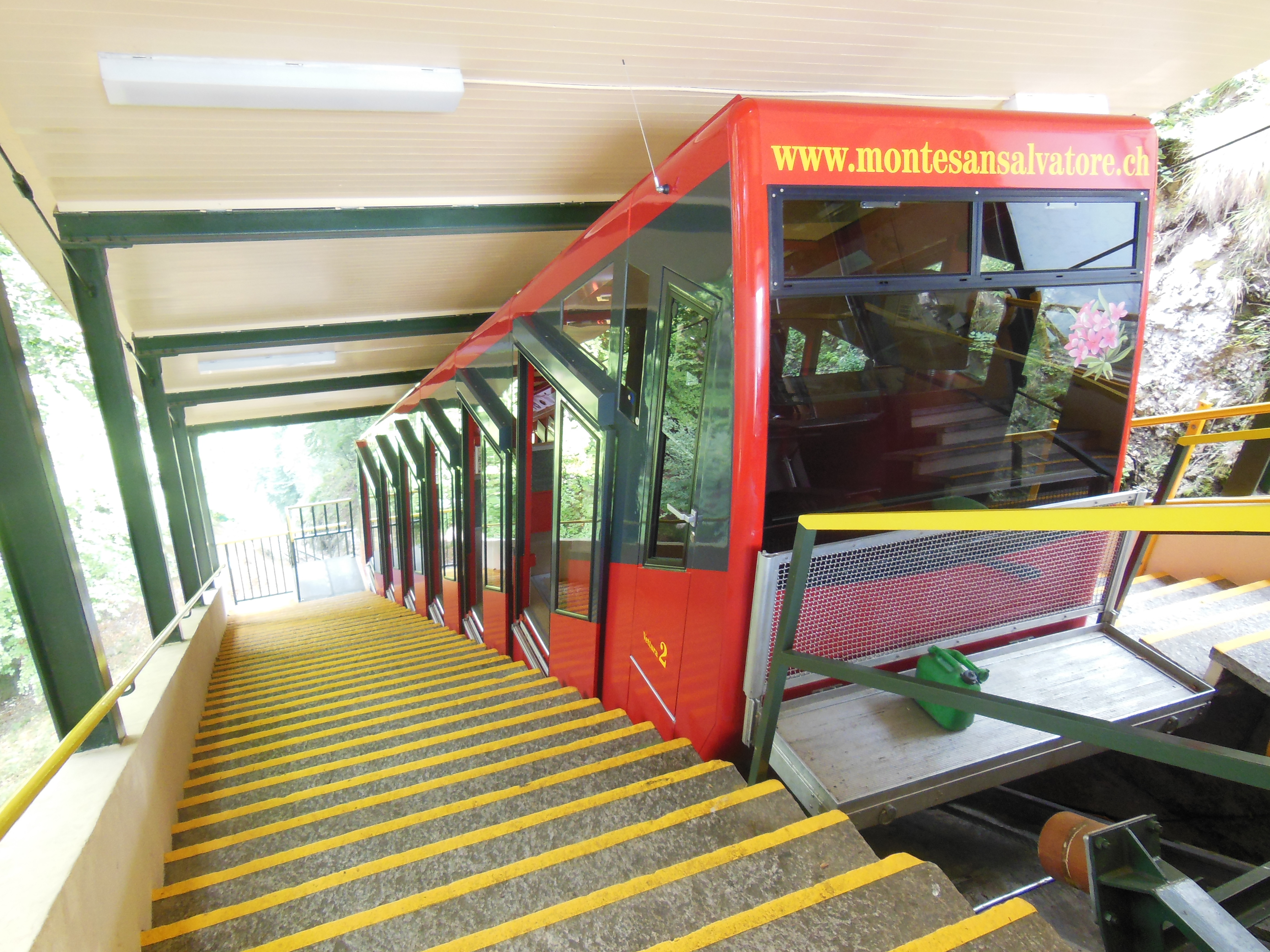
Upper section car in upper station (2012)

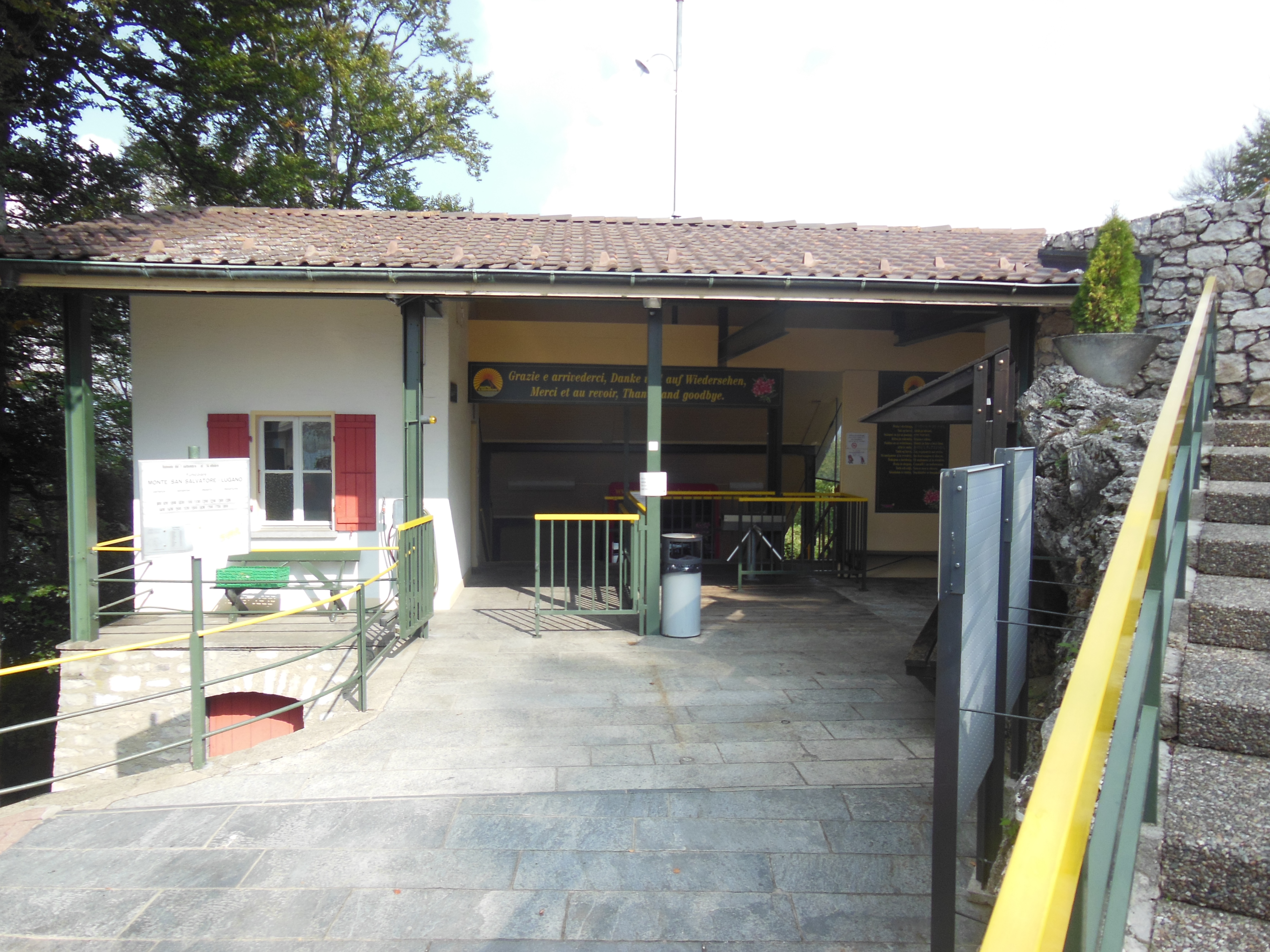
Upper station near summit of Monte San Salvatore (2012)

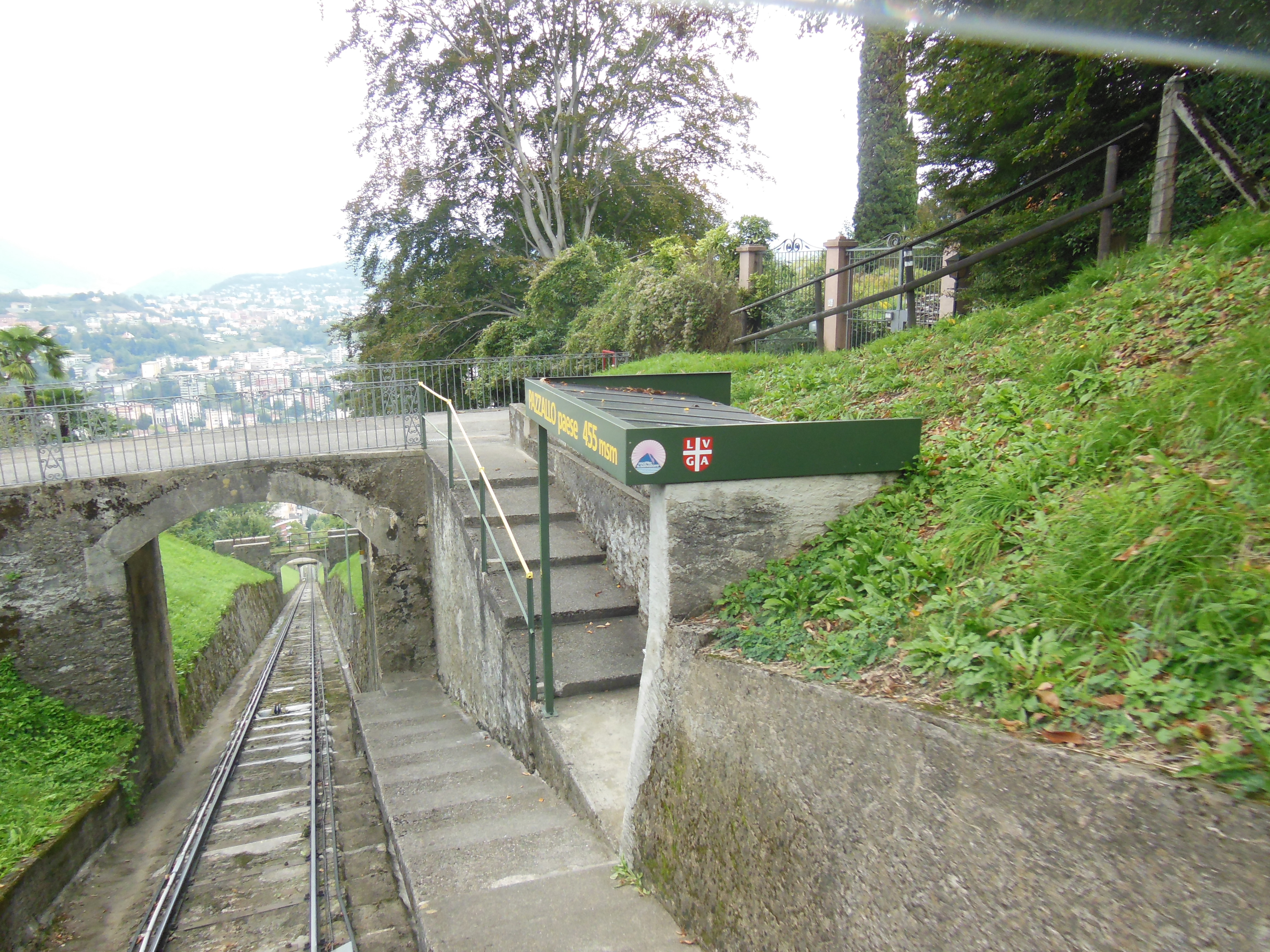
Intermediate stop Pazzallo paese at 455 m above sea level
