= Maroggia-Melano railway station =

Railway station in Switzerland

Maroggia-Melano
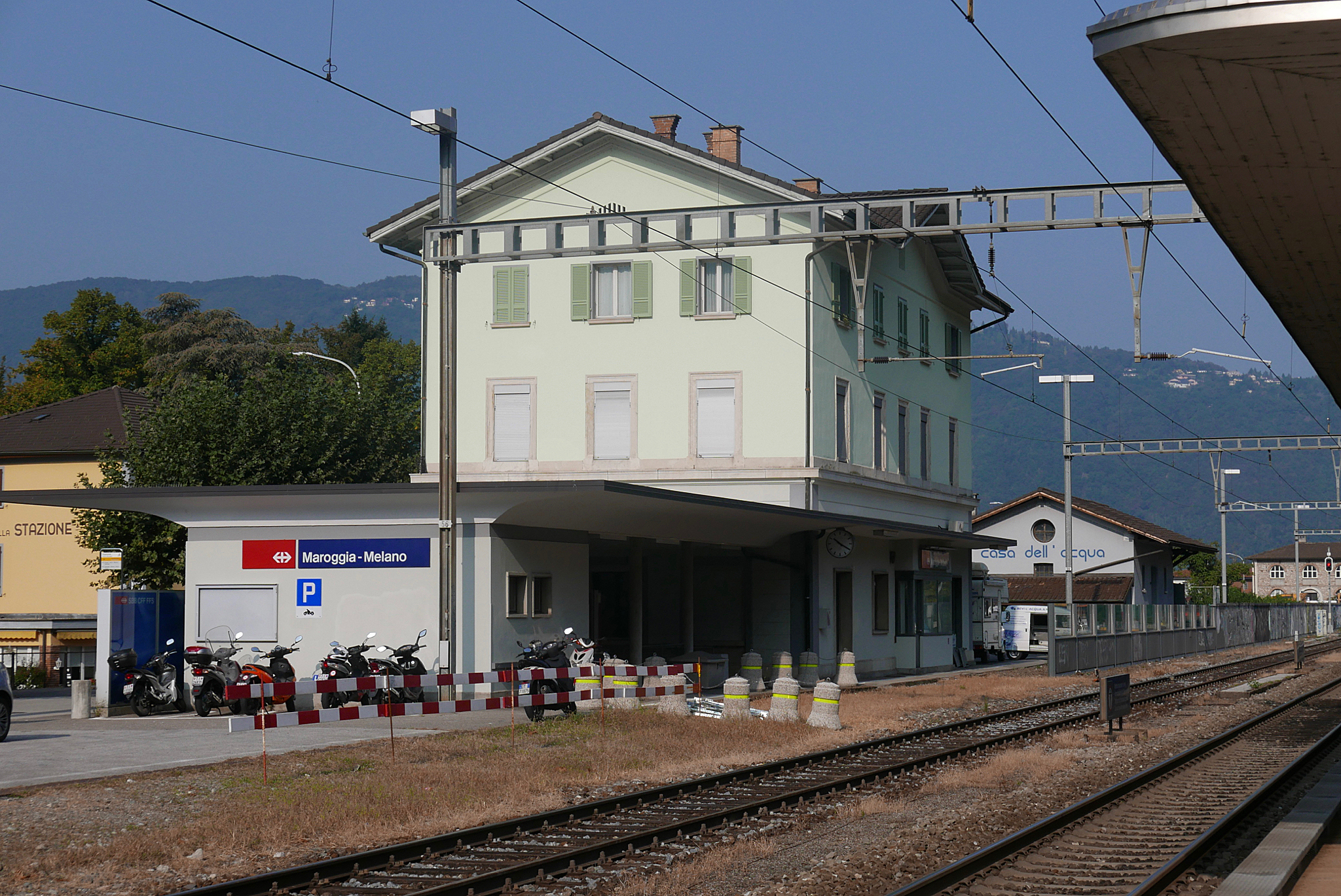
- The station in 2016

General information
- Location: Via Cantonale; Maroggia; Switzerland
- Coordinates: 45°55′57″N 8°58′26″E
- Elevation: 279 m (915 ft)
- Owner: Swiss Federal Railways
- Line: Gotthard line
- Distance: 191.0 km (118.7 mi) from Immensee
- Train operators: Treni Regionali Ticino Lombardia
- Connections: Autopostale

Services
Preceding station	TiLo	Following station
Melide towards Airolo	S10	Capolago-Riva San Vitale towards Como San Giovanni
Melide towards Airolo	S50	Capolago-Riva San Vitale towards Malpensa Aeroporto Terminal 2
Melide towards Giubiasco	S90	Capolago-Riva San Vitale towards Mendrisio
Location

Maroggia-Melano railway station (Italian: Stazione di Maroggia-Melano) is a railway station in the Swiss canton of Ticino. The station is located on the border between the municipalities of Maroggia and Melano, and serves both. The station is on the Swiss Federal Railways Gotthard railway, between Lugano and Chiasso.

== Services ==
As of the December 2021 timetable change, the following services stop at Maroggia-Melano:

- S10 / S50: half-hourly service between Biasca and Mendrisio and hourly service to Chiasso, Como San Giovanni, or Malpensa Aeroporto Terminal 2.
- S90: hourly service between Giubiasco and Mendrisio.
