= Melide railway station =

Railway station in Switzerland

Melide
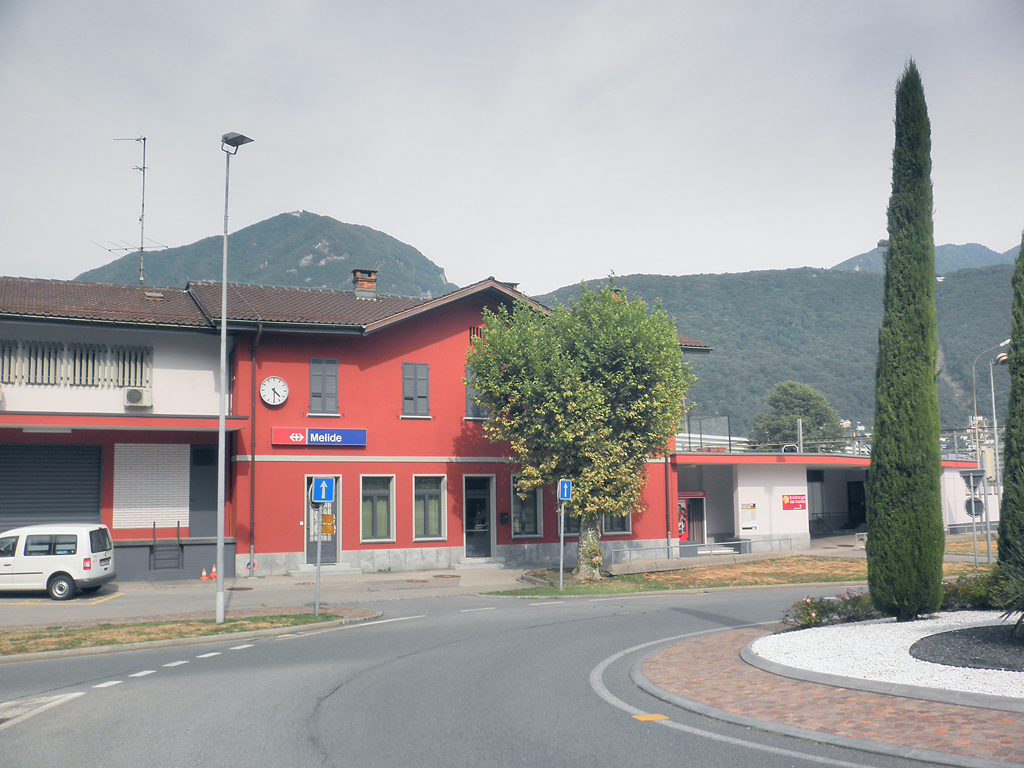
- The station building from the street in 2011

General information
- Location: Via Cantonale; Melide; Switzerland
- Coordinates: 45°57′21″N 8°56′54″E
- Elevation: 274 m (899 ft)
- Owner: Swiss Federal Railways
- Line: Gotthard line
- Distance: 187.2 km (116.3 mi) from Immensee
- Train operators: Treni Regionali Ticino Lombardia
- Connections: Autopostale; Società Navigazione del Lago di Lugano

Construction
- Accessible: yes

Services
Preceding station	TiLo	Following station
Lugano Paradiso towards Airolo	S10	Maroggia-Melano towards Como San Giovanni
Lugano Paradiso towards Airolo	S50	Maroggia-Melano towards Malpensa Aeroporto Terminal 2
Lugano Paradiso towards Giubiasco	S90	Maroggia-Melano towards Mendrisio
Location

Melide railway station (Italian: Stazione di Melide) is a railway station in the Swiss canton of Ticino and the municipality of Melide. The station is on the Swiss Federal Railways Gotthard railway, between Lugano and Chiasso. It is situated immediately to the west of the Melide causeway, which carries the railway, along with several roads, across Lake Lugano.

== Services ==
As of the December 2021 timetable change, the following services stop at Melide:

- S10 / S50: half-hourly service between Biasca and Mendrisio and hourly service to Chiasso, Como San Giovanni, or Malpensa Aeroporto Terminal 2.
- S90: hourly service between Giubiasco and Mendrisio.

== Gallery ==
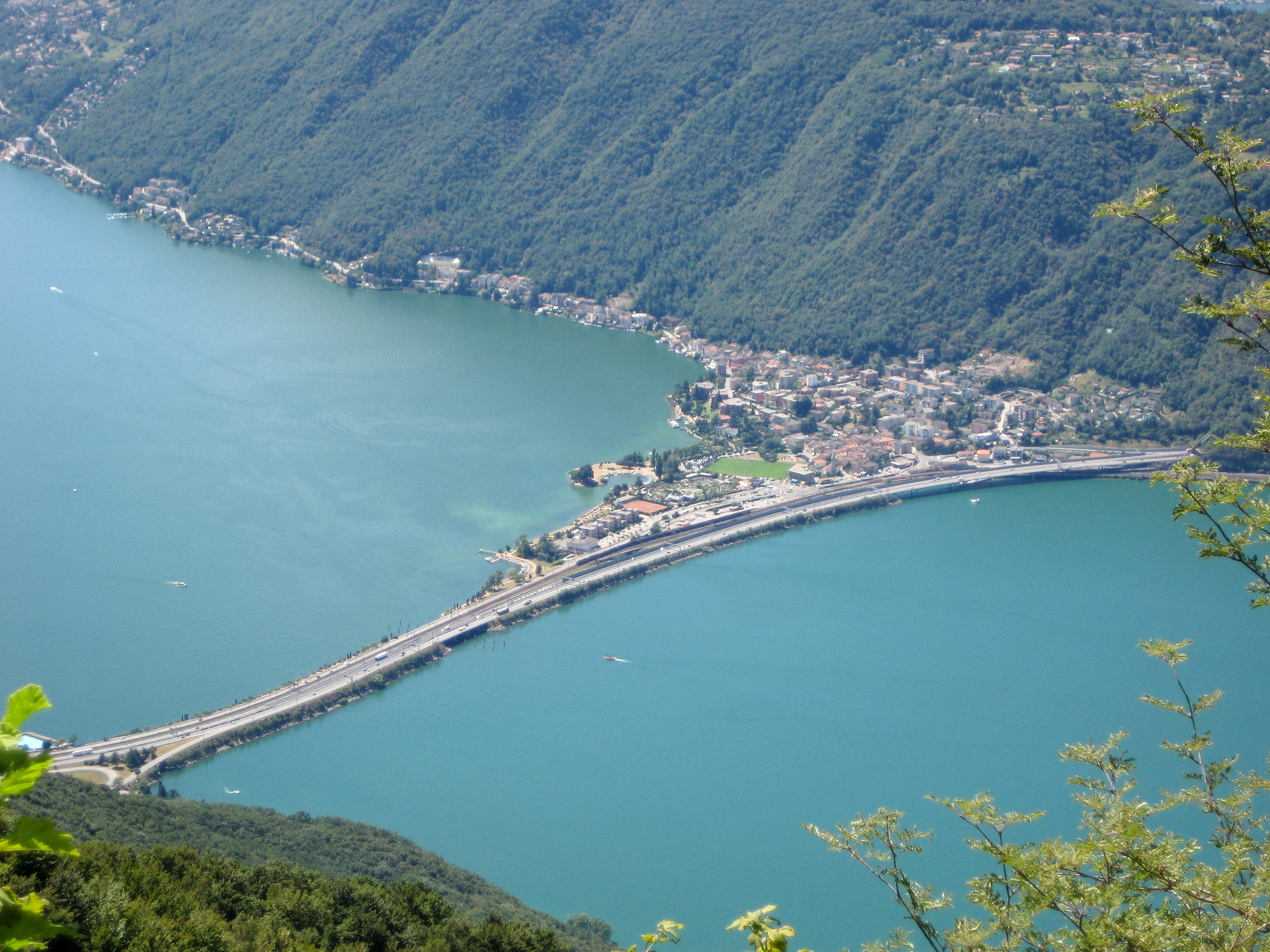
The Melide causeway, with station mid-upper right

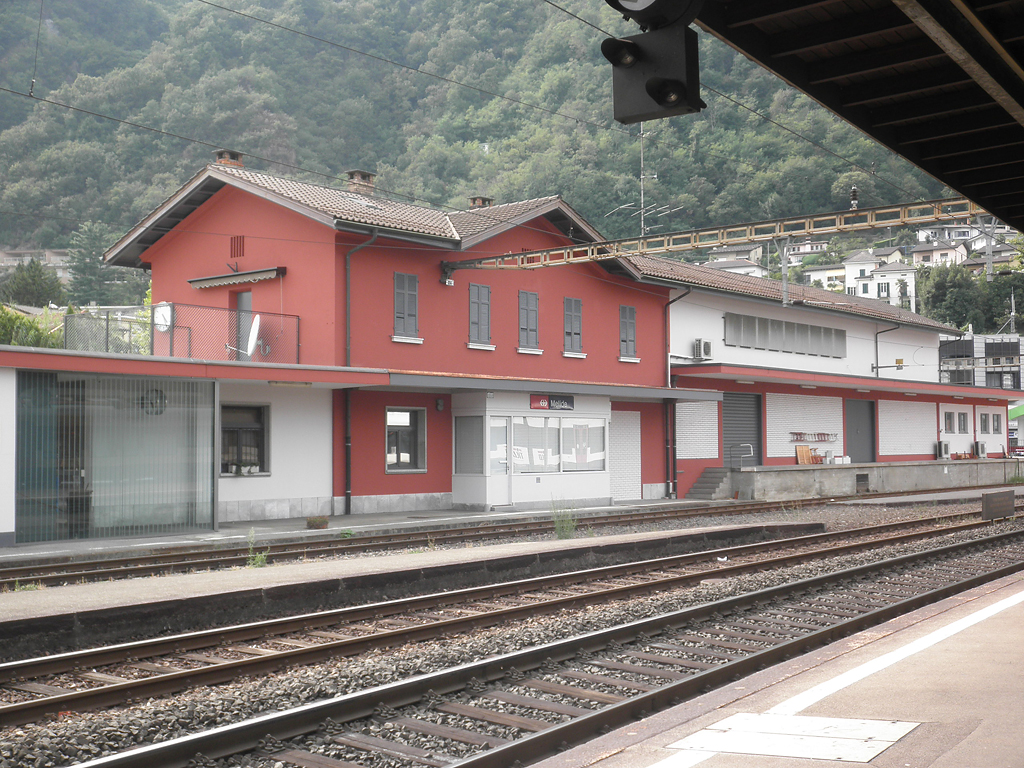
Melide station platform and building
