= Pazzallo =

Coordinates: 45°59′3″N 8°56′36″E

- Quarter
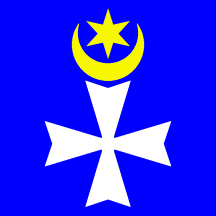
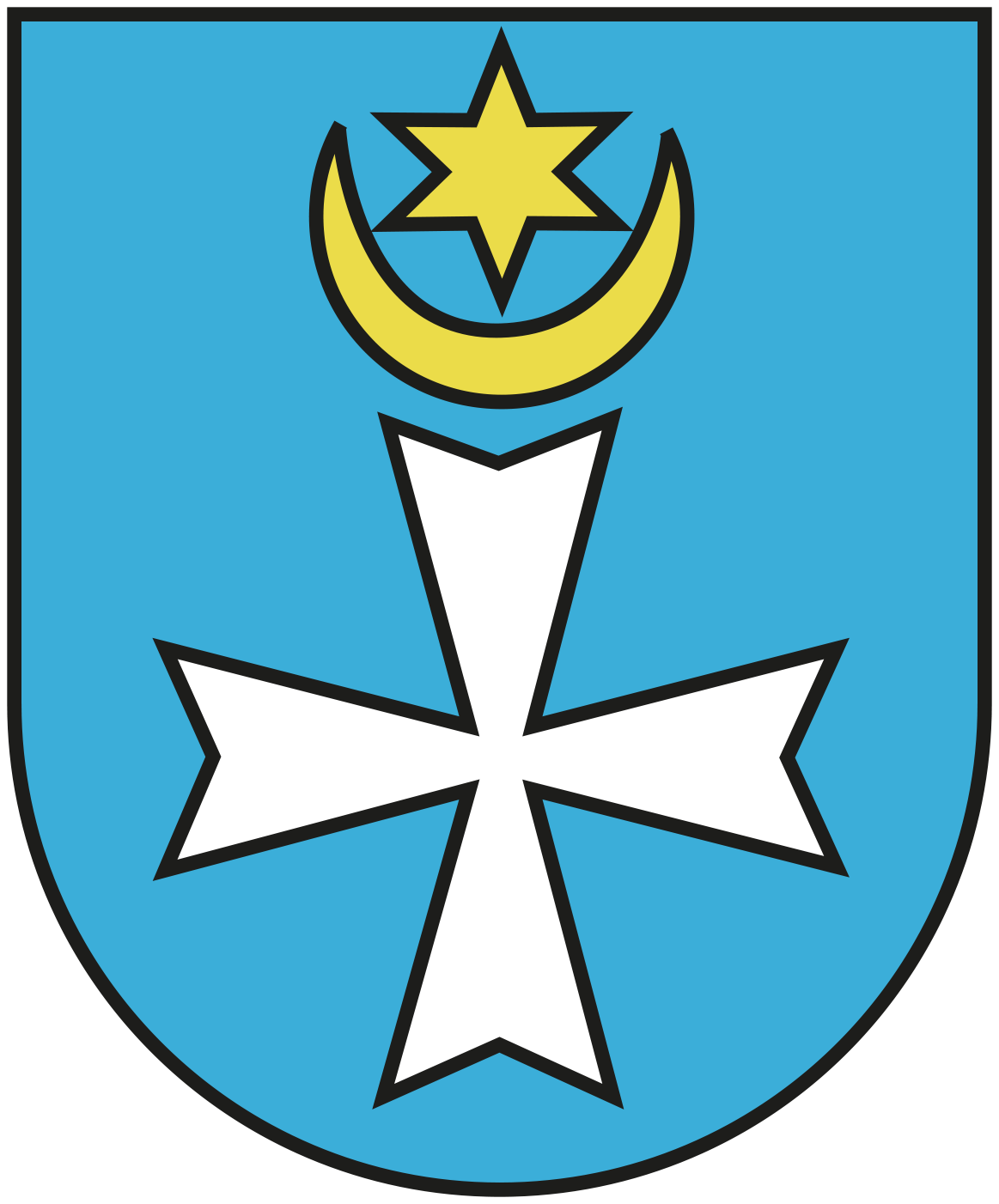
- Flag Coat of arms

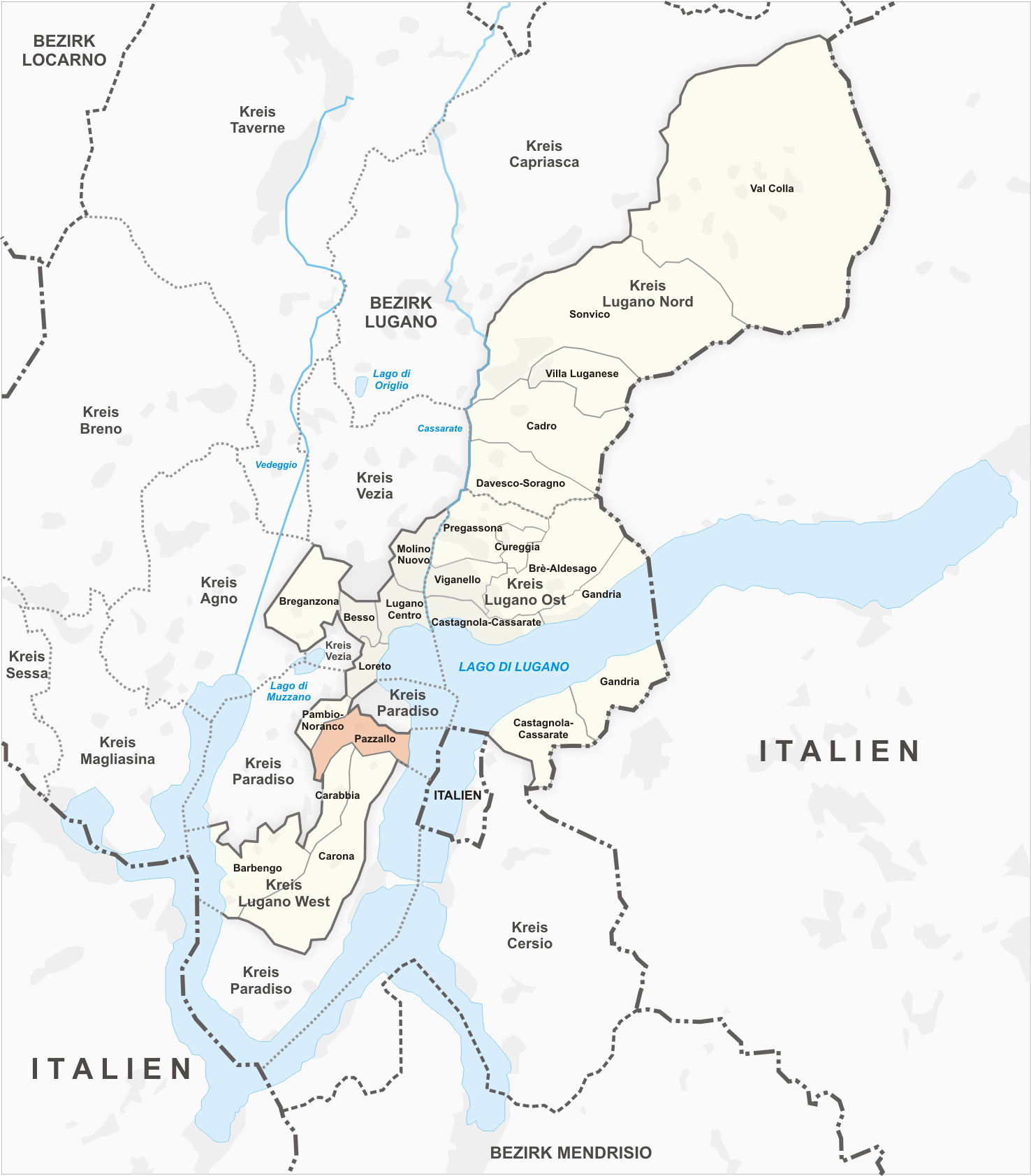
- Country: Switzerland
- Canton: Ticino
- District: Lugano
- City: Lugano

Area
  - Total: 1.63 km^{2} (0.63 sq mi)

Population (2012-12-31)
  - Total: 1,648
  - Density: 1,010/km^{2} (2,620/sq mi)

Pazzallo is a quarter of the city of Lugano in the Swiss canton of Ticino. Pazzallo was formerly a municipality of its own, having been incorporated into Lugano in 2004.

Pazzallo lies on the slopes of Monte San Salvatore, uphill of the independent municipality of Paradiso that forms an exclave within the city of Lugano. Whilst the original nucleus lies on the higher slopes, the lower western slopes, towards the Lugano-Sud junction on the A2 motorway, are now more populous. To the south-east of Paradiso, Pazzallo has a shore on Lake Lugano.
