= Lugano-Paradiso railway station =

Railway station in Switzerland

Paradiso
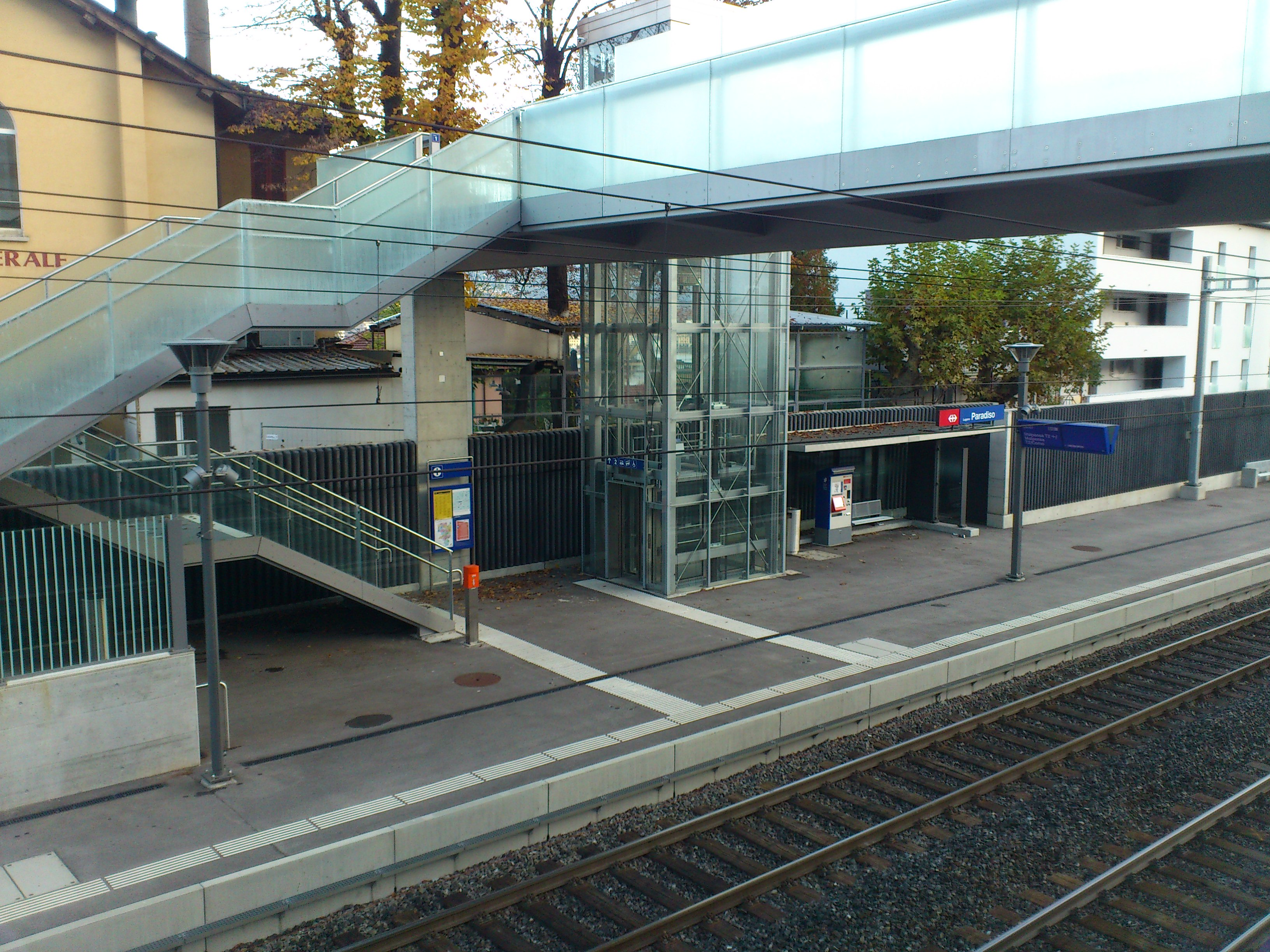
- The north side (Chiasso bound) of the station in 2019

General information
- Location: Paradiso; Switzerland
- Coordinates: 45°59′20″N 8°56′47″E
- Elevation: 302 m (991 ft)
- Owner: Swiss Federal Railways
- Line: Gotthard line
- Distance: 182.8 km (113.6 mi) from Immensee
- Train operators: Treni Regionali Ticino Lombardia
- Connections: Autopostale; Monte San Salvatore funicular; Trasporti Pubblici Luganesi

Other information
- Fare zone: 100 (arcobaleno)

History
- Opened: 1945

Passengers
- 2018: 980 per weekday

Services
Preceding station	TiLo	Following station
Lugano towards Locarno	RE80	Mendrisio towards Milano Centrale
Lugano towards Airolo	S10	Melide towards Como San Giovanni
Lugano towards Airolo	S50	Melide towards Malpensa Aeroporto Terminal 2
Lugano towards Giubiasco	S90	Melide towards Mendrisio
Location

Paradiso railway station (Italian: Stazione di Paradiso) is a railway station in the municipality of Paradiso in the Swiss canton of Ticino (named Lugano-Paradiso until December 2022). The station is on the Gotthard railway of the Swiss Federal Railways, between Lugano and Chiasso. The station opened in 1945 and was renovated in 2018.

== Services ==
As of the December 2021 timetable change, the following services stop at Lugano-Paradiso:

- RE80: half-hourly service between Locarno and Chiasso and hourly service to Milano Centrale.
- S10 / S50: half-hourly service between Biasca and Mendrisio and hourly service to Chiasso, Como San Giovanni, or Malpensa Aeroporto Terminal 2.
- S90: hourly service between Giubiasco and Mendrisio.

The Monte San Salvatore funicular crosses above Paradiso railway station on a bridge. Its lower terminal is some 350 metres (1,150 ft) walk to the north of the station.

Urban bus route 1 of the Trasporti Pubblici Luganesi (TPL) serves a stop on the south side of the station, as do regional buses of the AutoPostale to Agnuzzo, Bissone, Carabietta and Morcote. TPL urban routes 1 and 2 also serve the Paradiso Gerreta stop some 500 metres (1,600 ft) to the north of the station at Paradiso Gerreta.

== Gallery ==
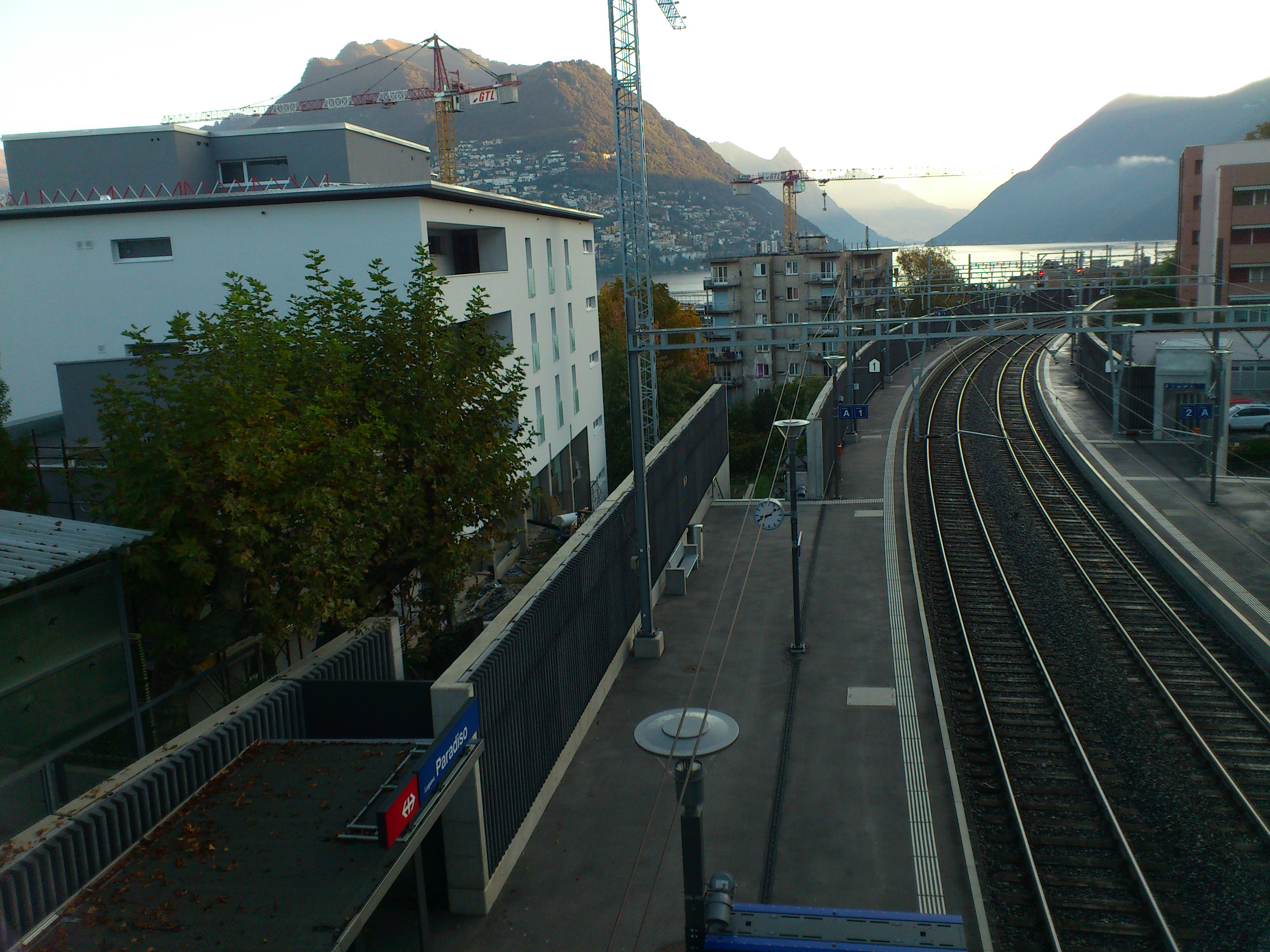
The south side

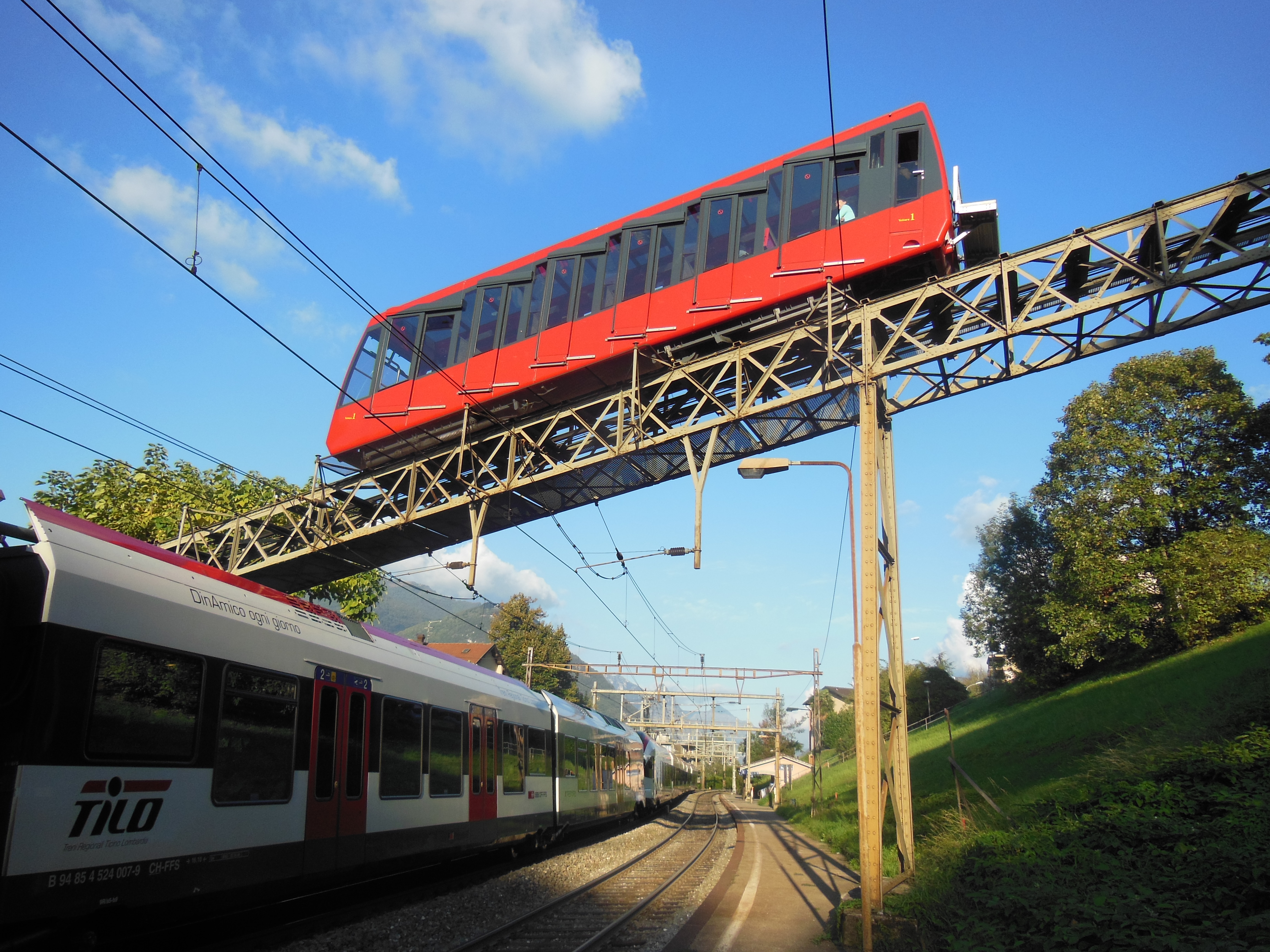
A TiLo FLIRT train in the station, and a car of the funicular passing overhead.
