= Paradiso, Ticino =

Paradiso
- Municipality
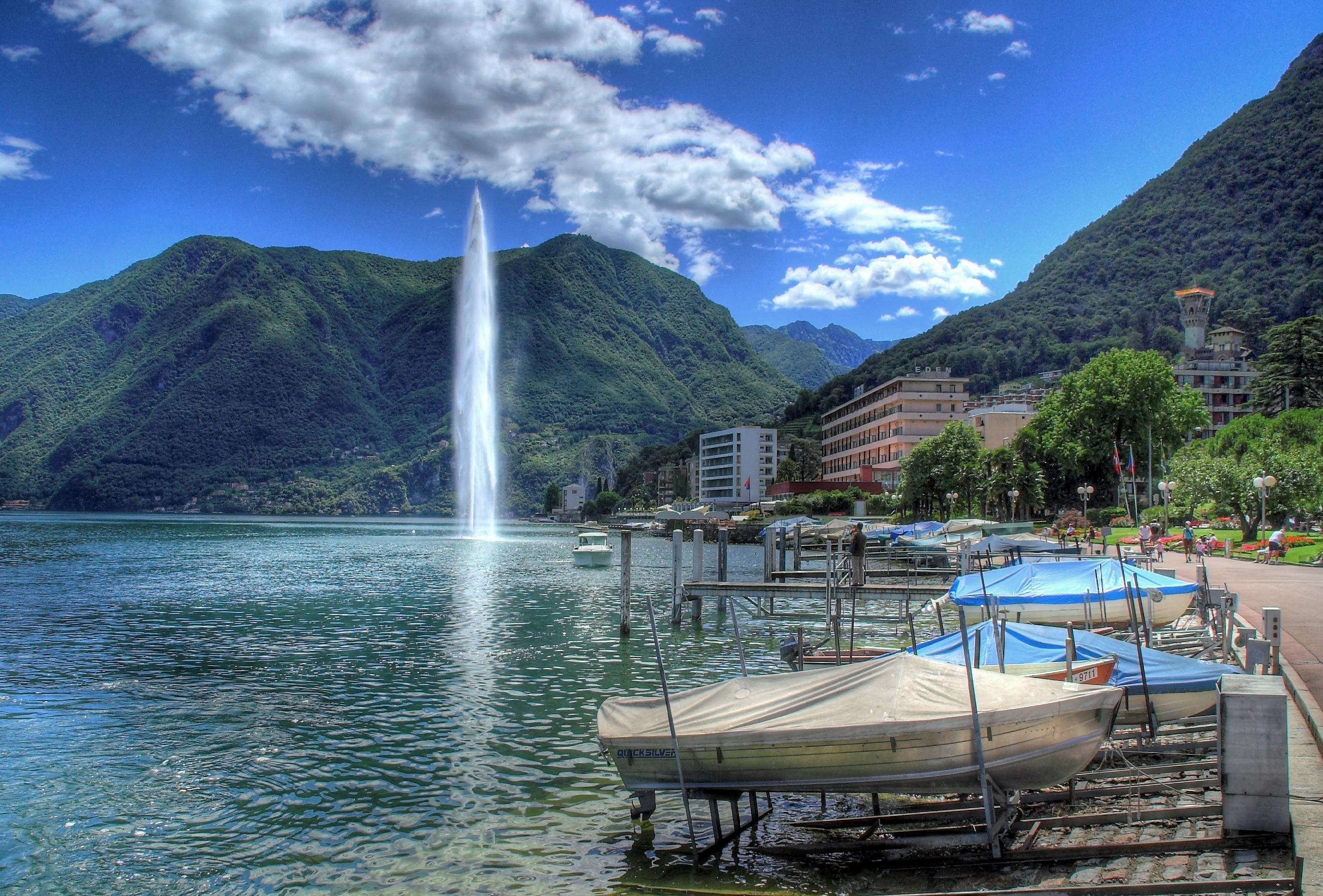

- Flag Coat of arms
- Location of Paradiso
- Location within Switzerland Location within Canton of Ticino
- Coordinates: 45°59′N 8°57′E
- Country: Switzerland
- Canton: Ticino
- District: Lugano

Government
  - Mayor: Sindaco

Area
  - Total: 0.89 km^{2} (0.34 sq mi)
- Elevation: 274 m (899 ft)

Population (December 2006)
  - Total: 4,203
  - Density: 4,700/km^{2} (12,000/sq mi)
- Time zone: UTC+01:00 (CET)
  - Summer (DST): UTC+02:00 (CEST)
- Postal code: 6900
- SFOS number: 5210
- ISO 3166 code: CH-TI
- Surrounded by: Lugano, Lake Lugano
- Website: www.paradiso.ch

Paradiso is a municipality in the district of Lugano in the canton of Ticino in Switzerland. It lies on the shore of Lake Lugano and, although administratively independent of the city of Lugano, it is surrounded on all other sides by that city.

== History ==
Paradiso is first mentioned in 1335 as Calprino. In 1835 it was first called Paradiso from a district of the village, though that didn't become the official name until 1929, also to avoid confusion with the hamlet of Caprino, across the lake.

Excavations in 1951 in Calprino discovered evidence of a Roman era settlement in the area. In the 7th century, there was a small Langobard settlement in the same area. The settlement of Morchino goes back to the 8th century, while Calprino, Fontana and Guidino are each mentioned between the 12th and 14th centuries. In 1040 the Benedictine monastery S. Carpoforo owned land in Calprino. Between 1264 and 1375, they owned extensive lands and an episcopal fief in the village. In the 12th century, the Benedictine Abbey S. Ambrogio in Milan owned land in Guidino. By about 1335, the settlements that now make up Paradiso, formed part of the Council of sancti Petri di Pamio. The Council existed until the 19th century and administered the community properties.

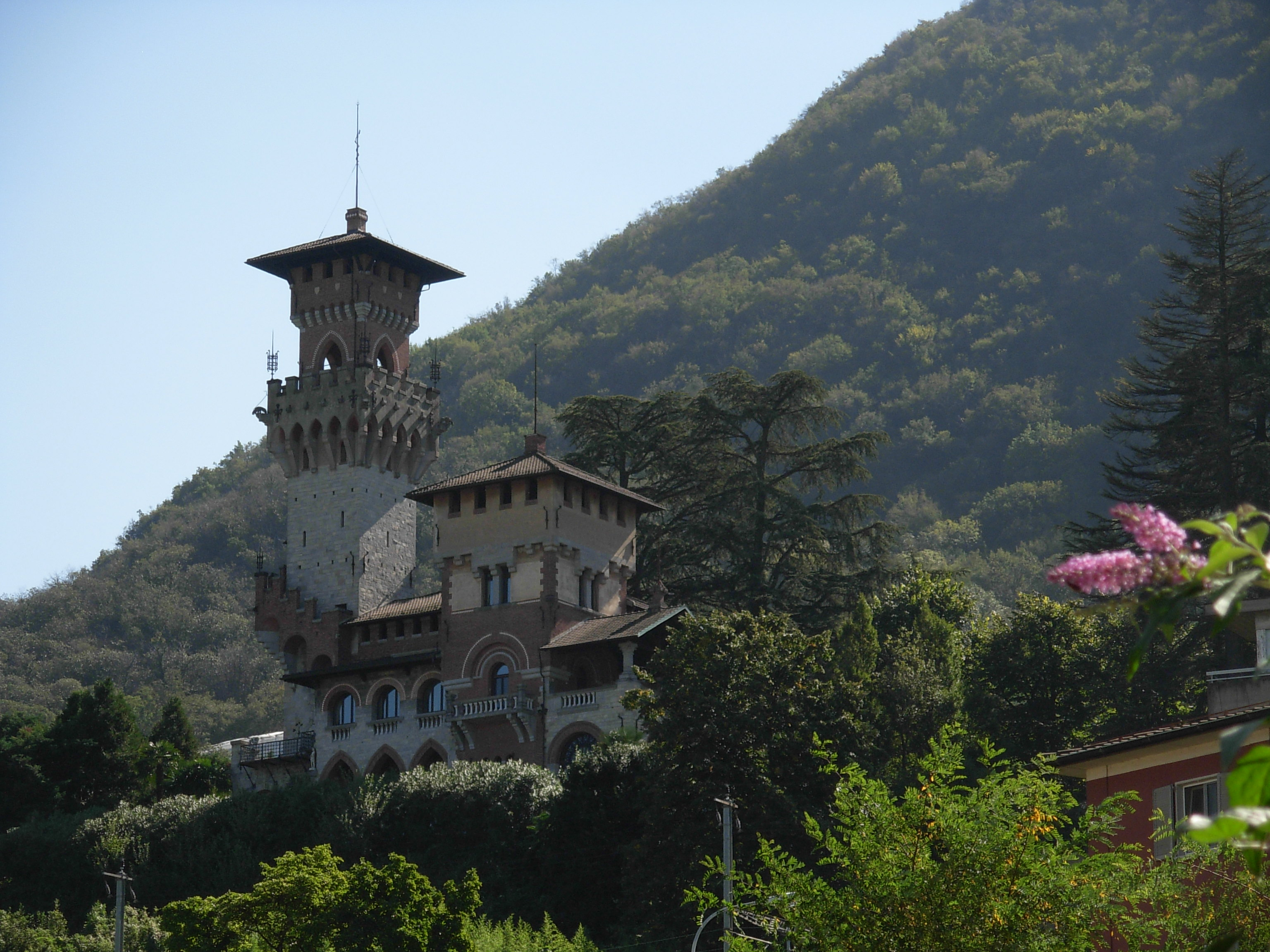
Castello Cattaneo

The church of Paradiso was the parish of Pambio. The Chapel of Beata Vergine alla Geretta has been occupied since the 16th century.

The village economy was based on agriculture, mostly grain and vineyards. Then, in the 18th and 19th century, the silk industry entered the village. Thanks to the views over Lake Lugano, Paradiso became a popular holiday resort after the opening of the Gotthard Railway in 1882. The funicular railway up Monte San Salvatore opened in 1890. The funicular and increasing lake traffic contributed to the further development of the hotel and tourism industry in Paradiso. At the same time, the population grew. The construction of the highway along the municipal border with Lugano in 1966 began to change the character of the municipality. At the beginning of the 21st century, tourism began to decline and Paradiso began to develop into a residential community with many luxury buildings.

== Geography ==
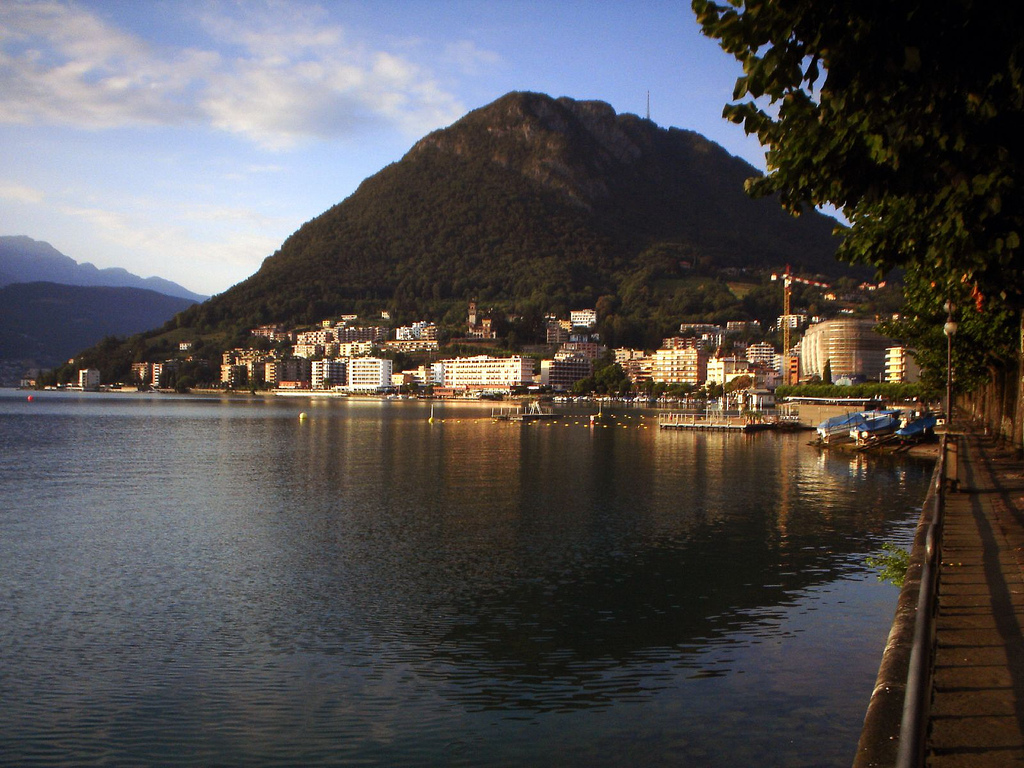
Paradiso waterfront

Aerial view from 400 metres (1,300 ft) by Walter Mittelholzer (1919)

Paradiso is located at the foot, and up the lower slopes, of Monte San Salvatore, on the shores Lake Lugano. The municipality consists of the village of Paradiso, which is made up of the sections of Calprino, Guidino, Fontana and Morchino.

Paradiso has an area, as of 1997, of 0.89 square kilometers (0.34 sq mi). Of this area, 0.33 km^{2} (0.13 sq mi) or 37.1% is used for agricultural purposes, while 0.32 km^{2} (0.12 sq mi) or 36.0% is forested. Of the rest of the land, 0.52 km^{2} (0.20 sq mi) or 58.4% is settled (buildings or roads), 0.01 km^{2} (2.5 acres) or 1.1% is either rivers or lakes.

Of the built up area, housing and buildings made up 33.7% and transportation infrastructure made up 20.2%. Power and water infrastructure as well as other special developed areas made up 1.1% of the area while parks, green belts and sports fields made up 3.4%. Out of the forested land, 30.3% of the total land area is heavily forested and 5.6% is covered with orchards or small clusters of trees. Of the agricultural land, 2.2% is used for growing crops, while 1.1% is used for orchards or vine crops and 33.7% is used for alpine pastures. All the water in the municipality is in lakes.

== Coat of arms ==
The blazon of the municipal coat of arms is Vert a lion rampant or and in a base argent three bendlets wavy of the first.

== Demographics ==
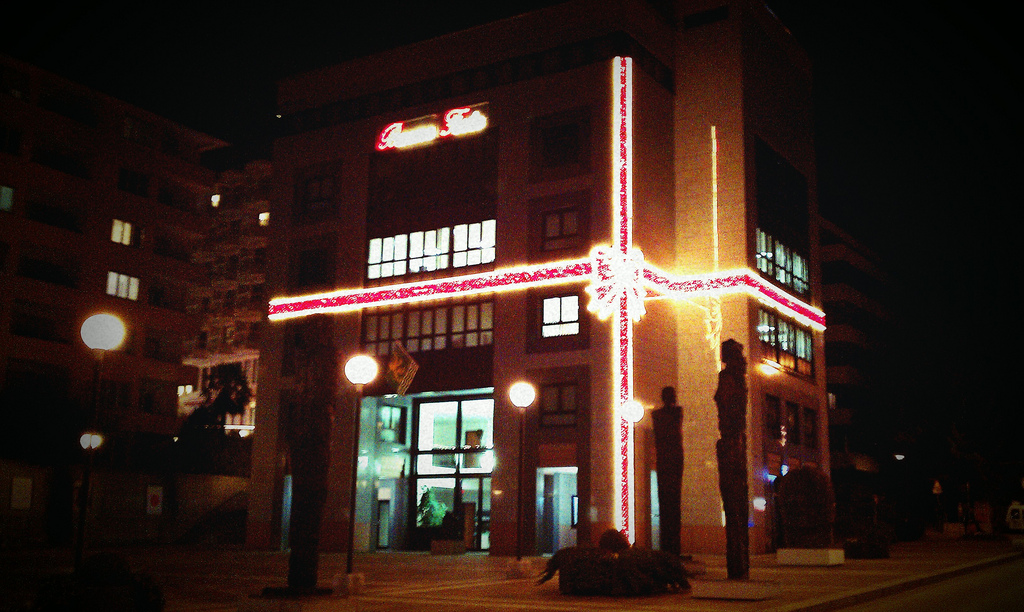
Paradiso town hall with Christmas decorations

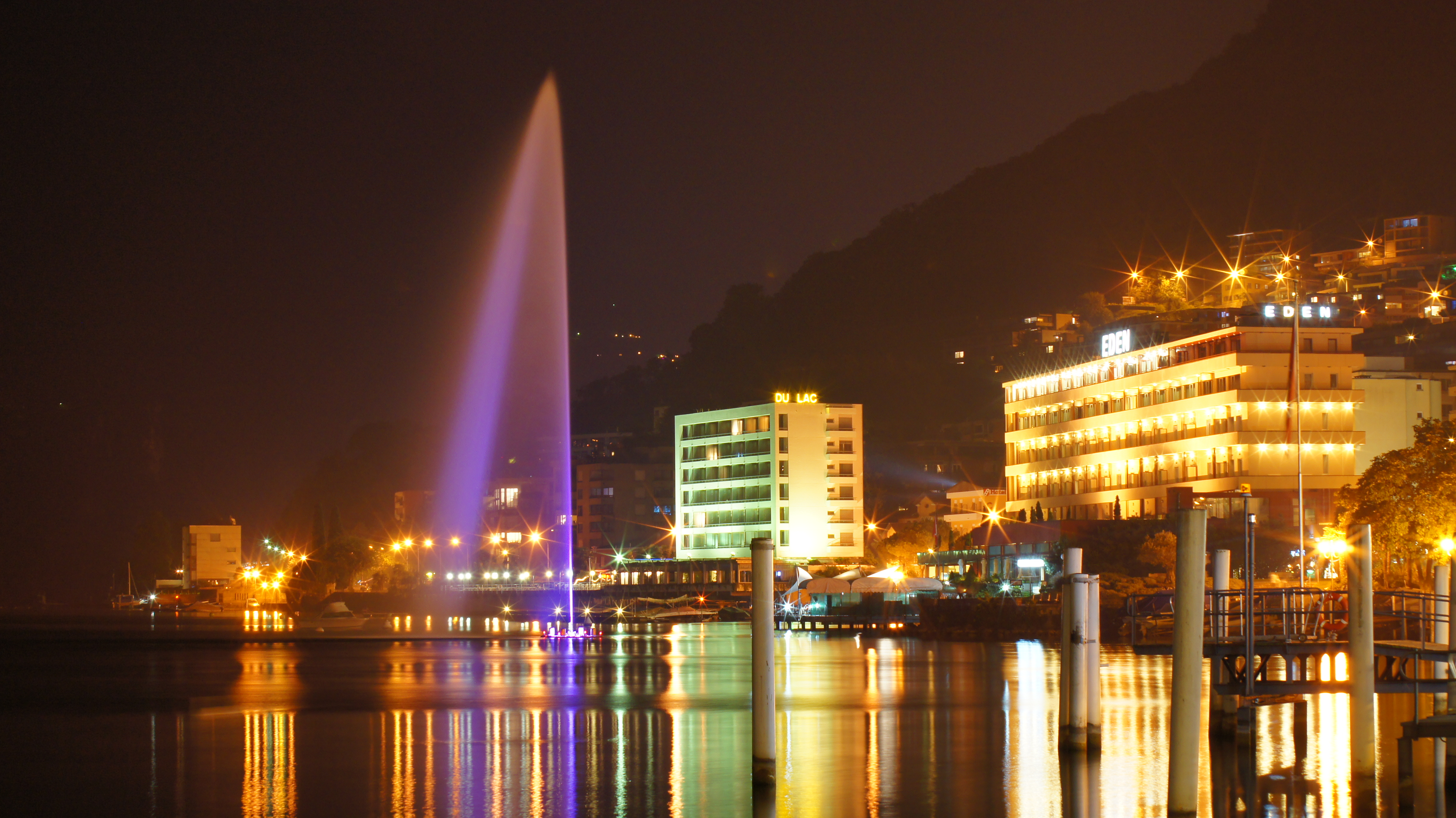
Paradiso with its water fountain

As of 2024, Paradiso has a population of 4,852, based on the 2024 figures published by the Federal Statistical Office, of which 1,866 are Swiss nationals, and 2,987 are foreigners. Italians (1,853) are the largest foreign national group, followed by other EU countries (253).

Most of the population (as of 2000) speaks Italian (66.7%), with German being second most common (10.0%) and Serbo-Croatian being third (6.9%). Of the Swiss national languages (as of 2000), 370 speak German, 99 people speak French, 2,463 people speak Italian, and 3 people speak Romansh. The remainder (759 people) speak another language. The gender distribution of the population was 2310 male and 2214 female.

In 2008 there were 25 live births to Swiss citizens and 19 births to non-Swiss citizens, and in same time span there were 21 deaths of Swiss citizens and 13 non-Swiss citizen deaths. Ignoring immigration and emigration, the population of Swiss citizens increased by 4 while the foreign population increased by 6. There were 3 Swiss men who emigrated from Switzerland and 3 Swiss women who immigrated back to Switzerland. At the same time, there were 100 non-Swiss men and 65 non-Swiss women who immigrated from another country to Switzerland. The total Swiss population change in 2008 (from all sources, including moves across municipal borders) was an increase of 66 and the non-Swiss population change was an increase of 53 people. This represents a population growth rate of 3.4%.

The age distribution, as of 2009, in Paradiso is; 270 children or 7.4% of the population are between 0 and 9 years old and 287 teenagers or 7.8% are between 10 and 19. Of the adult population, 414 people or 11.3% of the population are between 20 and 29 years old. 587 people or 16.0% are between 30 and 39, 598 people or 16.3% are between 40 and 49, and 483 people or 13.2% are between 50 and 59. The senior population distribution is 430 people or 11.8% of the population are between 60 and 69 years old, 365 people or 10.0% are between 70 and 79, there are 224 people or 6.1% who are over 80.

As of 2000 the average number of residents per living room was 0.7 which is more people per room than the cantonal average of 0.6 per room. In this case, a room is defined as space of a housing unit of at least 4 m^{2} (43 sq ft) as normal bedrooms, dining rooms, living rooms, kitchens and habitable cellars and attics. About 15.1% of the total households were owner occupied, or in other words did not pay rent (though they may have a mortgage or a rent-to-own agreement).

As of 2000, there were 1,762 private households in the municipality, and an average of 2. persons per household. In 2000 there were 45 single family homes (or 16.9% of the total) out of a total of 267 inhabited buildings. There were 16 two family buildings (6.0%) and 121 multi-family buildings (45.3%). There were also 85 buildings in the municipality that were multipurpose buildings (used for both housing and commercial or another purpose).

The vacancy rate for the municipality, in 2008, was 1.01%. In 2000 there were 2,359 apartments in the municipality. The most common apartment size was the 3 room apartment of which there were 682. There were 442 single room apartments and 157 apartments with five or more rooms. Of these apartments, a total of 1,755 apartments (74.4% of the total) were permanently occupied, while 443 apartments (18.8%) were seasonally occupied and 161 apartments (6.8%) were empty. As of 2007, the construction rate of new housing units was 1.1 new units per 1000 residents.

The historical population is given in the following chart:

== Politics ==
In the 2007 federal election the most popular party was the CVP which received 22.77% of the vote. The next three most popular parties were the FDP (22.44%), the Ticino League (21.38%) and the SP (15.29%). In the federal election, a total of 607 votes were cast, and the voter turnout was 40.3%.

In the 2007 Gran Consiglio election, there were a total of 1,517 registered voters in Paradiso, of which 759 or 50.0% voted. 12 blank ballots and 5 null ballots were cast, leaving 742 valid ballots in the election. The most popular party was the PLRT which received 175 or 23.6% of the vote. The next three most popular parties were; the LEGA (with 150 or 20.2%), the SSI (with 122 or 16.4%) and the PS (with 116 or 15.6%).

In the 2007 Consiglio di Stato election, 6 blank ballots and 4 null ballots were cast, leaving 749 valid ballots in the election. The most popular party was the LEGA which received 186 or 24.8% of the vote. The next three most popular parties were; the PLRT (with 170 or 22.7%), the PS (with 131 or 17.5%) and the SSI (with 121 or 16.2%).

== Economy ==
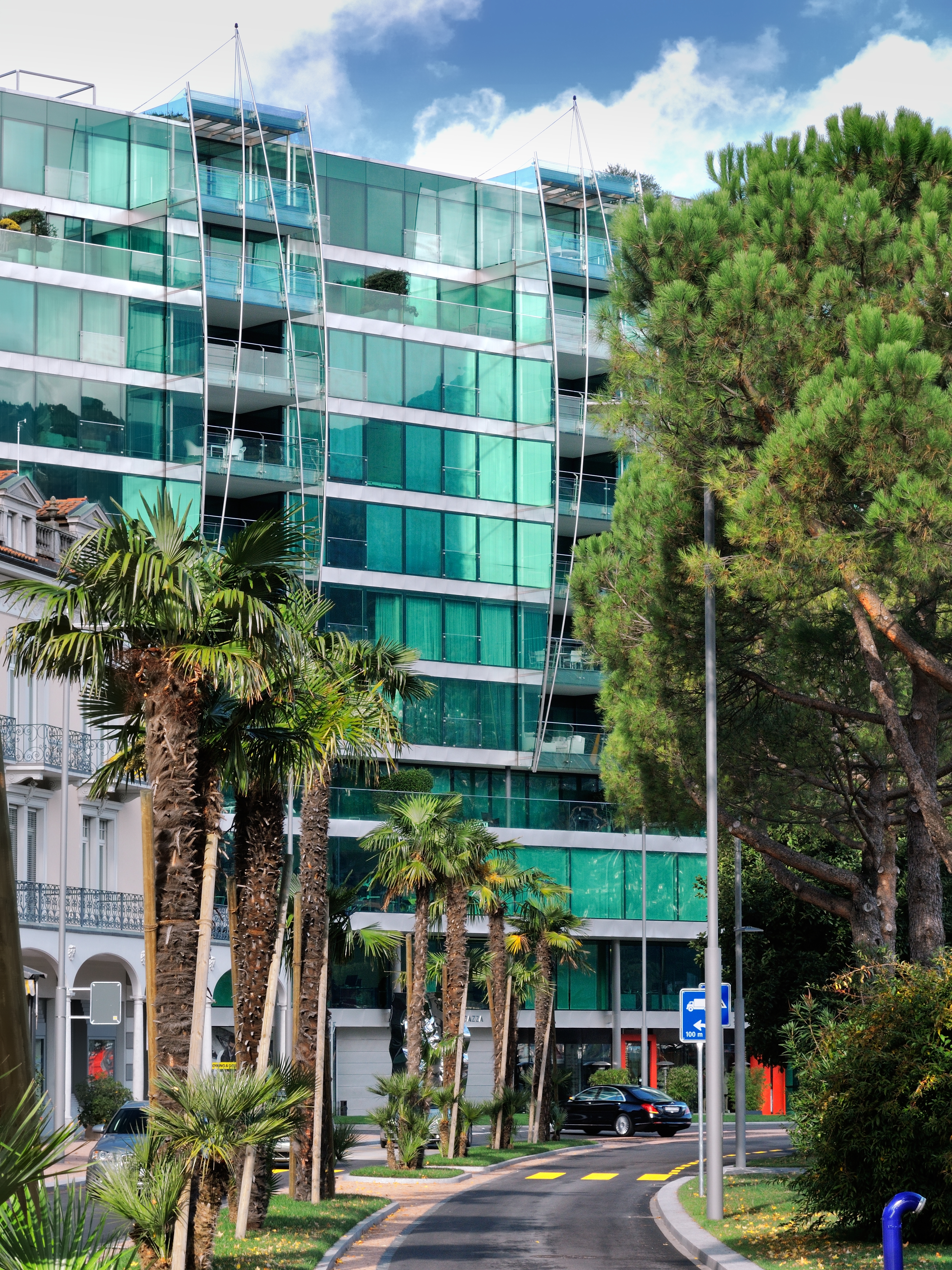
Luxury condominium on Riva Paradiso

As of 2007, Paradiso had an unemployment rate of 5.96%. As of 2005, there were 11 people employed in the primary economic sector and about 3 businesses involved in this sector. 194 people were employed in the secondary sector and there were 33 businesses in this sector. 1,671 people were employed in the tertiary sector, with 234 businesses in this sector. There were 1,790 residents of the municipality who were employed in some capacity, of which females made up 45.0% of the workforce.

In 2000, there were 1,742 workers who commuted into the municipality and 1,277 workers who commuted away. The municipality is a net importer of workers, with about 1.4 workers entering the municipality for every one leaving. About 14.5% of the workforce coming into Paradiso are coming from outside Switzerland, while 0.8% of the locals commute out of Switzerland for work. Of the working population, 19.4% used public transportation to get to work, and 38.6% used a private car.

As of 2009, there were 10 hotels in Paradiso with a total of 621 rooms and 1,160 beds.

== Religion ==
From the 2000 census, 2,270 or 61.5% were Roman Catholic, while 267 or 7.2% belonged to the Swiss Reformed Church. There are 890 individuals (or about 24.09% of the population) who belong to another church (not listed on the census), and 267 individuals (or about 7.23% of the population) did not answer the question.

== Education ==
In Paradiso about 56.7% of the population (between age 25 and 64) have completed either non-mandatory upper secondary education or additional higher education (either university or a Fachhochschule).

In Paradiso there were a total of 370 students (as of 2009). The Ticino education system provides up to three years of non-mandatory kindergarten and in Paradiso there were 69 children in kindergarten. The primary school program lasts for five years and includes both a standard school and a special school. In the municipality, 101 students attended the standard primary schools and 5 students attended the special school. In the lower secondary school system, students either attend a two-year middle school followed by a two-year pre-apprenticeship or they attend a four-year program to prepare for higher education. There were 94 students in the two-year middle school and 1 in their pre-apprenticeship, while 27 students were in the four-year advanced program.

The upper secondary school includes several options, but at the end of the upper secondary program, a student will be prepared to enter a trade or to continue on to a university or college. In Ticino, vocational students may either attend school while working on their internship or apprenticeship (which takes three or four years) or may attend school followed by an internship or apprenticeship (which takes one year as a full-time student or one and a half to two years as a part-time student). There were 26 vocational students who were attending school full-time and 46 who attend part-time.

The professional program lasts three years and prepares a student for a job in engineering, nursing, computer science, business, tourism and similar fields. There was 1 student in the professional program.

As of 2000, there were 23 students in Paradiso who came from another municipality, while 317 residents attended schools outside the municipality.

== Transport ==
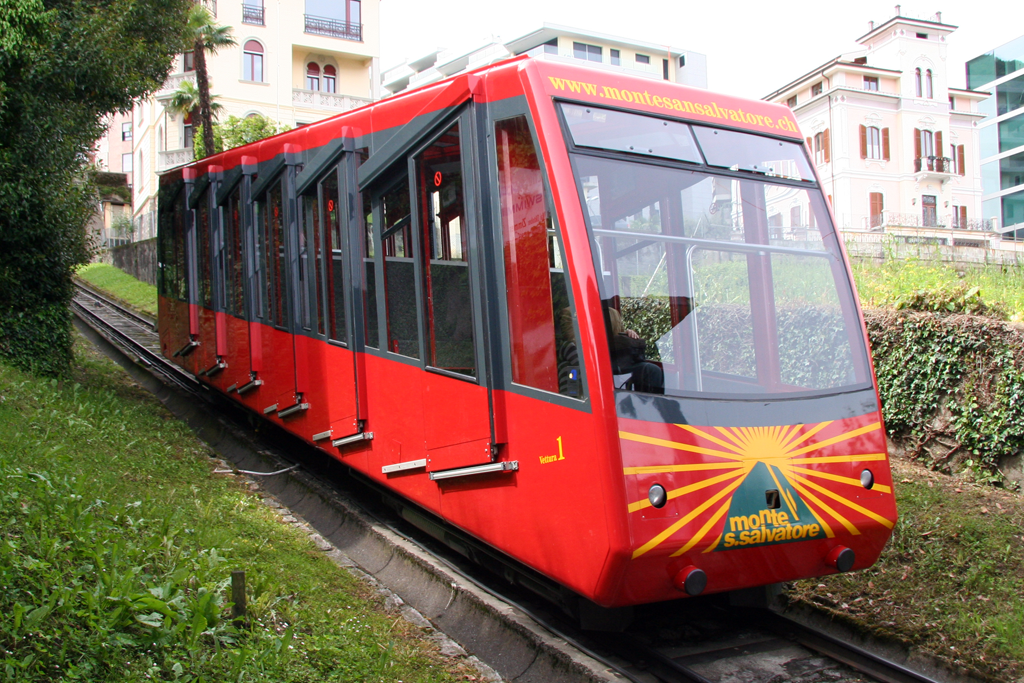
Monte San Salvatore funicular

Paradiso railway station, on the Swiss Federal Railway's Gotthard Railway, is served by regular trains of the Treni Regionali Ticino Lombardia (TILO), which operate every half-hour between Bellinzona, Lugano and Chiasso. Some TILO trains continue to Milan in Italy, but most international trains pass through Paradiso without stopping, necessitating a change at Chiasso.

Paradiso is also connected to central Lugano by frequent bus services, operated by the Trasporti Pubblici Luganesi (TPL). TPL routes 1 and 2 both serve Paradiso, and each provides a bus every 15 minutes or less.

Boats of the Società Navigazione del Lago di Lugano (SNL) provide services on Lake Lugano, principally for tourist purposes, but also connecting Paradiso with other lake-side communities, some of which have no road access. The Monte San Salvatore funicular connects Paradiso with the summit of Monte San Salvatore.
