= Monte San Salvatore =

Mountain in Switzerland

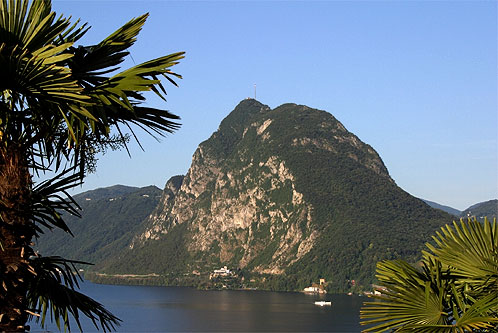

Highest point
- Elevation: 912 m (2,992 ft)
- Prominence: 602 m (1,975 ft)
- Coordinates: 45°58′37.3″N 8°56′50.1″E

Geography
- Location within Switzerland
- Location: Ticino, Switzerland
- Parent range: Lugano Prealps

Climbing
- Easiest route: Hike or ride Monte San Salvatore funicular

The Monte San Salvatore (912 m) is a mountain in the Lepontine Alps above Lake Lugano and the city of Lugano in Switzerland. The Monte San Salvatore funicular links the city with the summit of the mountain.

One of the villages on the slopes of Monte San Salvatore, Carona, is a popular destination to enjoy views over Lake Lugano and to walk through the exotic plants and flowers of Parco San Grato.

== Gallery ==
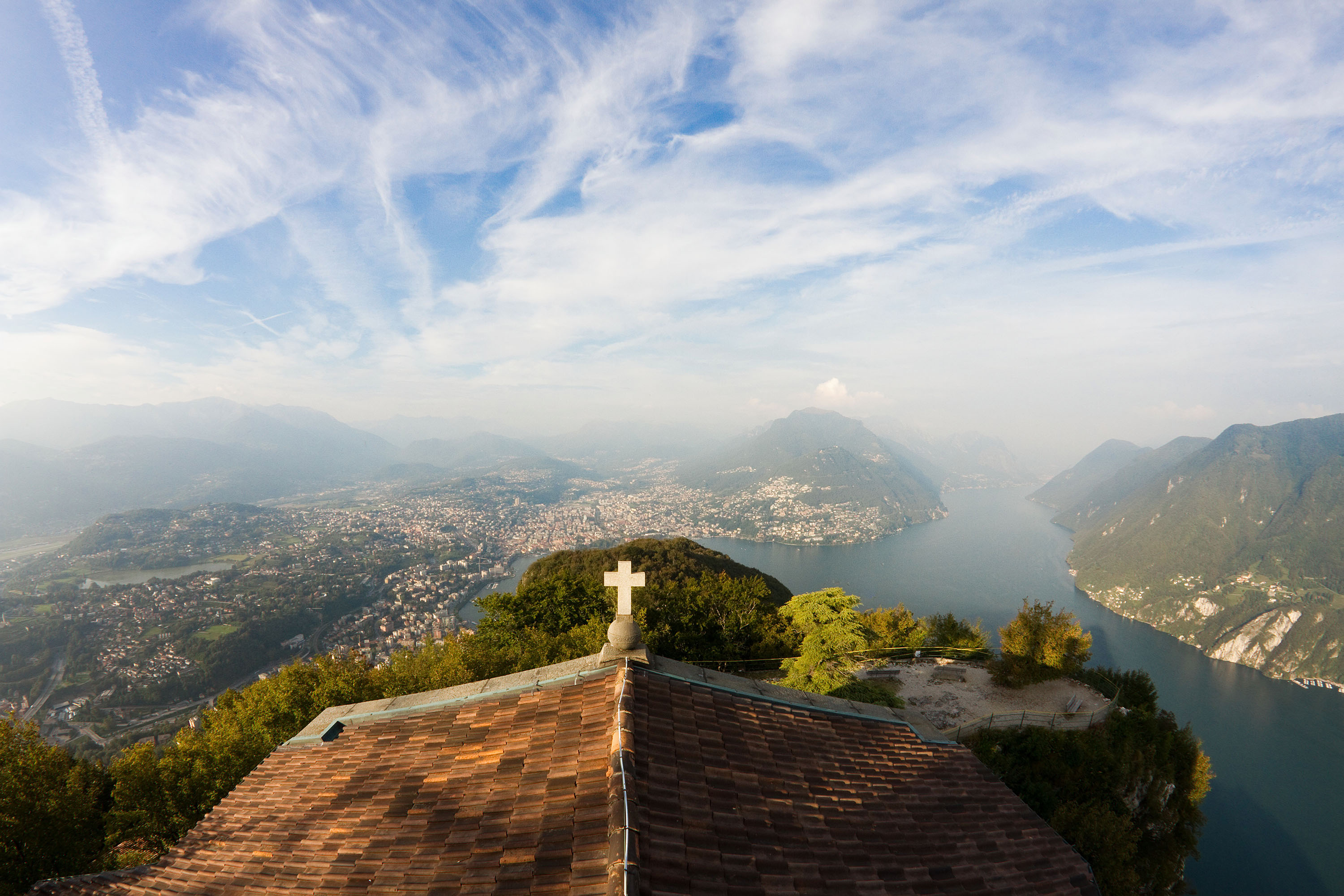
View of Lugano and its surroundings from Monte San Salvatore.

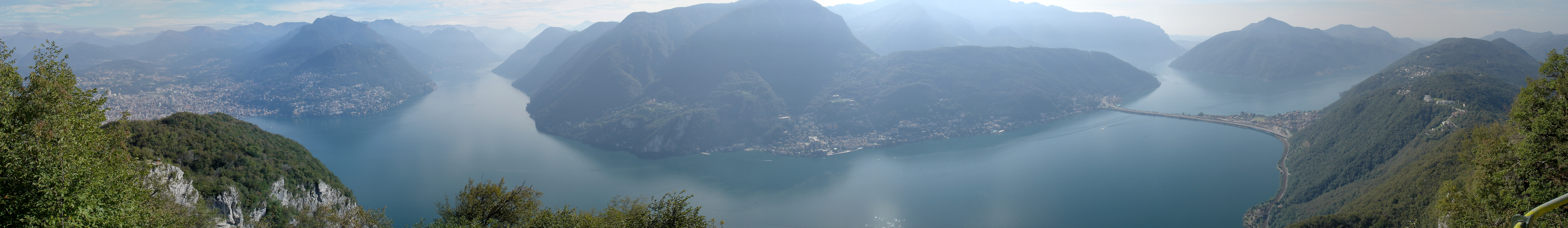
View of Lake Lugano from Monte San Salvatore, with Lugano to the left and the Melide causeway to the right

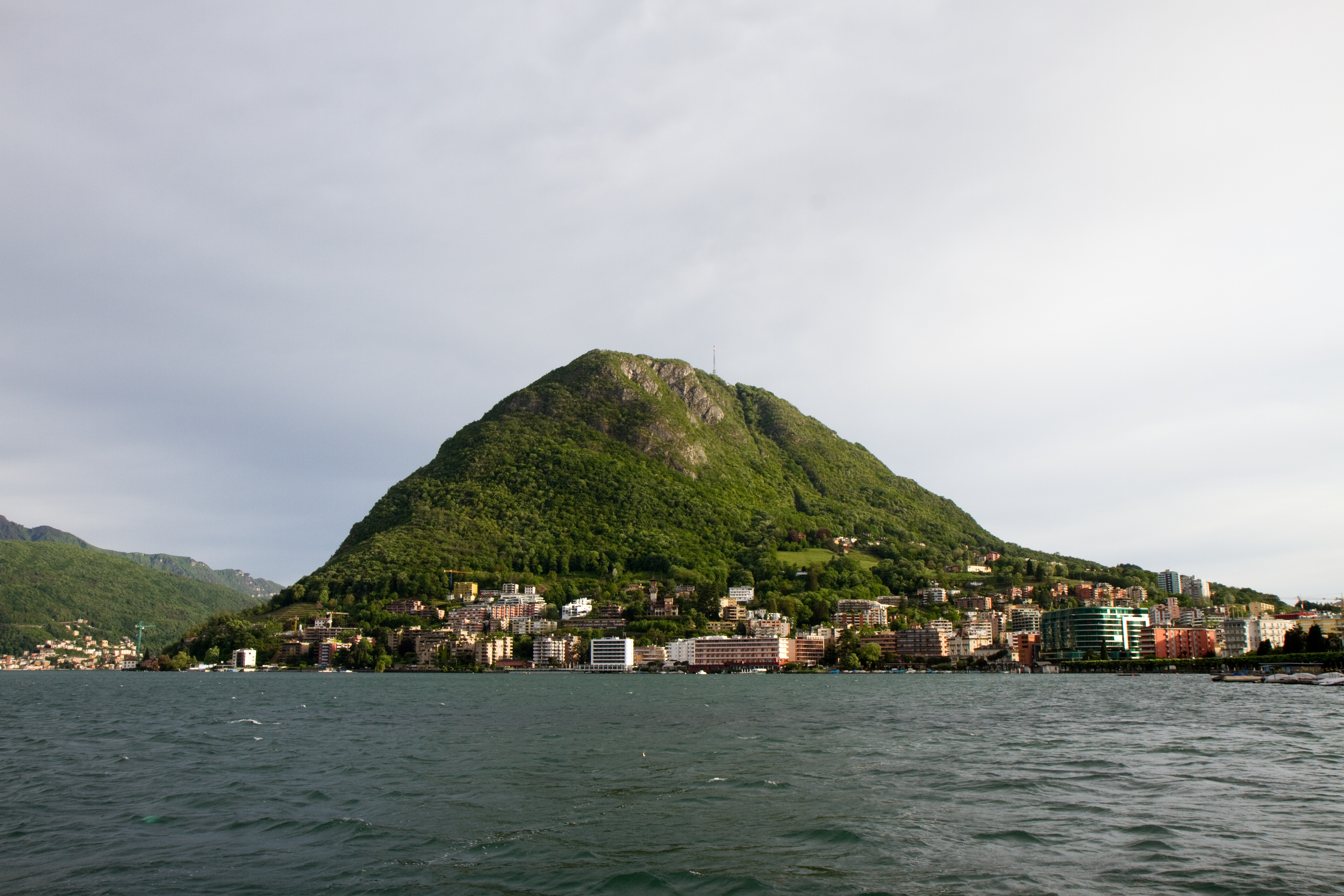
Monte San Salvatore, as seen from Piazza Luini, Lugano.

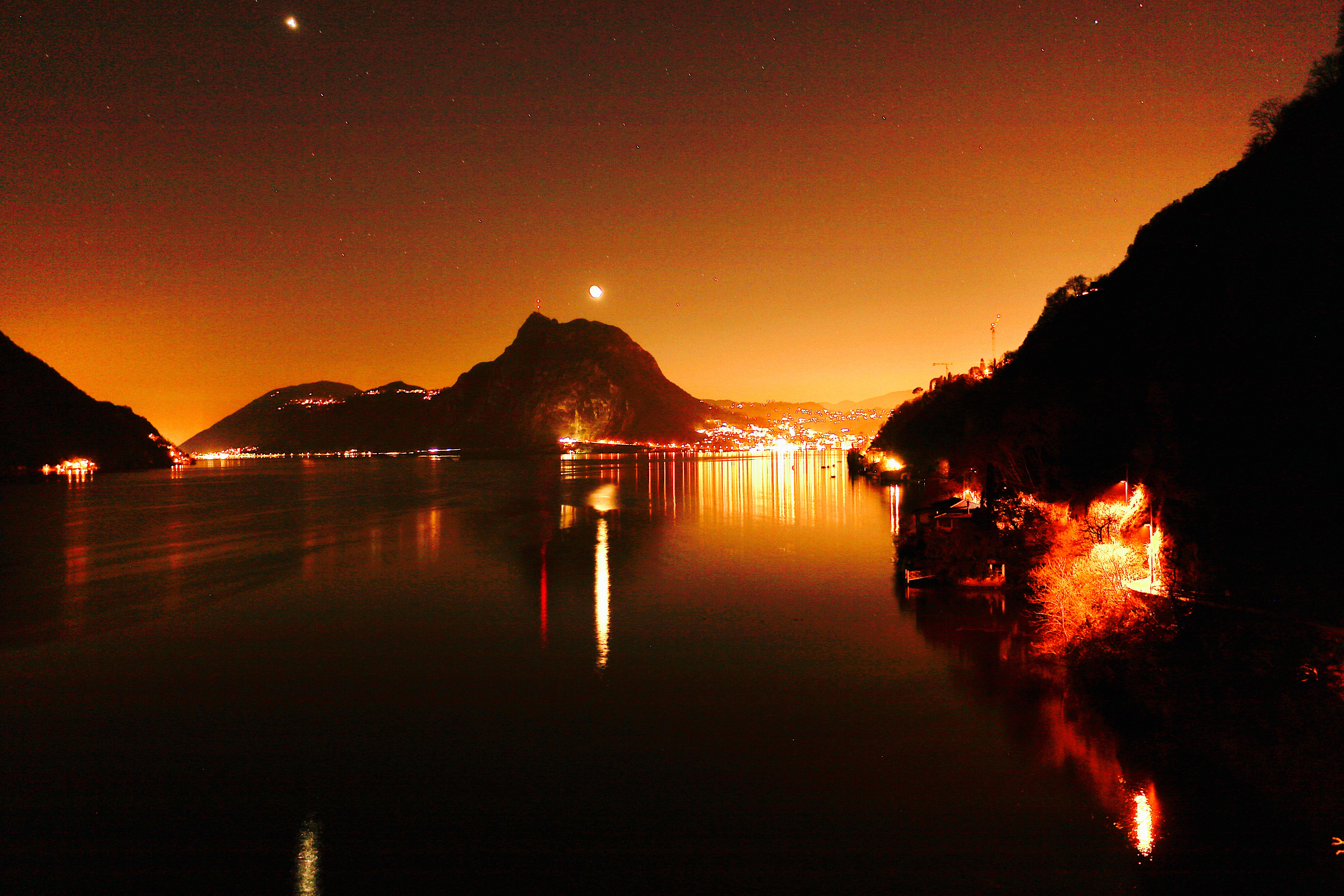
Monte San Salvatore at Night seen from Gandria

== See also ==
- List of mountains of Switzerland accessible by public transport
