= Mendrisio San Martino railway station =

Swiss railway station

Mendrisio San Martino
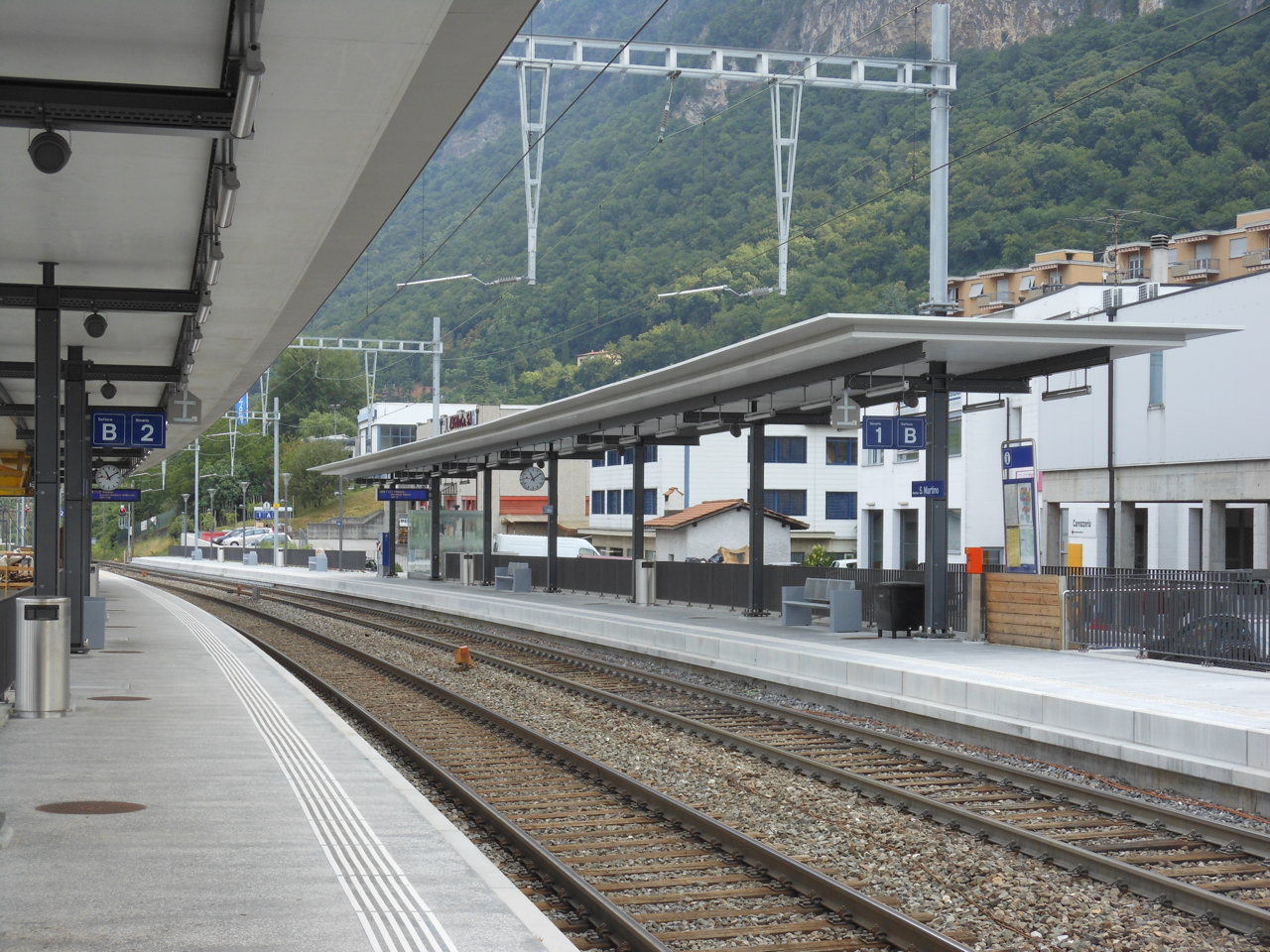
- The station platforms in 2014

General information
- Location: Mendrisio; Switzerland
- Coordinates: 45°52′40″N 8°58′59″E
- Elevation: 319 m (1,047 ft)
- Owner: Swiss Federal Railways
- Line: Gotthard line
- Train operators: Treni Regionali Ticino Lombardia
- Connections: Autopostale and local buses

History
- Opened: 15 December 2013

Services
Preceding station	TiLo	Following station
Capolago-Riva San Vitale towards Airolo	S10	Mendrisio towards Como San Giovanni
Capolago-Riva San Vitale towards Airolo	S50	Mendrisio towards Malpensa Aeroporto Terminal 2
Capolago-Riva San Vitale towards Giubiasco	S90	Mendrisio Terminus
Location

Mendrisio San Martino railway station (Italian: Stazione di Mendrisio San Martino) is a railway station in the municipality of Mendrisio, in the Swiss canton of Ticino. It is an intermediate stop on the standard gauge Gotthard line of Swiss Federal Railways.

The station, located near the Foxtown centre and several factories, makes the commercial and industrial area accessible to a large catchment area that uses public transport for its journeys.

== Services ==
As of the December 2021 timetable change, the following services stop at Mendrisio San Martino:

- S10 / S50: half-hourly service between Biasca and Mendrisio and hourly service to Chiasso, Como San Giovanni, or Malpensa Aeroporto Terminal 2.
- S90: hourly service between Giubiasco and Mendrisio.
