= Stabio railway station =

Railway station in Switzerland

Stabio
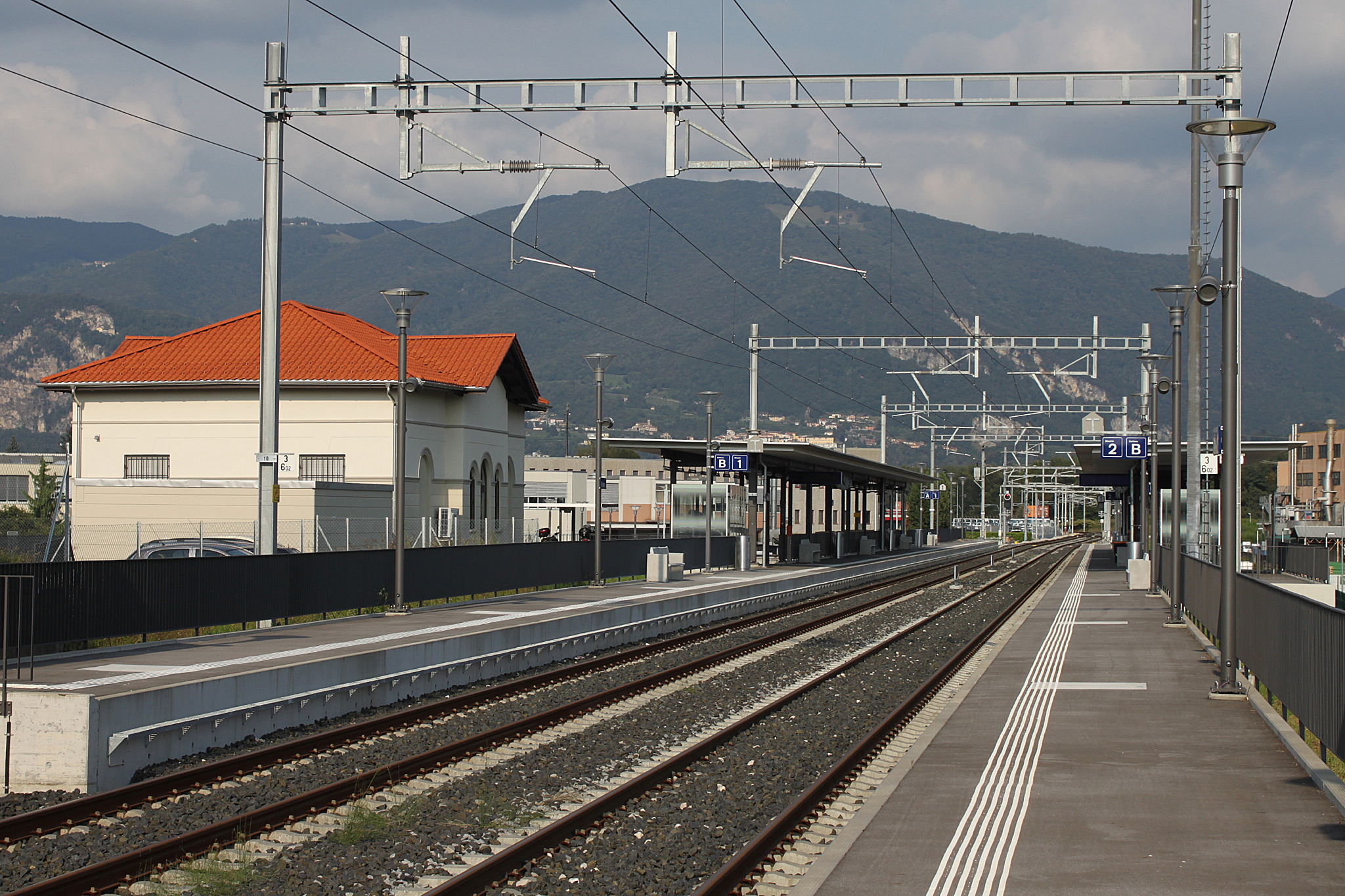
- The station in 2015

General information
- Location: Stabio; Switzerland
- Coordinates: 45°50′59″N 8°56′38″E
- Owner: Swiss Federal Railways
- Line: Mendrisio–Varese line
- Distance: 3.8 km (2.4 mi) from Mendrisio
- Train operators: Treni Regionali Ticino Lombardia
- Connections: Autopostale buses

Other information
- Fare zone: 140 (arcobaleno)

Passengers
- 2018: 960 per weekday

Services
Preceding station	TiLo	Following station
Cantello-Gaggiolo towards Malpensa Aeroporto Terminal 2	S50	Mendrisio towards Bellinzona
Cantello-Gaggiolo towards Varese	S40	Mendrisio towards Como San Giovanni
Location
- Location within Switzerland Location within Canton of Ticino

Stabio railway station (Italian: Stazione di Stabio) is a railway station in the municipality of Stabio, in the Swiss canton of Ticino. It is an intermediate stop on the standard gauge Mendrisio–Varese line of Swiss Federal Railways.

== Services ==
The following services stop at Stabio:

- S40/S50: half-hourly service to Varese and hourly service to Malpensa Aeroporto Terminal 2 and Bellinzona.

== See also ==
- Rail transport in Switzerland
