= Balerna railway station =

Railway station in Balerna, Ticino, Switzerland

Balerna
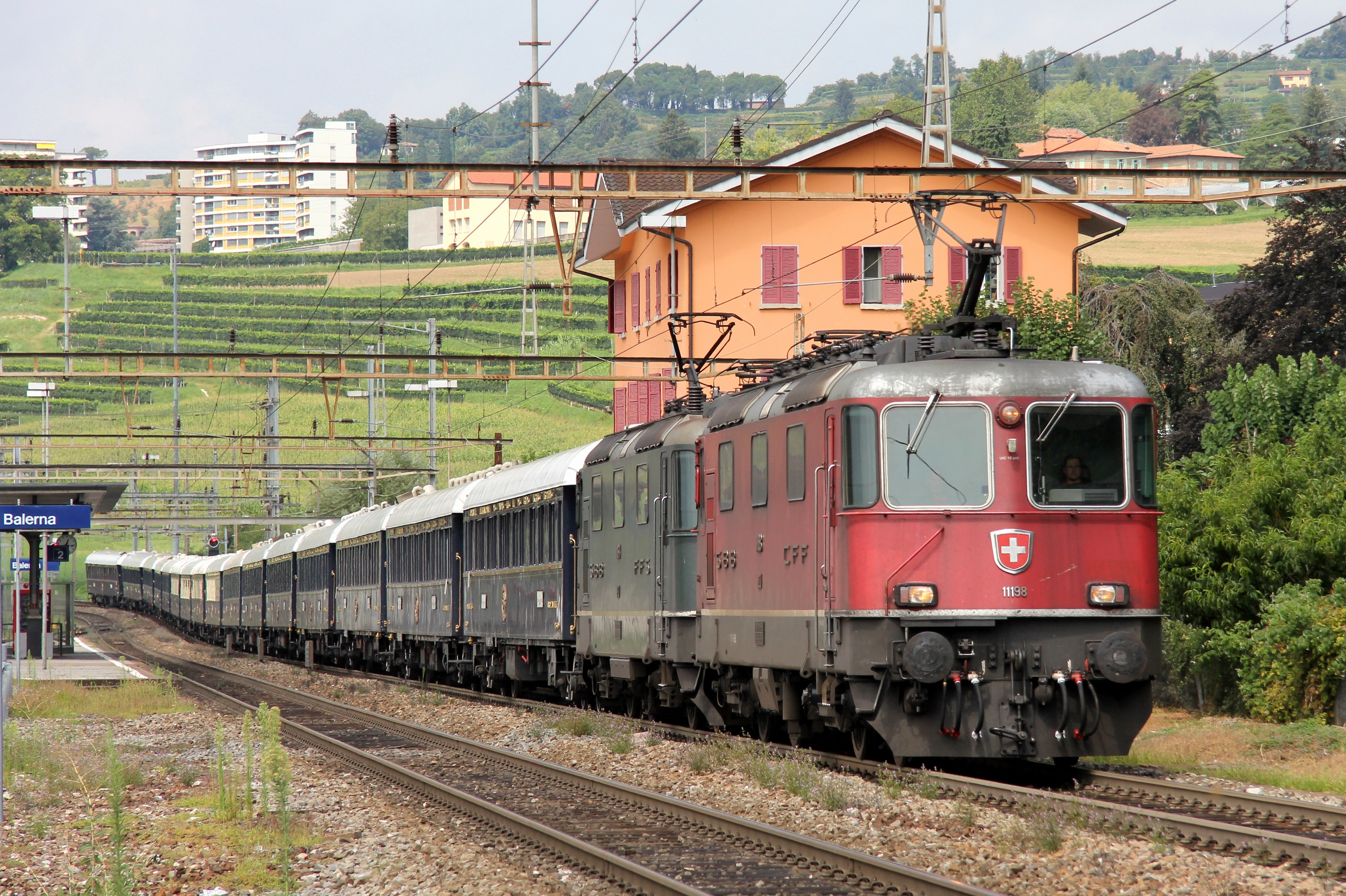
- A SBB-CFF-FFS Re 420 leads the Venice-Simplon Orient Express through the station in 2016

General information
- Location: Via Stazione; Balerna; Switzerland
- Coordinates: 45°50′48″N 9°00′18″E
- Elevation: 269 m (883 ft)
- Owner: Swiss Federal Railways
- Line: Gotthard line
- Distance: 203.5 km (126.4 mi) from Immensee
- Train operators: Treni Regionali Ticino Lombardia
- Connections: Autopostale buses

Services
Preceding station	TiLo	Following station
Mendrisio towards Airolo	S10	Chiasso towards Como San Giovanni
Mendrisio towards Varese	S40	Chiasso towards Como San Giovanni
Location

Balerna railway station (Italian: Stazione di Balerna) is a railway station in the Swiss canton of Ticino and the municipality of Balerna. The station is on the Swiss Federal Railways Gotthard railway, between Lugano and Chiasso.

== Services ==
As of the December 2021 timetable change, the following services stop at Balerna:

- S10: half-hourly service between Biasca and Chiasso, with every other train continuing from Chiasso to Como San Giovanni.
- S40: hourly service between Varese and Como San Giovanni.
