= Montanstahl =

Montanstahl AG is a steel manufacturer headquartered in Stabio, Switzerland.

== History ==
Montanstahl AG was founded in 1983 in Stabio by Karl Otto Stumm as a manufacturer of hot-rolled carbon and stainless steel profiles.

In the early 2000s, following the development and industrialization of laser welding technology, Montanstahl expanded its operations to the United States and established the Stainless Structurals company in Conroe, United States. In 2007, the company's U.S. affiliate, Stainless Structurals, purchased land in Conroe Park North in Montgomery County, Texas, to construct a manufacturing facility for laser welded stainless steel shapes.

In July 2021, Montanstahl expanded its manufacturing capacity in Germany by taking over the hot extrusion plant of the former Hoesch Schwerter Extruded Profiles. The agreement, announced by the city of Schwerte in North Rhine-Westphalia, preserved approximately 65 jobs and led to the establishment of Montanstahl GmbH.

On October 10, 2023, Montanstahl acquired Siderval S.p.A., a manufacturer of hot-rolled extruded profiles based in Talamona, Italy, from a fund managed by DeA Capital.

In April 2025, Montanstahl acquired Extralloys, a hot-extrusion plant in Tunica, United States.

== Manufacturing ==
Montanstahl is headquartered in Stabio, with manufacturing facilities in Switzerland, Germany, Italy and the United States. The company uses multiple production processes to manufacture profiles in steel qualities such as carbon steel, stainless steel, duplex steel, and other nickel-based alloys and Titanium with specific edge geometries and surface requirements.

The group's U.S. operations at the Conroe, Texas facility employs laser fusion for the production of standard profiles in stainless steel and custom shapes. In March 2024, the U.S. subsidiary completed the installation of a 1.97-megawatt rooftop solar array at the site.

European operations include the Schwerte facility in Germany and the Siderval plant in Italy, which provide hot-extrusion capabilities for complex custom shapes in steel and special alloys.
