= Giubiasco railway station =

Railway station in Switzerland

Giubiasco
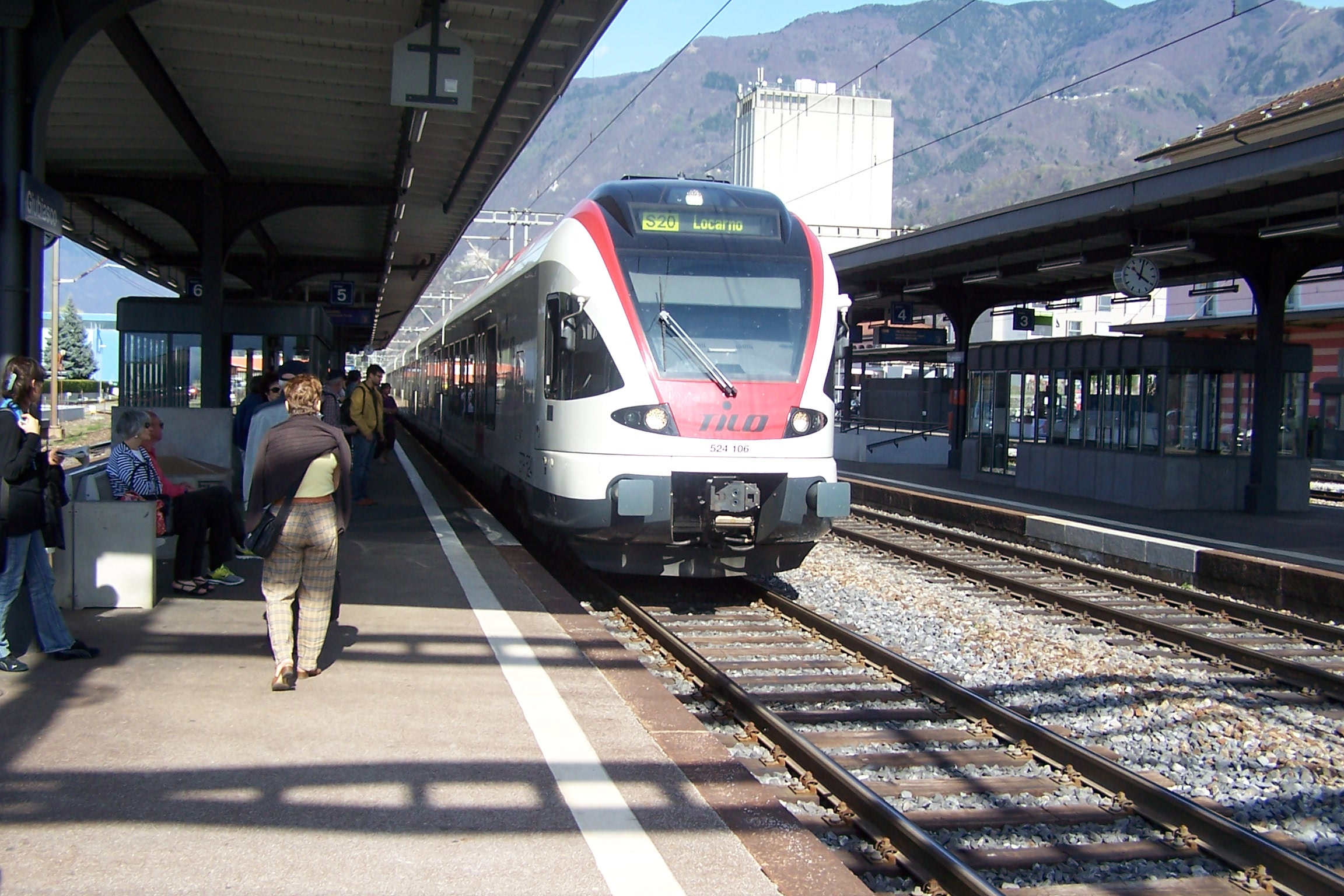
- A Flirt unit of TILO in the station in 2012

General information
- Location: Viale Stazione; Giubiasco; Switzerland
- Coordinates: 46°10′26″N 9°00′13″E
- Elevation: 230 m (750 ft)
- Owner: Swiss Federal Railways
- Lines: Giubiasco–Locarno line; Gotthard line
- Distance: 154.0 km (95.7 mi) from Immensee
- Platforms: 4
- Train operators: Südostbahn; Treni Regionali Ticino Lombardia
- Connections: Autopostale bus services

Other information
- Fare zone: 200 (arcobaleno)

Passengers
- 2018: 8,100 per weekday

Services
Preceding station	Südostbahn	Following station
Bellinzona towards Basel SBB	IR 26	Cadenazzo towards Locarno
Bellinzona towards Zürich HB	IR 46	Cadenazzo towards Locarno
Preceding station	TiLo	Following station
Bellinzona towards Airolo	S10	Lugano towards Como San Giovanni
Bellinzona towards Castione-Arbedo	S20	Sant'Antonino towards Locarno
Bellinzona towards Airolo	S50	Lugano towards Malpensa Aeroporto Terminal 2
Terminus	S90	Rivera-Bironico towards Mendrisio
Location

Giubiasco railway station (Italian: Stazione di Giubiasco) is a railway station in the Swiss canton of Ticino and municipality of Bellinzona. The station is on the Swiss Federal Railways Gotthard railway, between Bellinzona and Lugano, and is a junction point with several other lines.

To the south of Giubasco, the Gotthard Railway leaves the valley of the river Ticino that it has followed since it left the Gotthard Tunnel, and heads for Lake Lugano. Just to the south of Giubiasco station, the Gotthard railway's original line diverges to the south and commences its steep climb to the high-level Monte Ceneri Tunnel under the Monte Ceneri Pass. However most trains no longer take this route, but instead continue along the main line and take the Ceneri Base Tunnel (opened in December 2020) direct to Lugano. Just beyond the junction with the original line, a second triangular junction connects the new Gotthard main line with the Luino–Bellinzona railway, which in turn has a branch to Locarno.

As a major junction station, Giubiasco has two island platforms serving four platform tracks, together with a number of freight tracks. However, most long-distance passenger trains pass through the station without stopping, serving instead Bellinzona station, one stop to the north.

== Services ==
As of the December 2021 timetable change, the following services stop at Giubiasco:

- InterRegio: hourly service between Locarno and Arth-Goldau; trains continue to Basel SBB or Zürich Hauptbahnhof.
- S10 / S50: half-hourly service between Biasca and Mendrisio and hourly service to Chiasso, Como San Giovanni, or Malpensa Aeroporto Terminal 2.
- S20: half-hourly service between Castione-Arbedo and Locarno.
- S90: half-hourly service to Lugano and hourly service to Mendrisio.

== Gallery ==
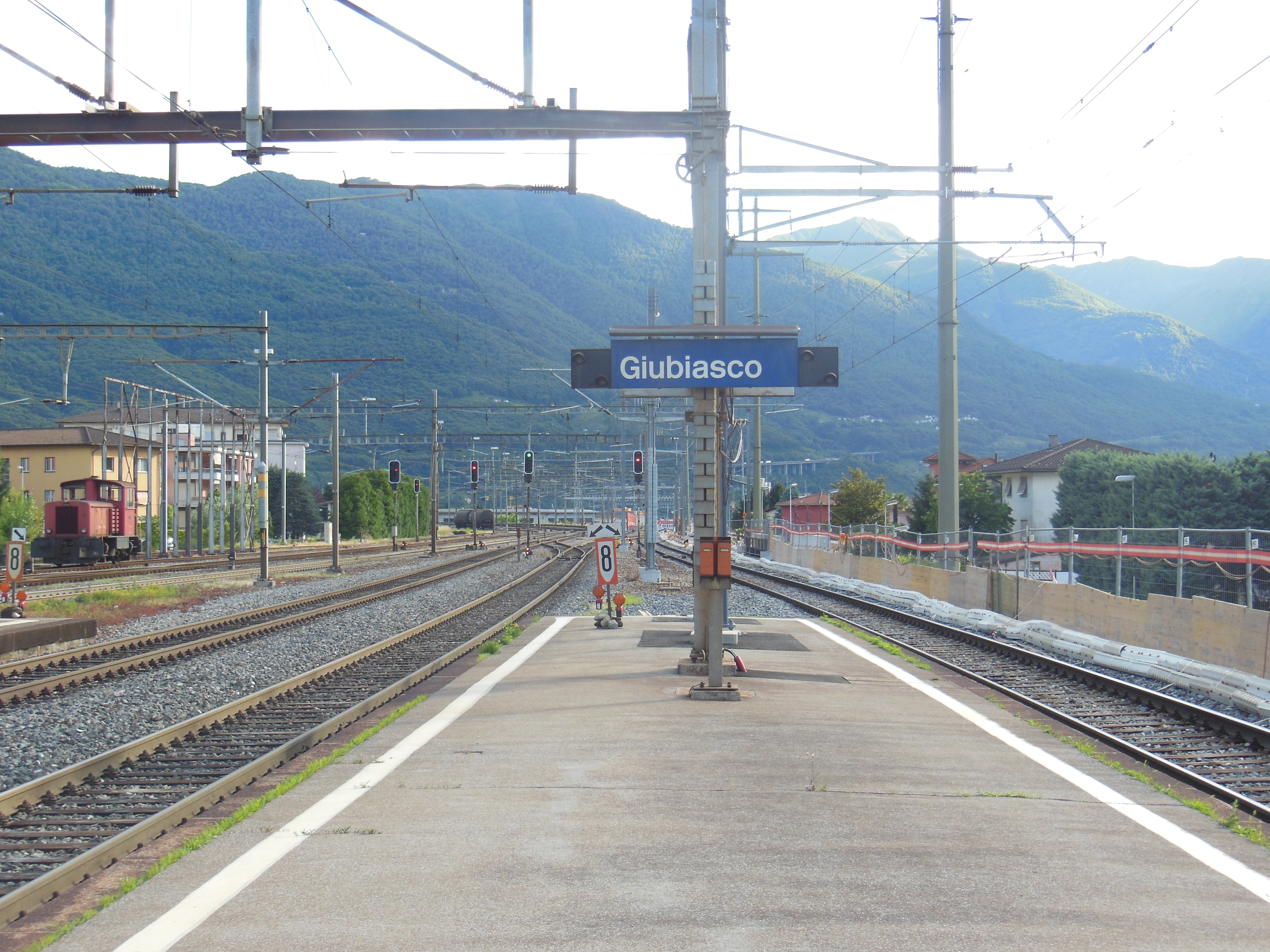
The station looking south with Monte Ceneri in the background

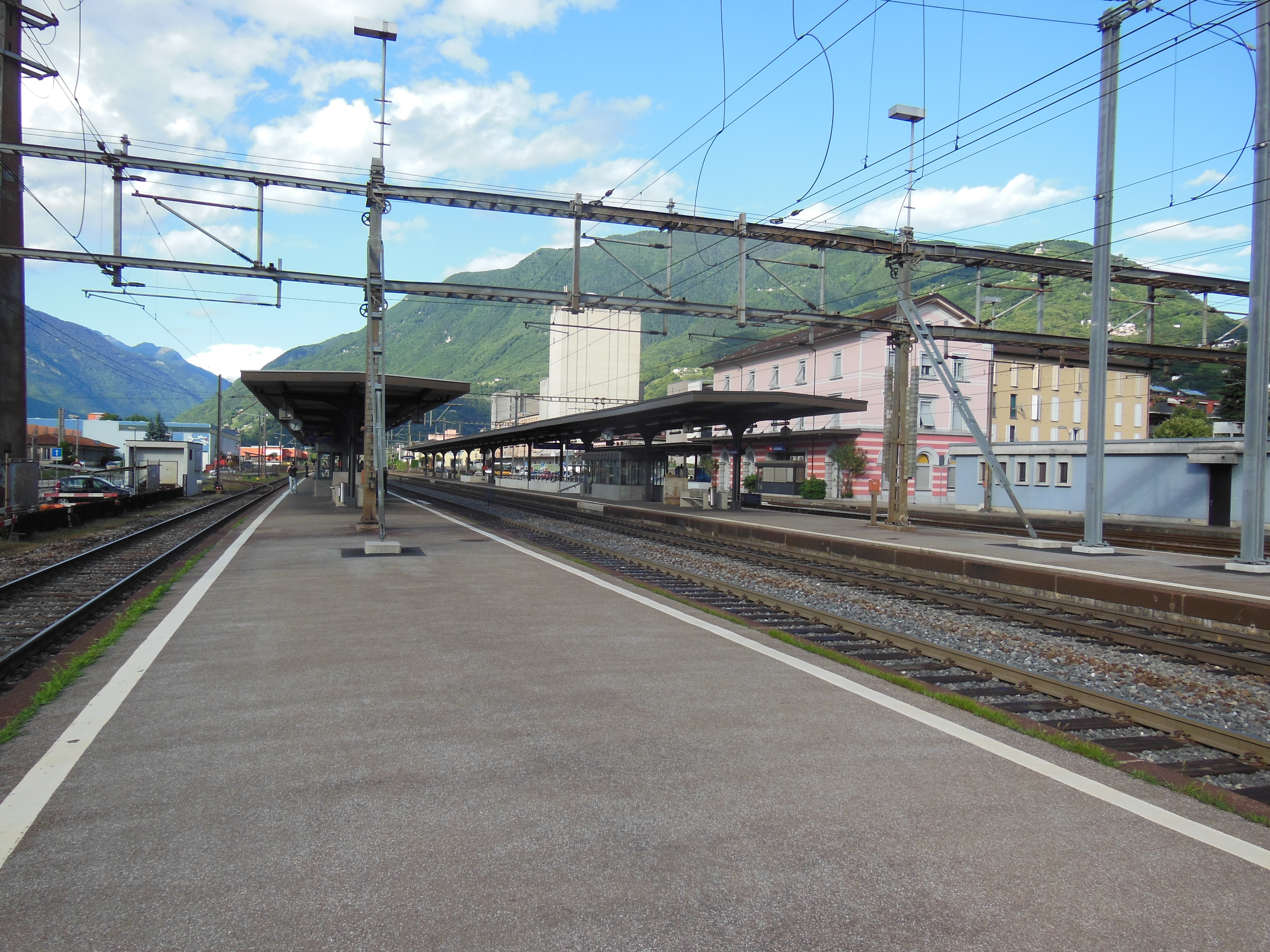
The station and station buildings looking north
