= Stabio =

- Municipality
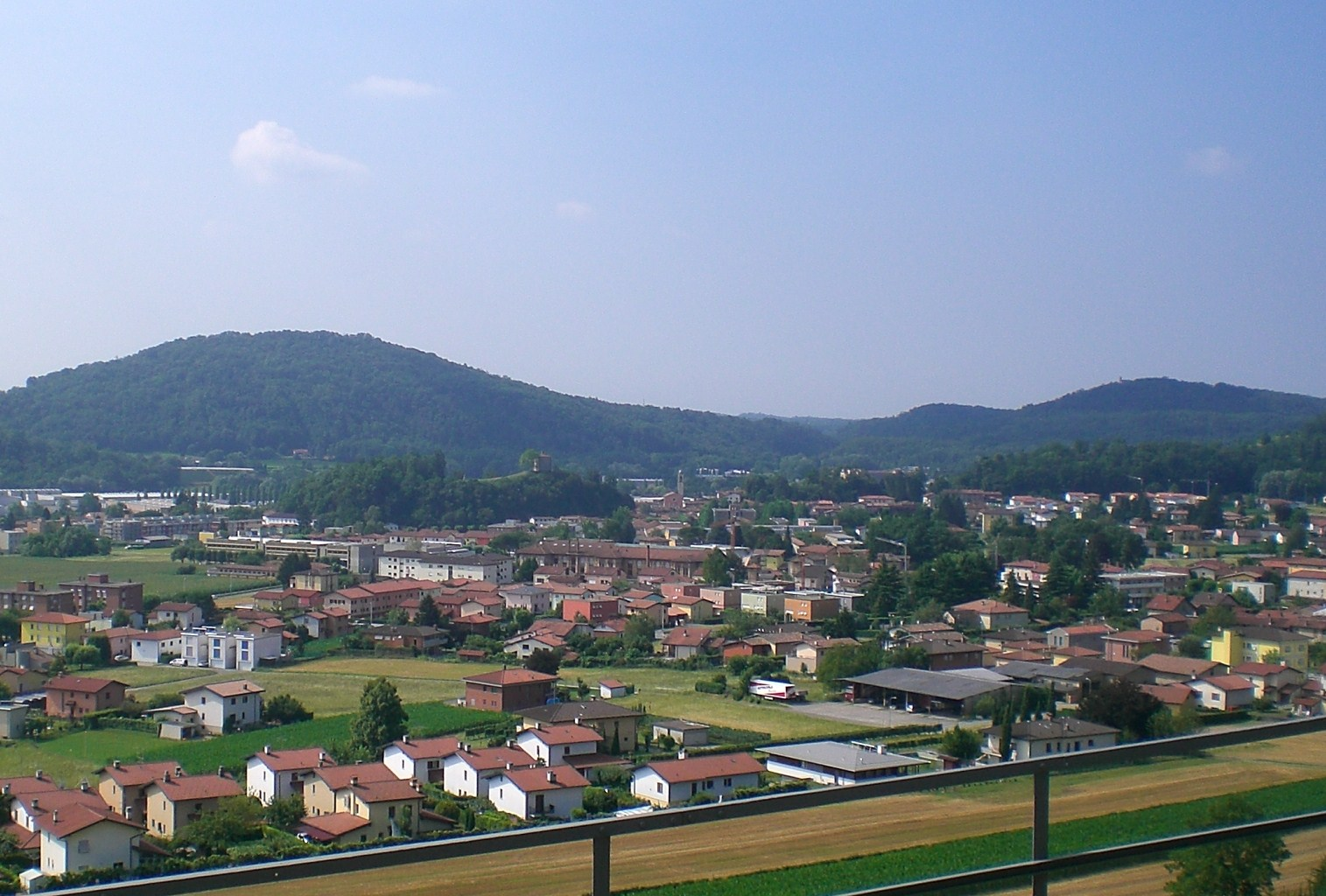
- Stabio village

- Flag Coat of arms
- Location of Stabio
- Location within Switzerland Location within Canton of Ticino
- Coordinates: 45°51′N 8°56′E
- Country: Switzerland
- Canton: Ticino
- District: Mendrisio

Government
  - Mayor: Sindaco; Claudio Cavadini

Area
  - Total: 6.15 km^{2} (2.37 sq mi)
- Elevation: 352 m (1,155 ft)

Population (December 2009)
  - Total: 4.330
  - Density: 0.704/km^{2} (1.82/sq mi)
- Time zone: UTC+01:00 (CET)
  - Summer (DST): UTC+02:00 (CEST)
- Postal code: 6855
- SFOS number: 5266
- ISO 3166 code: CH-TI
- Surrounded by: Bizzarone (IT-CO), Cantello (IT-VA), Clivio (IT-VA), Mendrisio, Ligornetto, Rodero (IT-CO)
- Website: stabio.ch

Stabio is a municipality in the district of Mendrisio in the canton of Ticino in Switzerland.

== History ==
Aerial view (1946)

Stabio is first mentioned in 1067 as Stabio.

Excavations in the area around S. Pietro have found evidence of continuous settlements from about 400 BC to the 7th century AD. There are burial grounds from the Iron Age followed by a burial ground and patrician residential structures from the Roman era, traces of the cult of Mercury and numerous Lombards graves. In 1999, the rich grave goods of a Lombard warrior were discovered.

In 1181, the Orelli family of Locarno gained the tithe rights in the region from the Bishop of Como. In 1275, both the monastery of S. Abbondio in Como and the Benedictine abbey of Sant'Ambrogio in Milan owned property and rights in Stabio.

On 22 October 1876 a serious clash between conservatives and liberals in Stabio claimed three lives, which led to a Federal mediation between the two sides.

Religiously, Stabio belonged to the Vicariate of Mendrisio, from which it separated itself in 1575. The old parish church of SS. Pietro e Lucia, dates back to the 7th century, and was rebuilt in the 12th and 13th centuries. The current parish church of SS. Giacomo e Cristoforo martire is first mentioned in 1275. It was rebuilt at the end of the 16th century and expanded in the 18th and 20th centuries.

Traditionally, the main occupations were agriculture, livestock tending, and viticulture. Due to limited farming land, there was some emigration of artisans and artists, first to the cities of northern Italy and central Italy, and later overseas. In the 19th century, the silk and later the tobacco industry developed in the municipality. The first factory in Stabio was the Realini shirt factory which was founded in 1902. It was acquired in 1976 by the Ermenegildo Zegna Group; in 2005 it had 900 employees. The hot springs were discovered in 1850 and led to the establishment of mineral baths in Stabio. The water is still being used for therapeutic treatments at the beginning of the 21st century.

In 1926 the Mendrisio–Stabio railway was opened, but closed after only two years in operation. Since the 1960s, the municipality has experienced a boom in the food, engineering, textiles and clothing as well as electric and hybrid vehicle industries. In 2005, 73% of the jobs in Stabio, many filled by commuters, were in the manufacturing sector.

Since 1981, Stabio is home to the Museum of the Agricultural Culture of Mendrisio Valley.

== Geography ==
Stabio has an area, as of 1997, of 6.15 square kilometers (2.37 sq mi). Of this area, 3.18 km^{2} (1.23 sq mi) or 51.7% is used for agricultural purposes, while 1.92 km^{2} (0.74 sq mi) or 31.2% is forested. Of the rest of the land, 1.79 km^{2} (0.69 sq mi) or 29.1% is settled (buildings or roads), 0.01 km^{2} (2.5 acres) or 0.2% is either rivers or lakes and 0.08 km^{2} (20 acres) or 1.3% is unproductive land.

Of the built up area, industrial buildings made up 8.3% of the total area while housing and buildings made up 13.2% and transportation infrastructure made up 5.0%. Power and water infrastructure as well as other special developed areas made up 2.1% of the area Out of the forested land, 26.2% of the total land area is heavily forested and 5.0% is covered with orchards or small clusters of trees. Of the agricultural land, 32.0% is used for growing crops, while 6.5% is used for orchards or vine crops and 13.2% is used for alpine pastures. All the water in the municipality is flowing water.

The municipality is located in the Mendrisio district, on the Italian border. It consists of the village of Stabio with the settlements of San Pietro and Gaggiolo.

== Coat of arms ==
The blazon of the municipal coat of arms is Per fess gules on a bend argent inscription STAB sable and azure a castle or issuant from coupeaux vert.

== Demographics ==
Stabio has a population (as of December 2020) of 4,491. As of 2008, 23.0% of the population are resident foreign nationals. Over the last 10 years (1997–2007) the population has changed at a rate of 17.3%.

Most of the population (as of 2000) speaks Italian language (3,204 or 88.3%), with German being second most common (184 or 5.1%) and French being third (44 or 1.2%). There are 3 people who speak Romansh.

As of 2008, the gender distribution of the population was 49.1% male and 50.9% female. The population was made up of 1,569 Swiss men (36.7% of the population), and 528 (12.4%) non-Swiss men. There were 1,738 Swiss women (40.7%), and 439 (10.3%) non-Swiss women. Of the population in the municipality 1,169 or about 32.2% were born in Stabio and lived there in 2000. There were 938 or 25.9% who were born in the same canton, while 381 or 10.5% were born somewhere else in Switzerland, and 1,100 or 30.3% were born outside of Switzerland.

In 2008 there were 31 live births to Swiss citizens and 6 births to non-Swiss citizens, and in same time span there were 24 deaths of Swiss citizens and 5 non-Swiss citizen deaths. Ignoring immigration and emigration, the population of Swiss citizens increased by 7 while the foreign population increased by 1. There were 2 Swiss men who emigrated from Switzerland and 7 Swiss women who immigrated back to Switzerland. At the same time, there were 16 non-Swiss men and 18 non-Swiss women who immigrated from another country to Switzerland. The total Swiss population change in 2008 (from all sources, including moves across municipal borders) was an increase of 99 and the non-Swiss population remained the same. This represents a population growth rate of 2.4%.

The age distribution, as of 2009, in Stabio is; 492 children or 11.5% of the population are between 0 and 9 years old and 515 teenagers or 12.0% are between 10 and 19. Of the adult population, 390 people or 9.1% of the population are between 20 and 29 years old. 670 people or 15.7% are between 30 and 39, 787 people or 18.4% are between 40 and 49, and 553 people or 12.9% are between 50 and 59. The senior population distribution is 449 people or 10.5% of the population are between 60 and 69 years old, 246 people or 5.8% are between 70 and 79, there are 172 people or 4.0% who are over 80.

As of 2000, there were 1,428 people who were single and never married in the municipality. There were 1,833 married individuals, 207 widows or widowers and 159 individuals who are divorced.

As of 2000, there were 1,447 private households in the municipality, and an average of 2.5 persons per household. There were 410 households that consist of only one person and 73 households with five or more people. Out of a total of 1,450 households that answered this question, 28.3% were households made up of just one person and 24 were adults who lived with their parents. Of the rest of the households, there are 306 married couples without children, 596 married couples with children There were 89 single parents with a child or children. There were 22 households that were made up unrelated people and 3 households that were made some sort of institution or another collective housing.

In 2000 there were 603 single family homes (or 66.6% of the total) out of a total of 905 inhabited buildings. There were 228 multi-family buildings (25.2%), along with 23 multi-purpose buildings that were mostly used for housing (2.5%) and 51 other use buildings (commercial or industrial) that also had some housing (5.6%). Of the single family homes 14 were built before 1919, while 133 were built between 1990 and 2000. The greatest number of single family homes (148) were built between 1919 and 1945.

In 2000 there were 1,654 apartments in the municipality. The most common apartment size was 4 rooms of which there were 532. There were 39 single room apartments and 435 apartments with five or more rooms. Of these apartments, a total of 1,441 apartments (87.1% of the total) were permanently occupied, while 164 apartments (9.9%) were seasonally occupied and 49 apartments (3.0%) were empty. As of 2007, the construction rate of new housing units was 10.7 new units per 1000 residents. The vacancy rate for the municipality, in 2008, was 1%.

The historical population is given in the following chart:

== Sights ==
The entire town of Stabio is designated as part of the Inventory of Swiss Heritage Sites.

== Politics ==
In the 2007 federal election the most popular party was the CVP which received 25.81% of the vote. The next three most popular parties were the FDP (22.47%), the SP (19.76%) and the Ticino League (18.45%). In the federal election, a total of 1,254 votes were cast, and the voter turnout was 48.5%.

In the 2007 Gran Consiglio election, there were a total of 2,600 registered voters in Stabio, of which 1,634 or 62.8% voted. 39 blank ballots and 3 null ballots were cast, leaving 1,592 valid ballots in the election. The most popular party was the PLRT which received 370 or 23.2% of the vote. The next three most popular parties were; the PPD+GenGiova (with 325 or 20.4%), the PS (with 289 or 18.2%) and the SSI (with 262 or 16.5%).

In the 2007 Consiglio di Stato election, 40 blank ballots and 6 null ballots were cast, leaving 1,591 valid ballots in the election. The most popular party was the PLRT which received 352 or 22.1% of the vote. The next three most popular parties were; the PS (with 325 or 20.4%), the PPD (with 320 or 20.1%) and the LEGA (with 296 or 18.6%).

== Economy ==
As of 2007, Stabio had an unemployment rate of 4.46%. As of 2005, there were 39 people employed in the primary economic sector and about 10 businesses involved in this sector. 2,875 people were employed in the secondary sector and there were 65 businesses in this sector. 1,003 people were employed in the tertiary sector, with 155 businesses in this sector. There were 1,796 residents of the municipality who were employed in some capacity, of which females made up 39.9% of the workforce.

In 2008 the total number of full-time equivalent jobs was 4,206. The number of jobs in the primary sector was 23, all of which were in agriculture. The number of jobs in the secondary sector was 3,089, of which 2,862 or (92.7%) were in manufacturing and 215 (7.0%) were in construction. The number of jobs in the tertiary sector was 1,094. In the tertiary sector; 568 or 51.9% were in wholesale or retail sales or the repair of motor vehicles, 131 or 12.0% were in the movement and storage of goods, 39 or 3.6% were in a hotel or restaurant, 10 or 0.9% were in the information industry, 21 or 1.9% were the insurance or financial industry, 53 or 4.8% were technical professionals or scientists, 67 or 6.1% were in education and 85 or 7.8% were in health care.

In 2000, there were 6,131 workers who commuted into the municipality and 1,155 workers who commuted away. The municipality is a net importer of workers, with about 5.3 workers entering the municipality for every one leaving. About 44.5% of the workforce coming into Stabio are coming from outside Switzerland, while 1.0% of the locals commute out of Switzerland for work. Of the working population, 5.6% used public transportation to get to work, and 69.2% used a private car.

== Religion ==
From the 2000 census, 3,015 or 83.1% were Roman Catholic, while 106 or 2.9% belonged to the Swiss Reformed Church. Of the rest of the population, there were 35 members of an Orthodox church (or about 0.96% of the population), there were 15 individuals (or about 0.41% of the population) who belonged to the Christian Catholic Church, and there were 50 individuals (or about 1.38% of the population) who belonged to another Christian church. There was 1 individual who was Jewish, and 46 (or about 1.27% of the population) who were Islamic. There were 4 individuals who were Buddhist, 33 individuals who were Hindu and 4 individuals who belonged to another church. 235 (or about 6.48% of the population) belonged to no church, are agnostic or atheist, and 83 individuals (or about 2.29% of the population) did not answer the question.

== Climate ==
Between 1961 and 1990 Stabio had an average of 96.8 days of rain or snow per year and on average received 1,490 mm (59 in) of precipitation. The wettest month was May during which time Stabio received an average of 186 mm (7.3 in) of rain or snow. During this month there was precipitation for an average of 11.8 days. The driest month of the year was December with an average of 66 mm (2.6 in) of precipitation over 5.5 days. On 21 July 2022, a maximum temperature of 36.5 °C (97.7 °F) was registered in Stabio.

Climate data for Stabio, elevation 351 m (1,152 ft), (1991–2020)
Month	Jan	Feb	Mar	Apr	May	Jun	Jul	Aug	Sep	Oct	Nov	Dec	Year
Mean daily maximum °C (°F)	7.5 (45.5)	9.5 (49.1)	14.1 (57.4)	17.4 (63.3)	21.5 (70.7)	25.7 (78.3)	28.0 (82.4)	27.4 (81.3)	22.5 (72.5)	17.1 (62.8)	11.7 (53.1)	7.7 (45.9)	17.5 (63.5)
Daily mean °C (°F)	1.6 (34.9)	3.1 (37.6)	7.6 (45.7)	11.3 (52.3)	15.7 (60.3)	19.7 (67.5)	21.7 (71.1)	21.1 (70.0)	16.6 (61.9)	11.9 (53.4)	6.7 (44.1)	2.2 (36.0)	11.6 (52.9)
Mean daily minimum °C (°F)	−3.0 (26.6)	−2.6 (27.3)	1.0 (33.8)	4.8 (40.6)	9.6 (49.3)	13.6 (56.5)	15.4 (59.7)	15.3 (59.5)	11.4 (52.5)	7.4 (45.3)	2.4 (36.3)	−2.2 (28.0)	6.1 (43.0)
Average precipitation mm (inches)	73.6 (2.90)	74.9 (2.95)	82.9 (3.26)	140.6 (5.54)	171.5 (6.75)	146.7 (5.78)	121.4 (4.78)	138.7 (5.46)	156.1 (6.15)	160.5 (6.32)	202.2 (7.96)	91.2 (3.59)	1,560.3 (61.43)
Average precipitation days (≥ 1.0 mm)	5.5	5.4	6.4	10.1	10.9	9.7	7.4	8.5	8.1	8.8	9.6	6.2	96.6
Average relative humidity (%)	78	72	66	69	72	72	71	75	79	83	82	80	75
Mean monthly sunshine hours	121.1	139.4	183.4	178.3	200.6	228.9	267.7	241.2	172.9	126.3	100.9	101.9	2,062.6
Percentage possible sunshine	55	55	53	48	48	55	63	61	50	42	44	50	52
Source 1: NOAA
Source 2: MeteoSwiss

== Education ==
In Stabio about 1,347 or (37.1%) of the population have completed non-mandatory upper secondary education, and 352 or (9.7%) have completed additional higher education (either university or a Fachhochschule). Of the 352 who completed tertiary schooling, 48.3% were Swiss men, 27.3% were Swiss women, 15.6% were non-Swiss men and 8.8% were non-Swiss women.

In Stabio there were a total of 823 students (as of 2009). The Ticino education system provides up to three years of non-mandatory kindergarten and in Stabio there were 142 children in kindergarten. The primary school program lasts for five years and includes both a standard school and a special school. In the municipality, 253 students attended the standard primary schools and 9 students attended the special school. In the lower secondary school system, students either attend a two-year middle school followed by a two-year pre-apprenticeship or they attend a four-year program to prepare for higher education. There were 223 students in the two-year middle school and 2 in their pre-apprenticeship, while 65 students were in the four-year advanced program.

The upper secondary school includes several options, but at the end of the upper secondary program, a student will be prepared to enter a trade or to continue on to a university or college. In Ticino, vocational students may either attend school while working on their internship or apprenticeship (which takes three or four years) or may attend school followed by an internship or apprenticeship (which takes one year as a full-time student or one and a half to two years as a part-time student). There were 52 vocational students who were attending school full-time and 72 who attend part-time.

The professional program lasts three years and prepares a student for a job in engineering, nursing, computer science, business, tourism and similar fields. There were 5 students in the professional program.

As of 2000, there were 113 students in Stabio who came from another municipality, while 140 residents attended schools outside the municipality.

Stabio is home to the Dipartimento Sanità (DSAN) library.

== Transportation ==
The municipality has a railway station, Stabio, on the Mendrisio–Varese line. It has regular service to Malpensa Aeroporto Terminal 2, Varese, Bellinzona, and Como San Giovanni.
