= Valmorea railway =

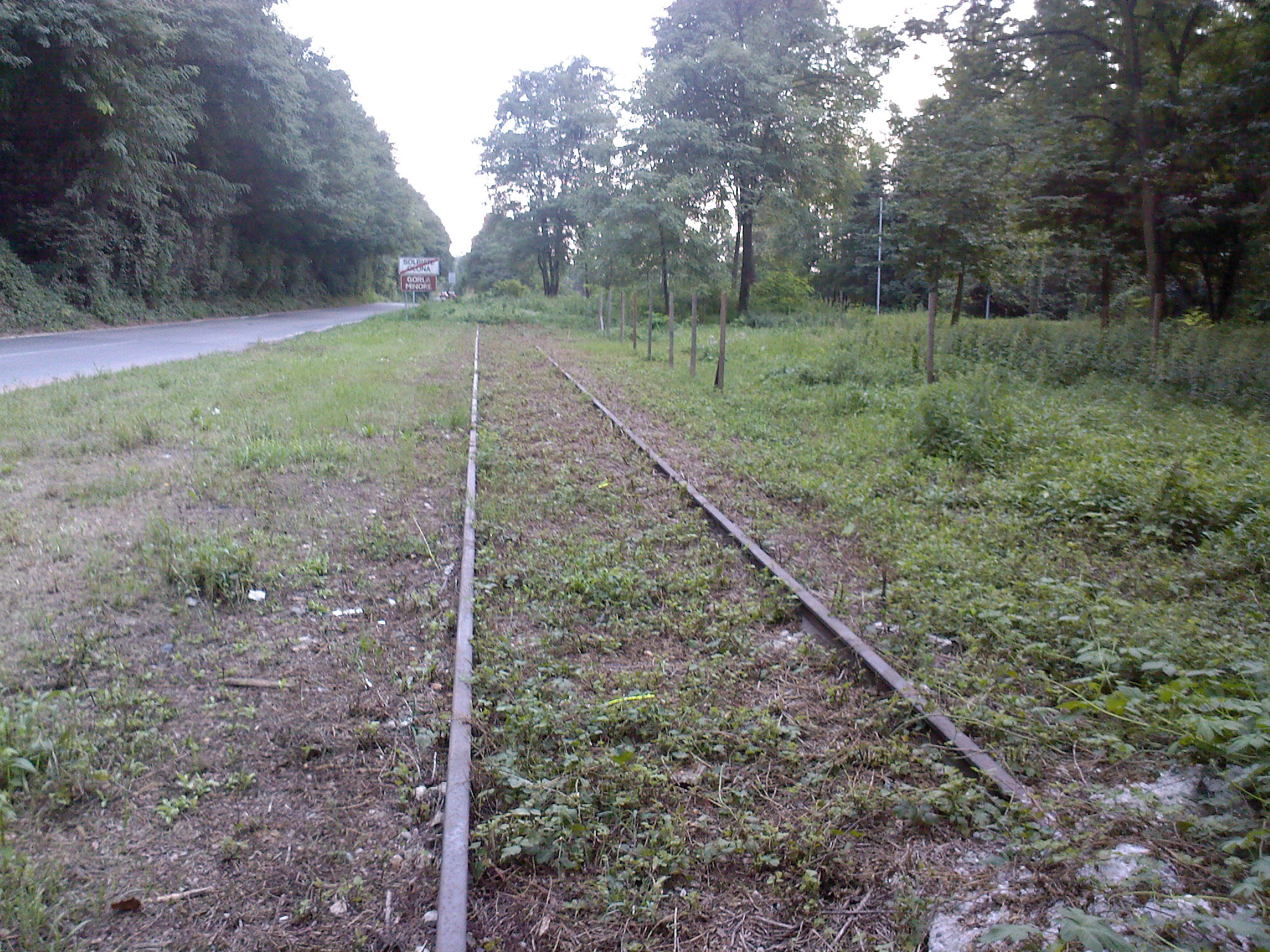
- Abandoned rail tracks near Solbiate Olona

Overview
- Status: partially in use
- Locale: Lombardy, Italy
- Termini: Castellanza railway station; Swiss border by Valmorea

Service
- Operator(s): Ferrovienord

History
- Opened: June 28, 1926

Technical
- Line length: 31.194 km (19.383 mi)
- Number of tracks: 1
- Character: Heritage railway
- Track gauge: 1,435 mm (4 ft 8 1/2 in) standard gauge
- Electrification: no

Valmorea railway was a railway line in Lombardy, Italy.

Originally built as Olona Valley railway, to serve the industrial complexes of this region, it was later prolonged until the Swiss border by Valmorea, reached in 1926, where it continued as the Mendrisio–Stabio railway. But only two years later the border crossing was closed by the Italian government, which didn't agree with a privately owned international connection (the Italian section of the line was operated by Ferrovie Nord Milano).

The passenger traffic was suspended and the line was used only for internal freight traffic until 1977.

Since 1993 the line has been rebuilt from the Swiss side as a touristic line. The current terminus is Malnate Olona, but there are plans to reach Castiglione Olona.
