= S50 (TILO) =

Railway service in Italy and Switzerland

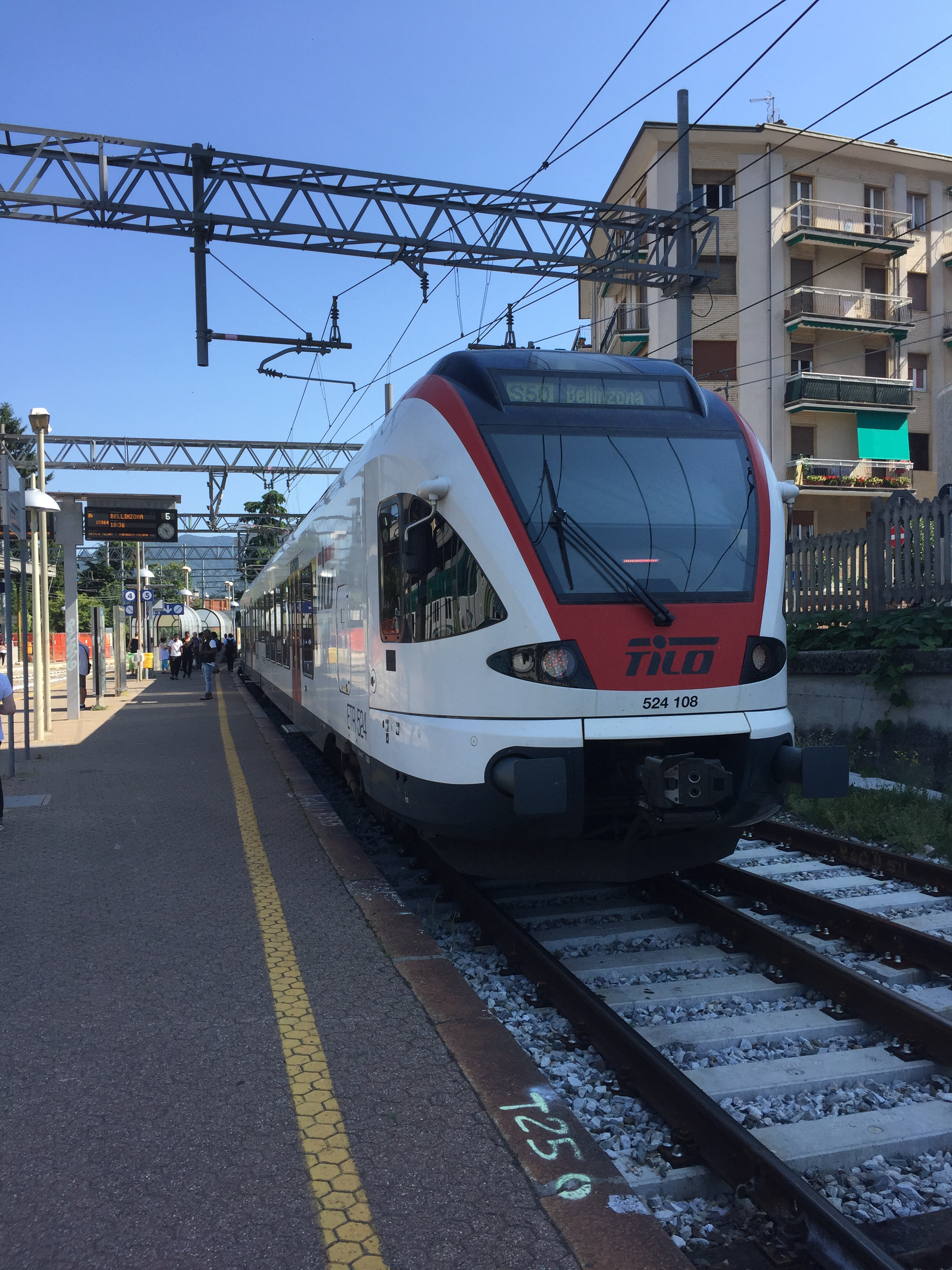
- A Bellinzona-bound S50 at Varese in 2018

Overview
- First service: 15 December 2014
- Current operator: Treni Regionali Ticino Lombardia

Route
- Termini: Biasca; Malpensa Aeroporto Terminal 1
- Average journey time: 2 hours 16 minutes
- Service frequency: 60 minutes
- Lines used: Gotthard line; Mendrisio–Varese line; Porto Ceresio–Milan line; Domodossola–Milan line; Saronno–Novara line; Busto Arsizio–Malpensa line

The S50 is a railway service that runs every hour between Biasca and Malpensa Aeroporto Terminal 1 in the Swiss canton of Ticino and the Italian state of Lombardy, respectively. Treni Regionali Ticino Lombardia (TILO), a joint venture of Swiss Federal Railways and Trenord, operates the service.

== Operations ==
The S50 runs every hour from Biasca to Malpensa Aeroporto Terminal 1. (Note: The normal southern terminus, Malpensa Aeroporto Terminal 2, is closed because of the COVID-19 pandemic.) It uses the Ceneri Base Tunnel between Giubiasco and Lugano, bypassing the traditional Gotthard route. The S50 and S10 operate as a single train between Biasca and Mendrisio. The S50 is paired with the S40 between Mendrisio and Varese, providing half-hourly service. South of Varese it runs express to Gallarate, complementing the half-hourly local service of Trenord's S5.

== History ==
The S50 was introduced on 15 December 2014, with the partial reopening of the Mendrisio–Varese line between Mendrisio and Stabio. The S50 operated hourly rush-hour services between Mendrisio and Stabio, with a limited number of trains operating to and from Bellinzona. It was paired with the S40, which continued from Mendrisio to Albate-Camerlata. The service did not operate on Sundays. The full reopening of the Mendrisio–Varese line on 7 January 2018 led to the extension of the S50 south to Varese and the increase of the frequency to hourly between Bellinzona and Varese. The S10 and S50 began operating as a single train between Bellinzona and Mendrisio. On 9 June 2019 the S50 and S40 swapped southern termini, with the S50 operating through to Malpensa Aeroporto and the S40 terminating at Varese.

The opening of the Ceneri Base Tunnel transformed regional services in Ticino. On 5 April 2021, the S50 and S10 began using the tunnel and bypassing all local stops between Giubiasco and Lugano. The northern terminus moved from Bellinzona to Biasca.
