= Bellinzona railway workers' strike of 2008 =

The Bellinzona railway workers strike of 2008 was a strike by railway workers against FFS Cargo (by its Italian acronym), a division of Swiss Railways. The dispute concerned a proposed company restructure that would include the loss of workers' jobs. The strike took place in the Swiss town of Bellinzona. It began on 7 March 2008 and concluded on 5 April 2008 when the restructure plans were withdrawn.

== Background ==
The Bellinzona plant of FFS Cargo, a state-owned company, was established in 1884 near the Bellinzona railway station and soon became an important repair facility for the Swiss rail network. At the time of the strike, approximately 430 people worked at the Bellinzona plant. Today (2012) it employs more than 500 workers. The workers at Bellinzona are represented by three labour unions: the Union of Transport Workers (SEV), Unia (a service sector union), and Transfair (a Christian trade union).

On 6 March 2008, FFS Cargo proposed a company restructuring program which was intended to improve efficiency and profitability. More than 400 jobs were to be eliminated by the restructure, including 126 in Bellinzona.

== Strike ==
When the restructuring plan was announced, workers at the Bellinzona downed tools and held an informal protest. A formal strike commenced on 7 March 2008. The workers demanded that all plans for job cuts be withdrawn. Workers' assemblies proposed alternative plans for the future management of those workshops which FFS Cargo intended to close.

FFS Cargo entered into negotiations with the workers during the strike. The company offered to suspend job cuts for two months if the strike was ended. This offer was rejected by the workers who instead insisted that no further negotiation was possible until the company provided full details of its future restructuring plans.

The strike comprised a range of tactics including pickets and factory occupations. The Bellinzona plant was occupied for four weeks, during which the rail tracks were welded together to prevent use of the workshop. Throughout March, solidarity protests were organised in other towns and cities including Bern, the Swiss capital, on 19 March 2008.

The strike was widely supported. A group of politicians in Ticino, the canton in which Bellinzona is located, launched a solidarity fund to provide financial support for the strike. The strike received political support from the Ticino canton government and the bishop of Ticino, who also coordinated financial assistance. Solidarity committees across Ticino raised more than one million francs (€600,000) in support of the strike.

== Aftermath ==
The proposed plan for job cuts was officially withdrawn on 5 April 2008 by the head of the Federal Department of Transport. The future of several FFS Cargo workshops remained undecided.

== See also ==
- Trade unions in Switzerland
