= Mendrisio railway station =

Railway station in Switzerland

Mendrisio
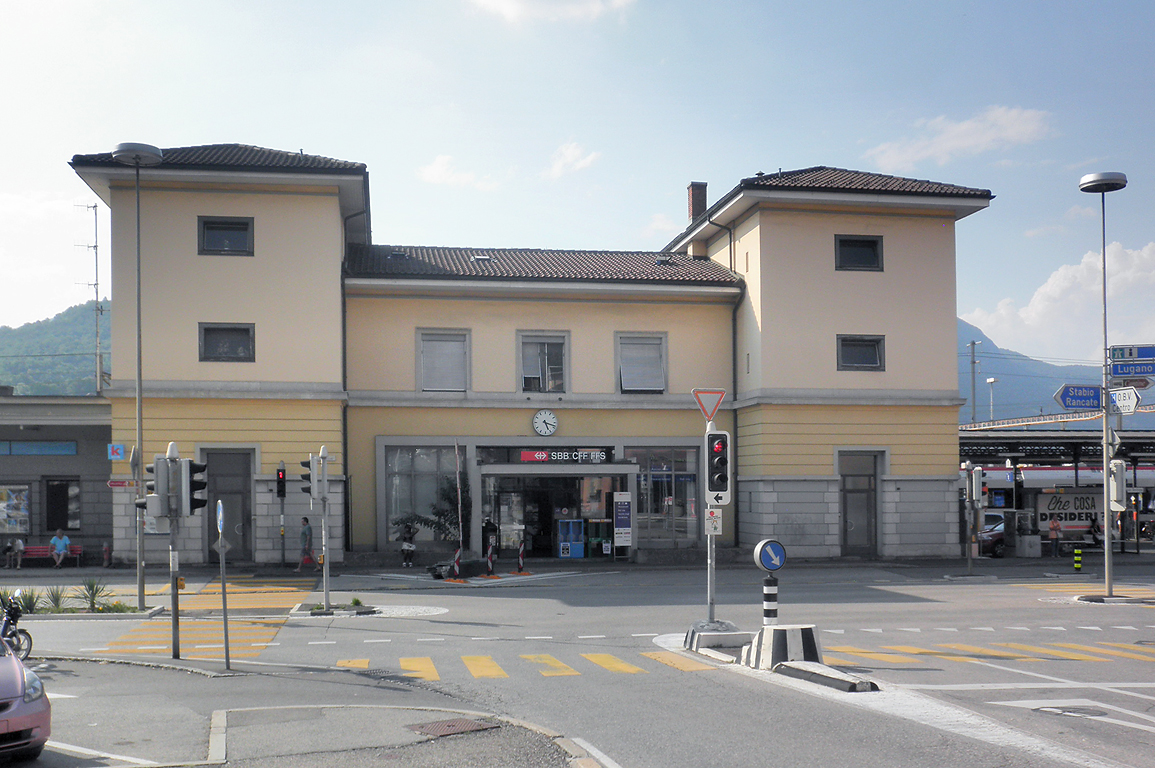
- The station building in 2012

General information
- Location: Mendrisio; Switzerland
- Coordinates: 45°52′09″N 8°58′43″E
- Elevation: 328 m (1,076 ft)
- Owner: Swiss Federal Railways
- Lines: Gotthard line; Mendrisio–Varese line
- Distance: 198.7 km (123.5 mi) from Immensee
- Train operators: Treni Regionali Ticino Lombardia
- Connections: Autopostale and local buses

Other information
- Fare zone: 150 (arcobaleno)

History
- Opened: 6 December 1874
- Electrified: 6 February 1922

Passengers
- 2018: 8,000 per weekday

Services
Preceding station	TiLo	Following station
Lugano-Paradiso towards Locarno	RE80	Chiasso towards Milano Centrale
Mendrisio San Martino towards Airolo	S10	Balerna towards Como San Giovanni
Mendrisio San Martino towards Airolo	S50	Stabio towards Malpensa Aeroporto Terminal 2
Stabio towards Varese	S40	Balerna towards Como San Giovanni
Mendrisio San Martino towards Giubiasco	S90	Terminus
Location

Mendrisio railway station (Italian: Stazione di Mendrisio) is a railway station in the Swiss canton of Ticino and municipality of Mendrisio. The station is on the Swiss Federal Railways Gotthard railway, between Lugano and Chiasso, and is also the junction for the Mendrisio–Varese line, formerly freight-only, but which was rebuilt as an international connection to Varese.

== Services ==
As of the December 2021 timetable change, the following services stop at Mendrisio:

- RE80: half-hourly service between Locarno and Chiasso and hourly service to Milano Centrale.
- S10 / S40: three trains per hour to Chiasso and half-hourly service to Como San Giovanni.
- S10 / S50: half-hourly service to Biasca.
- S40 / S50: half-hourly service to Varese and hourly service to Malpensa Aeroporto Terminal 2.
- S90: hourly service to Giubiasco.

== See also ==
- Rail transport in Switzerland
