= Treni Regionali Ticino Lombardia =

Commuter rail network in St. Gallen, Switzerland

TILO SA
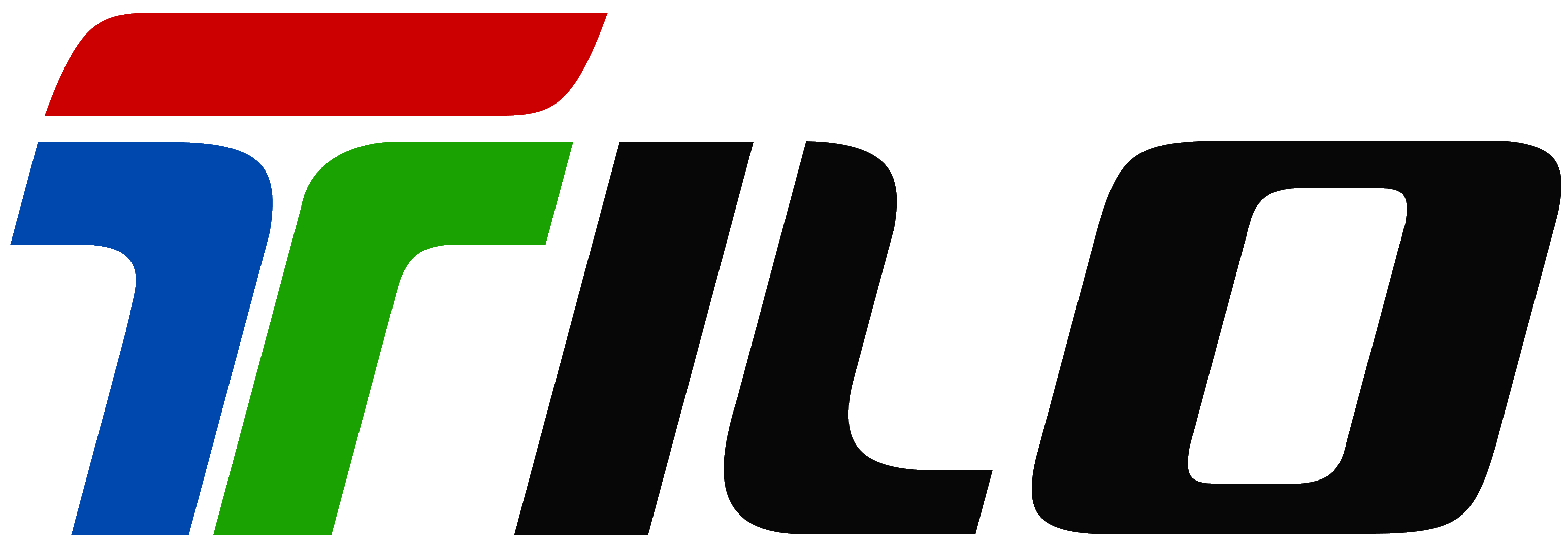

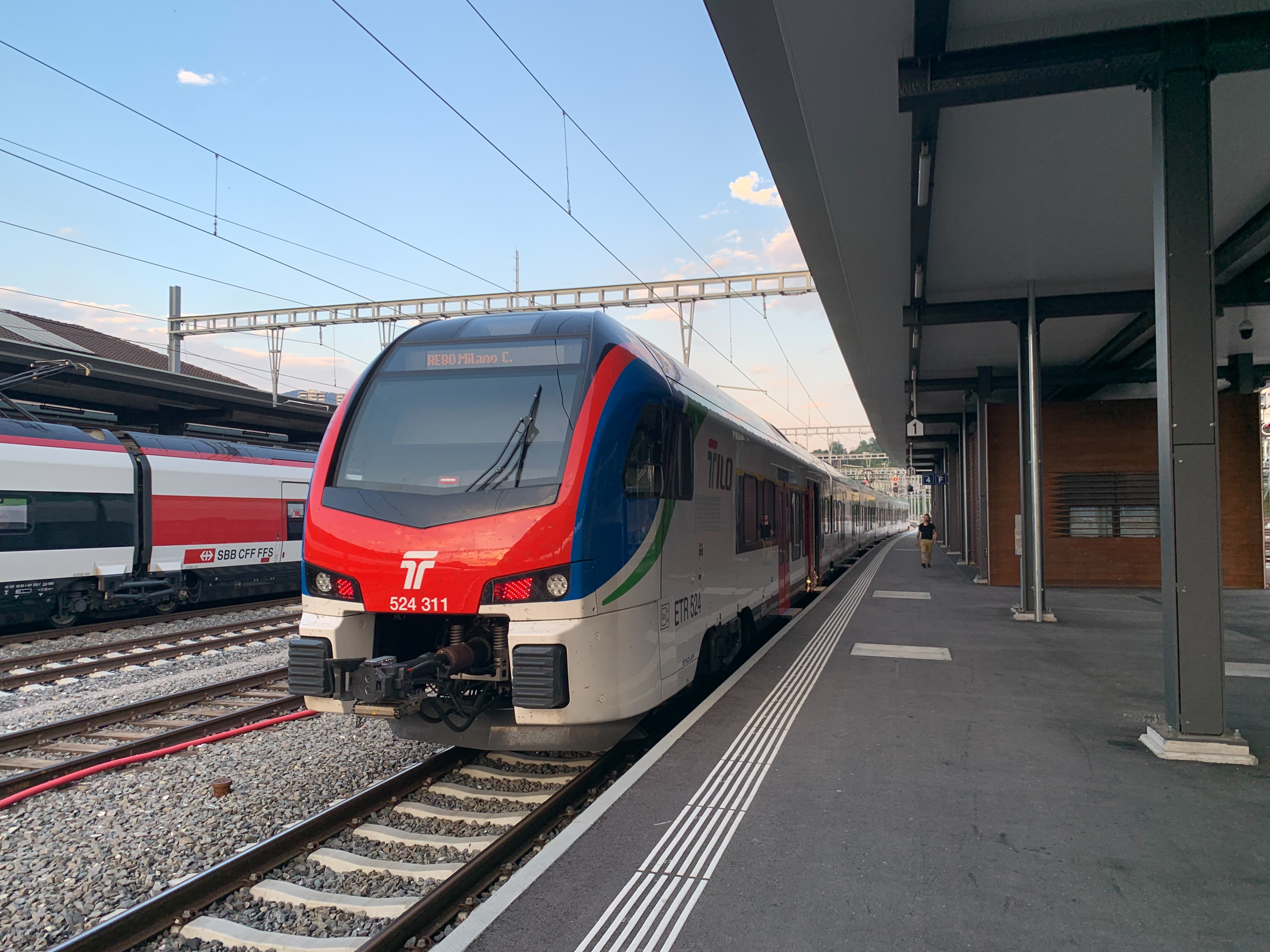
- Stadler Rail RABe 524 of TILO at Chiasso
- Native name: Treni Regionali Ticino Lombardia, TILO
- Type: Joint venture between Trenord and SBB CFF FFS
- Industry: Rail Transport
- Founded: 14 June 2004; 22 years ago
- Headquarters: Bellinzona, Ticino, Switzerland
- Divisions: Passenger
- Website: www.tilo.ch/en/ (in English)

TiLo (Italian: Treni Regionali Ticino Lombardia) is a limited company established in 2004 as a joint venture between Italian railway company Trenord and Swiss Federal Railways (SBB CFF FFS); both companies participate in the equity of TILO SA with participation of 50%. It operates standard gauge regional train services in the Swiss canton of Ticino and the Italian region of Lombardy.

== Overview ==
Former logo of TiLo

The company's goal is to develop the regional cross-border traffic between the canton of Ticino and the Region of Lombardy. In 2009, the company carried 6 million passengers. Most traveled along the Como ↔ Chiasso ↔ Mendrisio ↔ Lugano ↔ Bellinzona ↔ Biasca (S10) and Bellinzona ↔ Locarno routes (S20), served by trains every 30 minutes (every 15 minutes on average at peak times). Line S30 Bellinzona ↔ Luino is served every 2 hours, with a single daily train continuing to Busto Arsizio.

The staff that runs the trains in Italy is supplied by Trenord and by Swiss Federal Railways for the trains running in Switzerland. The trains are always accompanied by a driver only, except for the S10 only in the Italian section Chiasso – Albate, where there is also a conductor accompanying the train.

== Rolling stock ==
The TILO fleet consists of the following trainsets. The Stadler FLIRT trains are equipped to run in both Switzerland and Italy, while the older NPZ trains are used only on peak hours trains in Switzerland.

- 19 RABe 524.0/ETR 150 Stadler FLIRT 4-car EMUs
- 11 RABe 524.1/ETR 524 Stadler FLIRT 6-car EMUs
- Some NPZ RBDe 560 EMUs with NPZ driving trailers and EW 1 or EW 2 intermediate coaches
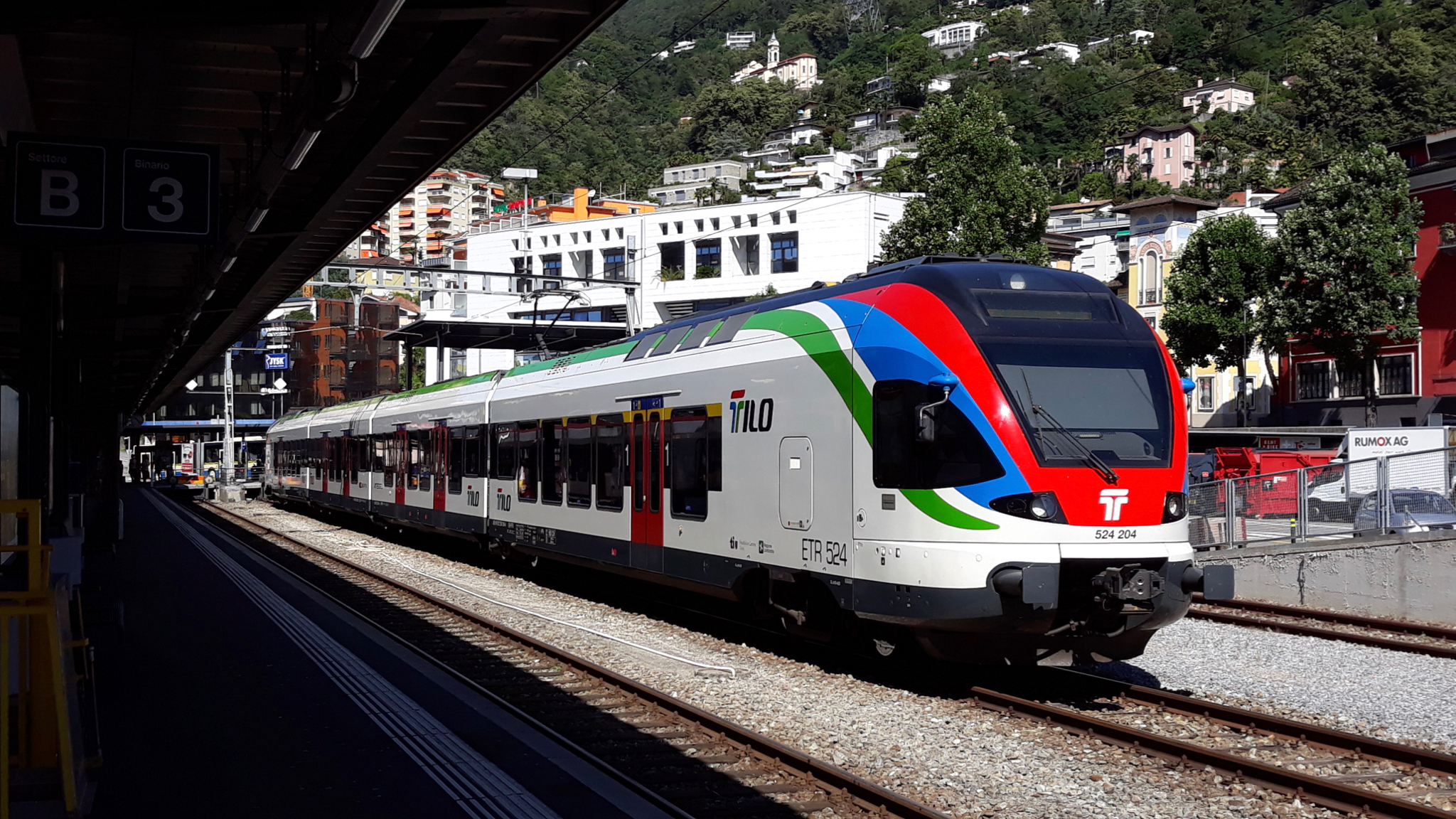
TILO Stadler FLIRT with current livery in Locarno

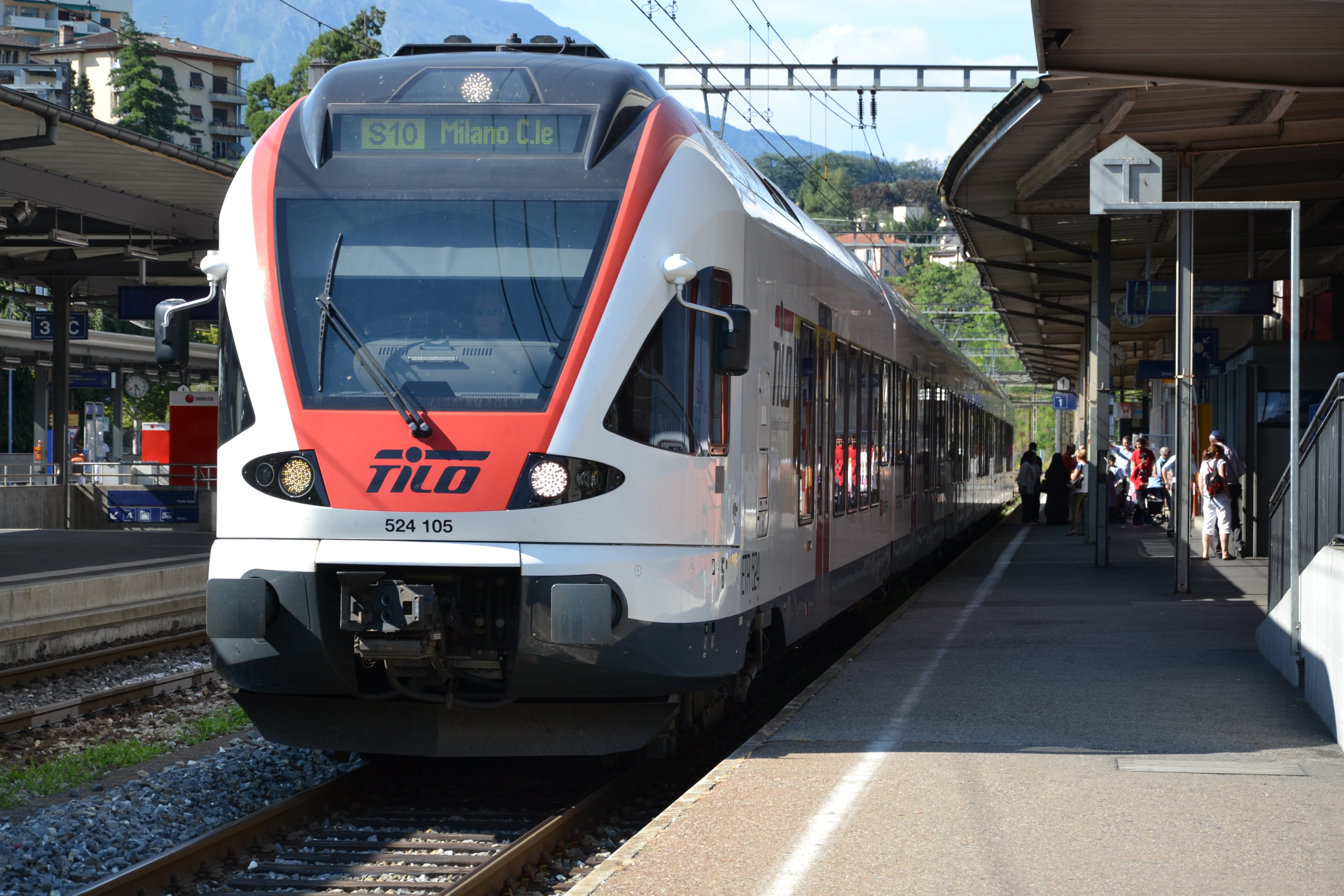
Stadler flirt with previous livery

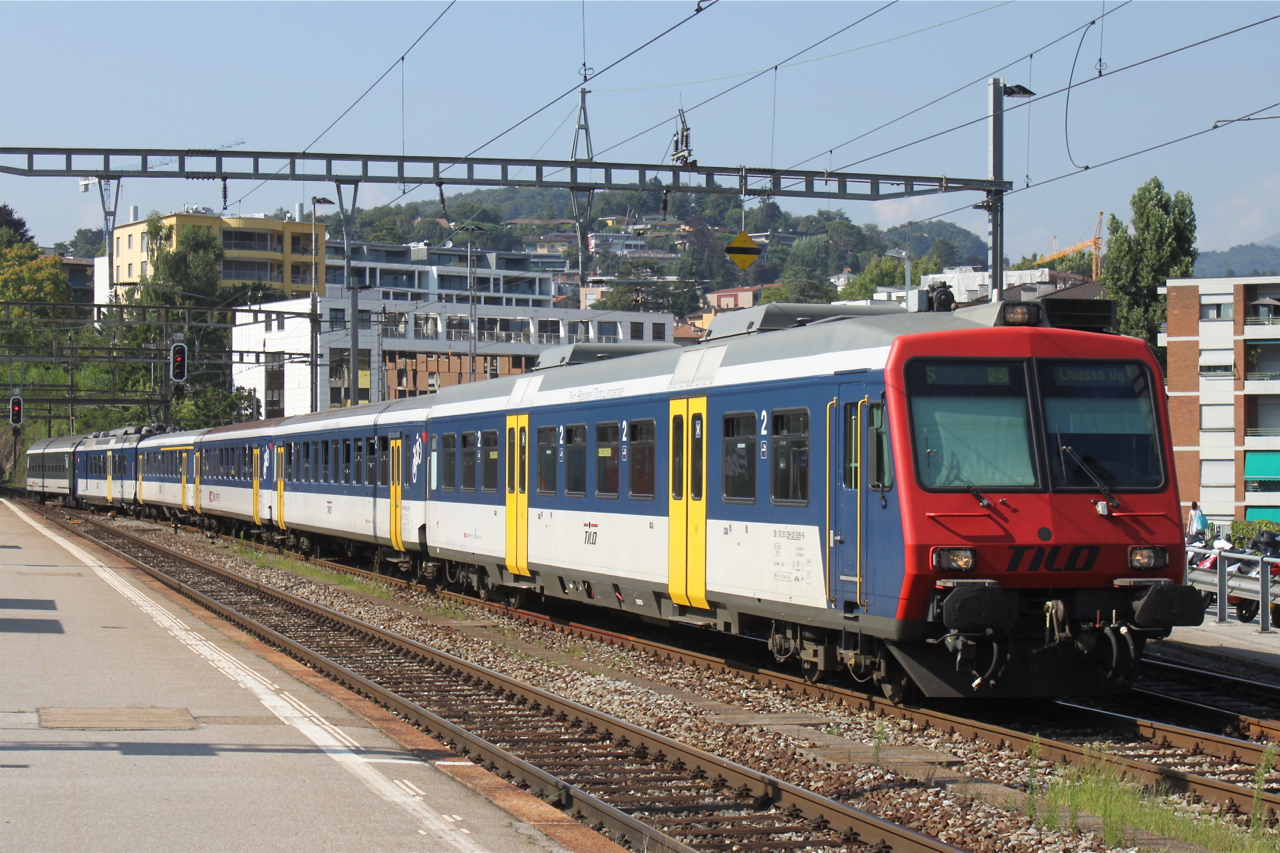
NPZ operating for TILO in 2012

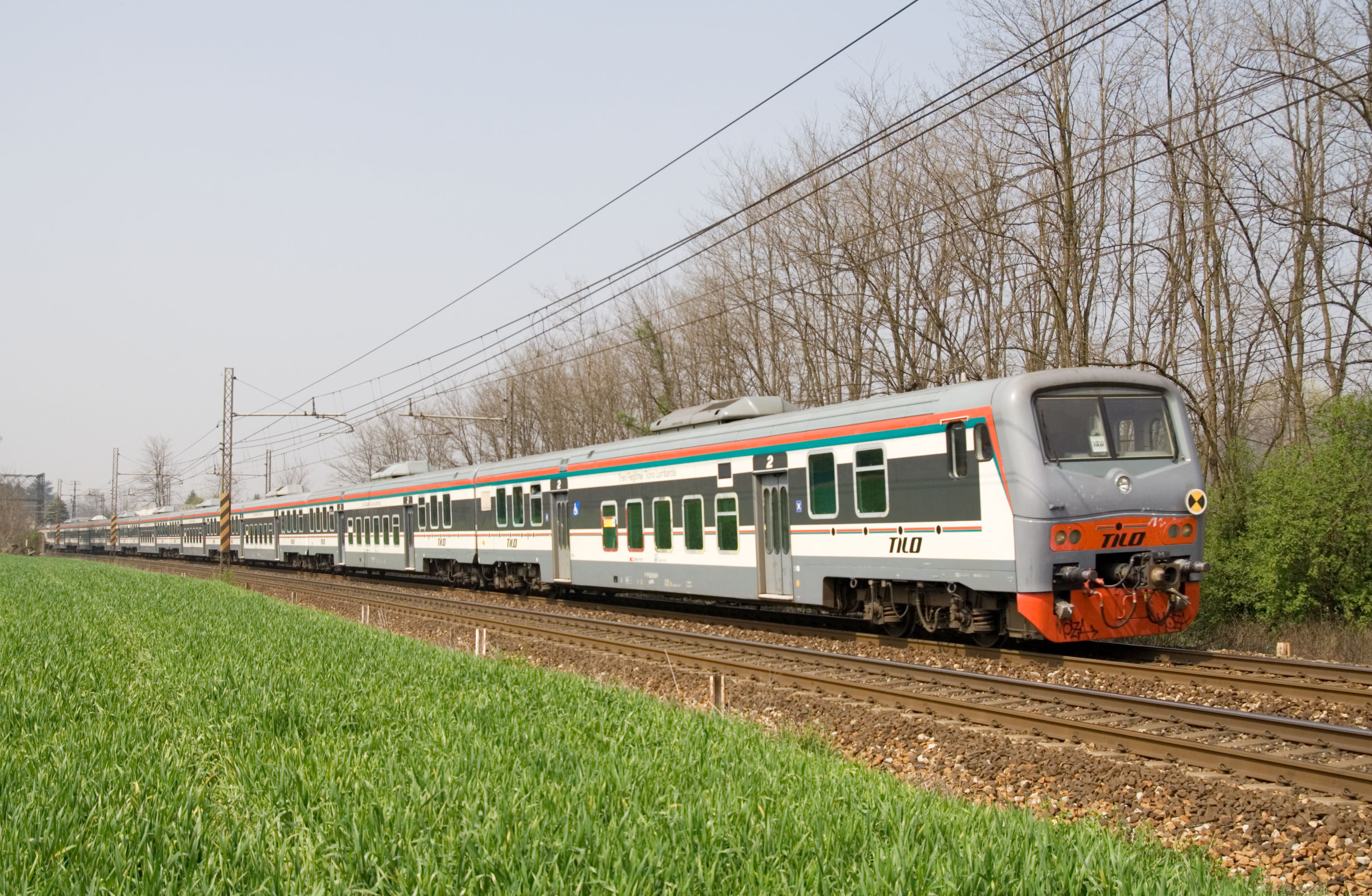
Former push–pull trainset of TILO in 2007, with early livery

== Routes ==
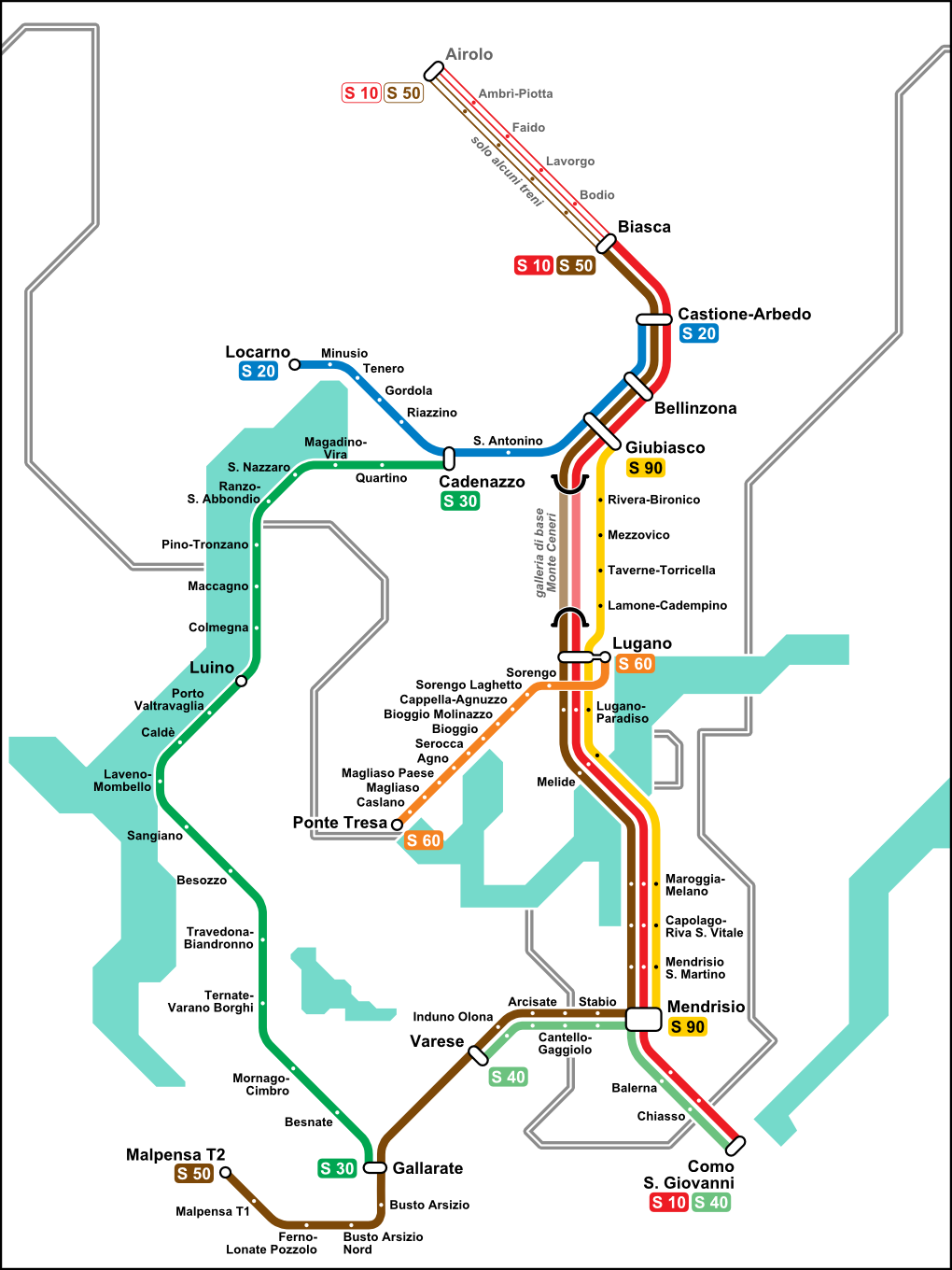
S-Bahn network in Ticino and Lombardy with services of TILO and FLP (S60)

TiLo currently operates S-Bahn lines S10, S20, S30, S40, S50 and S90, as well as the RegioExpress line RE80 between Locarno and Milan. All routes operate across the border in both Italy and Switzerland except the S20 and S90, which serve only stations in Switzerland. TILO is a member of the Arcobaleno tariff network.

Line #	Route	Railway
S10	(Airolo –) Biasca – Bellinzona – Lugano – Chiasso (– Como San Giovanni)	Gotthard Railway, Milan–Chiasso railway
S20	Castione-Arbedo – Bellinzona – Locarno	Gotthard Railway, Giubiasco–Locarno railway
S30	(Bellinzona –) Cadenazzo – Luino (– Gallarate)	Gotthard Railway, Giubiasco–Locarno railway, Cadenazzo–Luino railway, Luino–Milan railway
S40	Varese – Mendrisio – Como San Giovanni	Gotthard Railway, Mendrisio–Varese railway
S50	Malpensa Aeroporto Terminal 2 – Varese – Stabio – Mendrisio – Lugano – Biasca (– Airolo)	Gotthard line, Mendrisio–Varese railway, Porto Ceresio–Milan railway, Domodossola–Milan railway, Saronno–Novara railway, Busto Arsizio–Malpensa railway
S90	Giubiasco – Lugano (– Mendrisio)	Gotthard Railway
RE80	Locarno – Lugano – Chiasso – Milano Centrale	Gotthard Railway, Giubiasco–Locarno railway, Milan–Chiasso railway

Connections in Ticino: At Lugano, TILO services S10, S20 and S50 have connections with the S60 (departing from Lugano FLP) to Ponte Tresa. At Capolago-Riva San Vitale, TILO services S10, S50 and S90 connect with the Monte Generoso railway to Monte Generoso. At Locarno, lines S20 and RE80 connect with the Domodossola–Locarno railway line (trains departing from Locarno FART) to Domodossola.

Connections in Lombardy: At Varese, the S40 and S50 of TILO connect with the S5 (Milan S Lines) to Treviglio and RE5 of Trenord to Porto Ceresio. The S40 and S50 also connect to the R22 and RE1 of Trenord (departing from Varese Nord). At Chiasso/Como San Giovanni, the S10 and S40 of TILO connect with the S11 to Rho.
