= Bellinzona railway station =

Railway station in Switzerland

Bellinzona
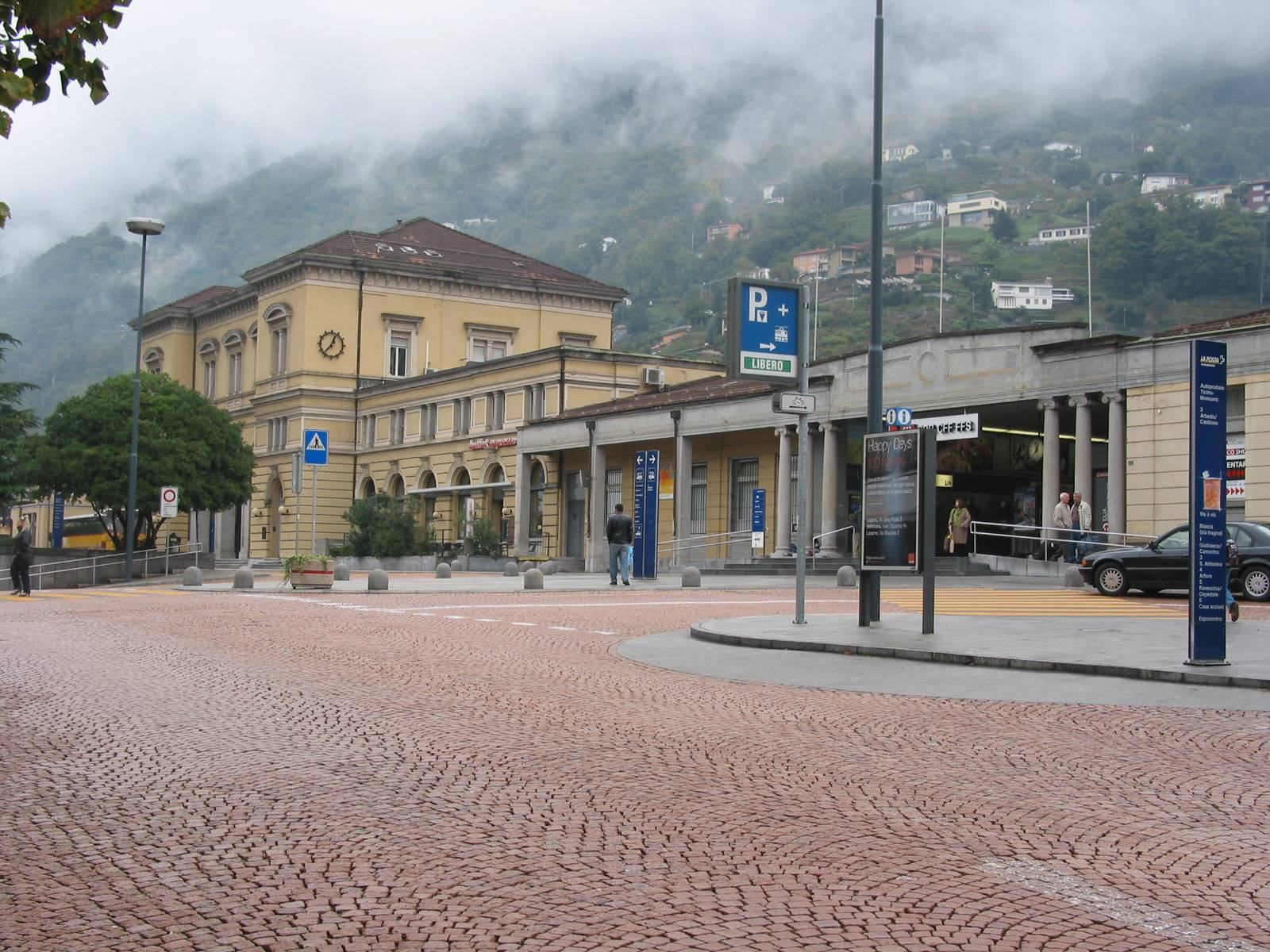
- The station building in 2006

General information
- Location: Viale Stazione 36; Bellinzona; Switzerland
- Coordinates: 46°11′44″N 9°01′46″E
- Elevation: 241 m (791 ft)
- Owner: Swiss Federal Railways
- Line: Gotthard line
- Distance: 150.9 km (93.8 mi) from Immensee
- Platforms: 3
- Tracks: 7
- Train operators: Südostbahn; Swiss Federal Railways; Treni Regionali Ticino Lombardia
- Connections: Autopostale bus services

Other information
- IATA code: ZDI
- Fare zone: 20/200 (Arcobaleno)

History
- Opened: 6 December 1874
- Electrified: 29 May 1921

Passengers
- 2025: 20,700 per day (SBB, SOB)
- Rank: 36 out of 1,095

Services
Preceding station	SBB CFF FFS	Following station
Arth-Goldau towards Frankfurt (Main) Hbf	EuroCity	Lugano towards Milano Centrale
Arth-Goldau towards Zürich HB	EuroCity	Lugano towards Bologna Centrale, Genova Piazza Principe, Milano Centrale or Venezia Santa Lucia
Arth-Goldau towards Zürich HB	IC 2	Lugano Terminus
Altdorf towards Basel SBB	IC 21	Lugano Terminus
Preceding station	Südostbahn	Following station
Castione-Arbedo towards Basel SBB	IR 26	Giubiasco towards Locarno
Castione-Arbedo towards Zürich HB	IR 46	Giubiasco towards Locarno
Preceding station	TiLo	Following station
Castione-Arbedo towards Airolo	S10	Giubiasco towards Como San Giovanni
Castione-Arbedo towards Airolo	S50	Giubiasco towards Malpensa Aeroporto Terminal 2
Castione-Arbedo Terminus	S20	Giubiasco towards Locarno
Location
- Location within Switzerland Location within Canton of Ticino

Bellinzona railway station (Italian: Stazione di Bellinzona) serves the town of Bellinzona, in the canton of Ticino, Switzerland. It is on the Swiss Federal Railways' Gotthard line. The station is nicknamed Porta del Ticino ("Gate of Ticino") since the opening of the Gotthard Base Tunnel in 2016.

== History ==
In 1872, the construction of the Gotthard Railway began from Chiasso to Locarno, then to Bellinzona, where the station was opened in 1874. The construction continued up the Ticino valley (Ticino valley railway) to Biasca and then to Bodio. In 1882, upon the opening of the Gotthard Rail Tunnel, and the related commencement of services on the line between Biasca and Airolo, Bellinzona was connected with the north, and with German-speaking Switzerland.

In 2008, the SBB Cargo facility at Bellinzona hit the headlines, when its workers went on strike, after SBB Cargo had prescribed rigorous reduction measures for the site.

With the opening of the Gotthard Base Tunnel in 2016, travel times from Lucerne to Bellinzona fell by 45 minutes. The opening of the Ceneri Base Tunnel in December 2020 reduced travel times from Bellinzona to Lugano by 15 minutes.

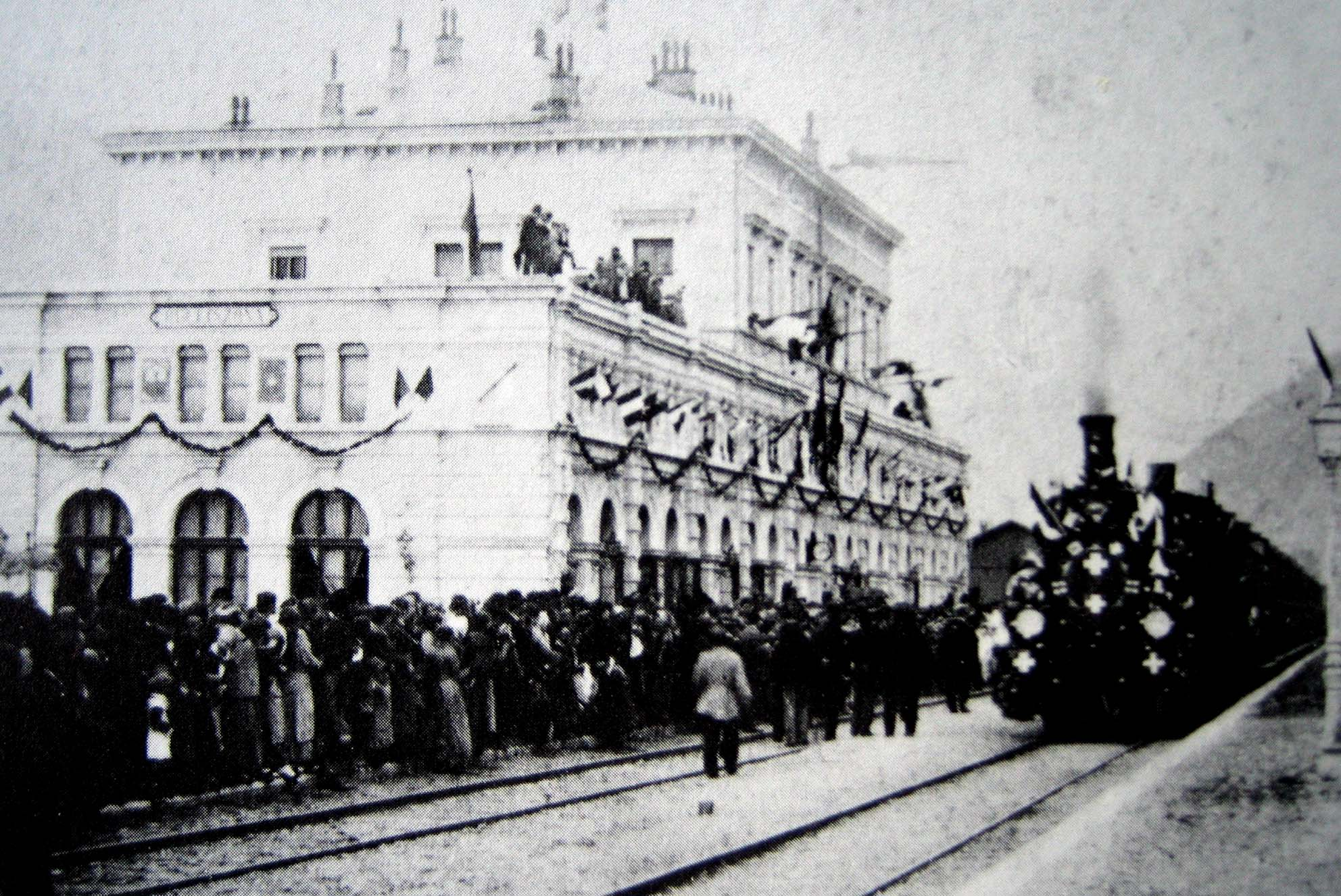
The station at the opening of the Gotthard line in 1882

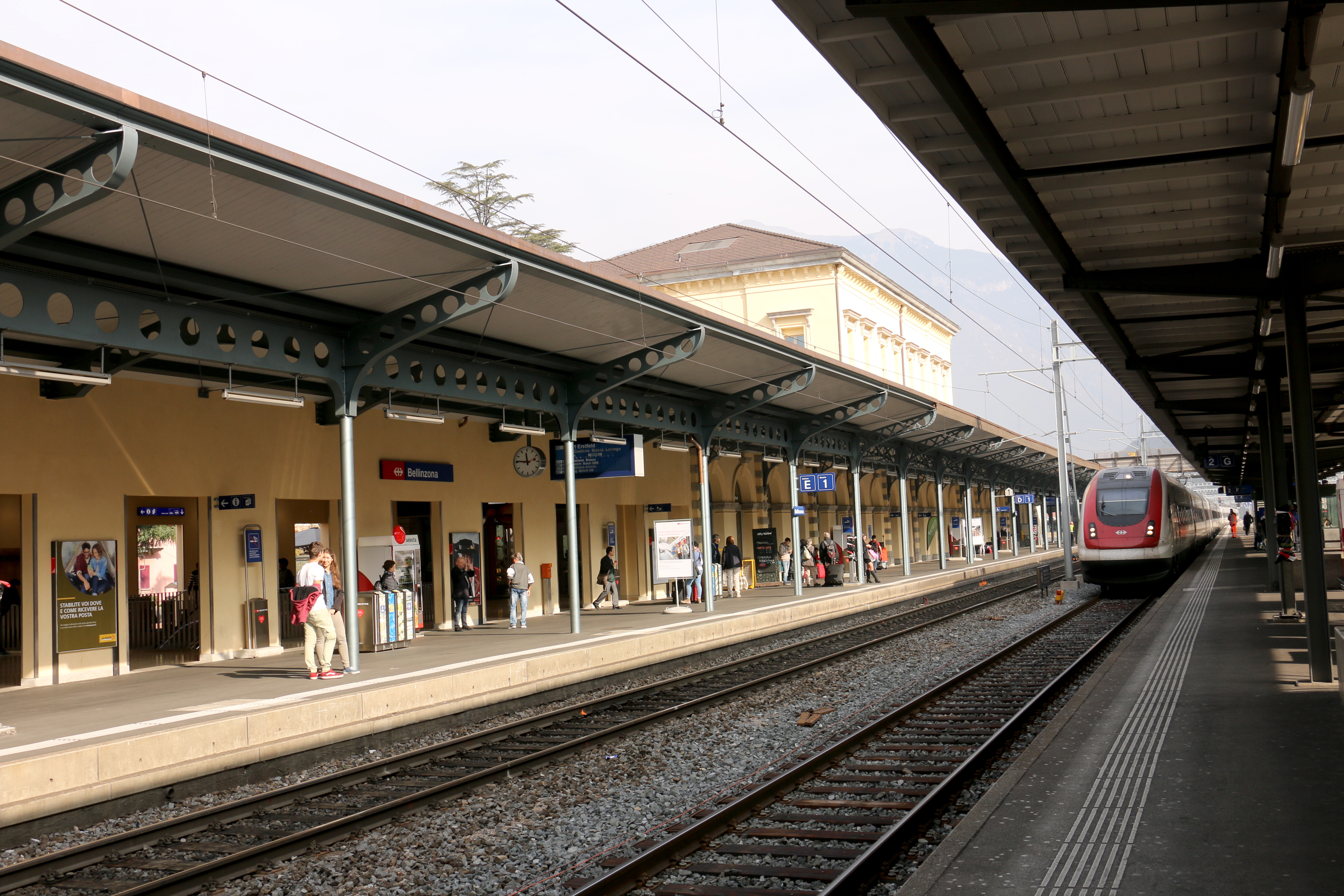
2017 Arriving train on the same track as in 1882

== Facilities ==
The station has five through platform tracks, served by a side platform and two island platforms, connected by both a pedestrian subway and a footbridge. There are also transit and overtaking tracks for goods trains.

The station building is on the side platform, and is flanked at each end of the station by two terminal platform tracks; the terminal track to the south is in occasional use by terminating passenger trains, but the one to the north is normally used to stable the Bellinzona tunnel rescue train.

== Services ==
Passenger traffic at the station is handled by the Südostbahn and Swiss Federal Railways, which serve the station with long-distance trains, and by Treni Regionali Ticino Lombardia (TiLo), which operates various local and regional trains.

As of the December 2021 timetable change, the following services stop at Bellinzona:

- EuroCity / InterCity: half-hourly service between Arth-Goldau and Lugano; hourly service to Bologna Centrale, Genova Piazza Principe, Milano Centrale, Milano Porta Garibaldi, or Venezia Santa Lucia; hourly to half-hourly service to Zürich Hauptbahnhof; and service every two hours to Basel SBB.
- InterRegio: hourly service between Locarno and Arth-Goldau; trains continue to Basel SBB or Zürich Hauptbahnhof.
- S10 / S50: half-hourly service between Biasca and Mendrisio and hourly service to Chiasso, Como San Giovanni, or Malpensa Aeroporto Terminal 2. One train per day continues to Airolo.
- S20: half-hourly service between Castione-Arbedo and Locarno.
- Gotthard Panorama Express: daily tourist oriented service via the original high level Gotthard tunnel, with connecting boat service on Lake Lucerne to Lucerne.

Regional bus routes of the Autopostale terminate on the station forecourt, providing links to various destinations. Autopostale also operates Bellinzona's city bus network, and all city services call at the station.

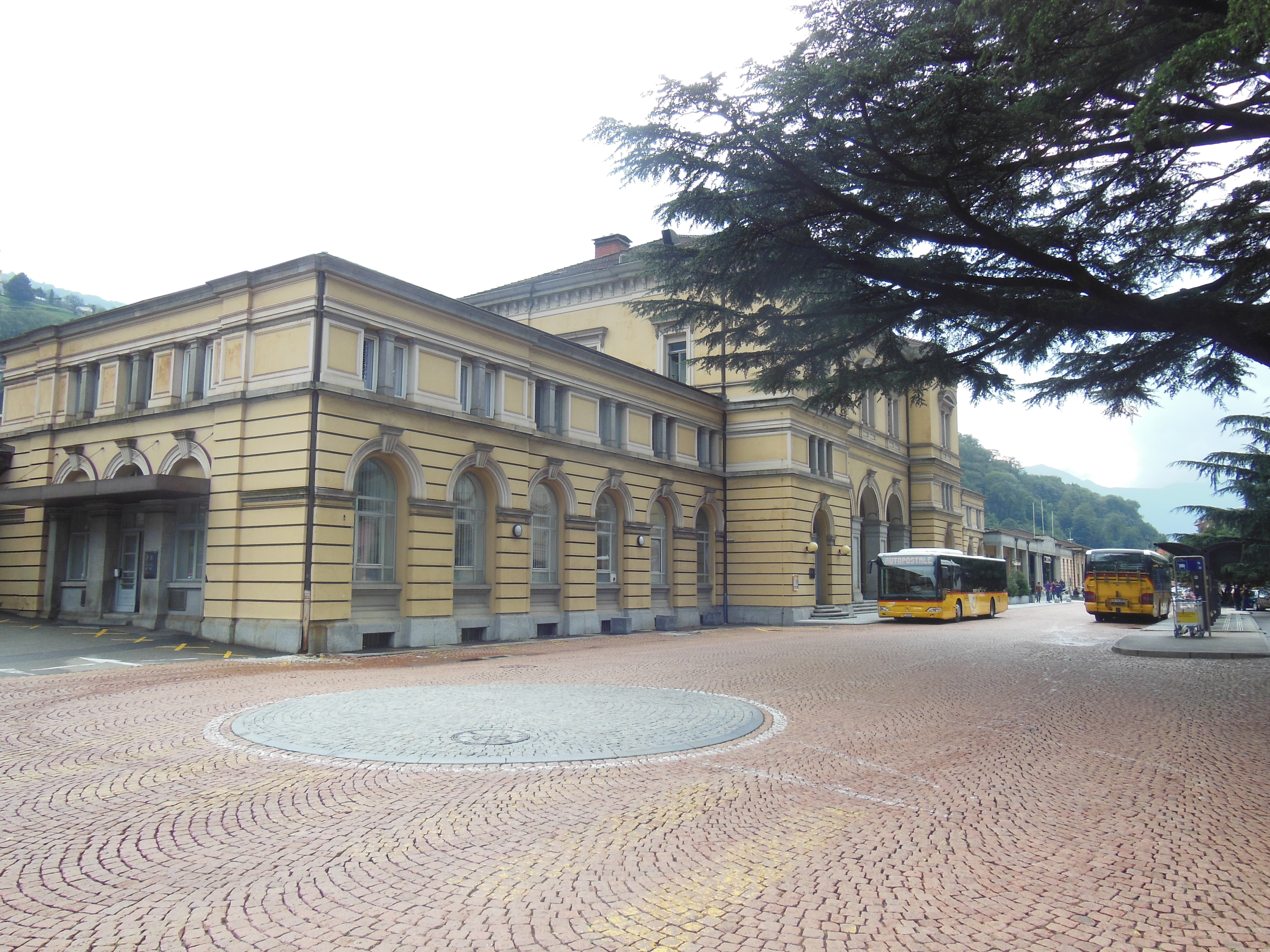
Station building with regional bus stops

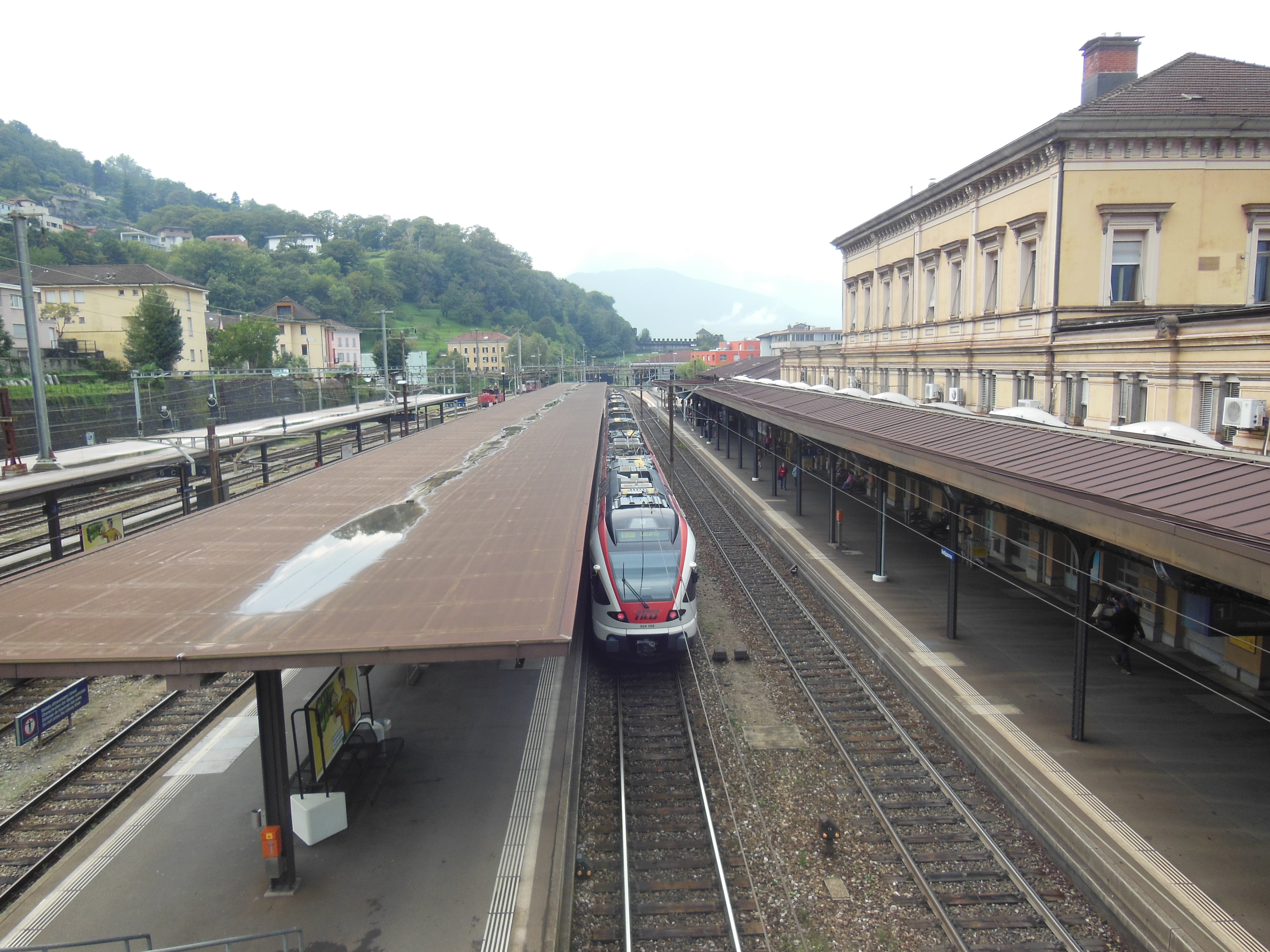
Station building and platforms from the footbridge, looking south

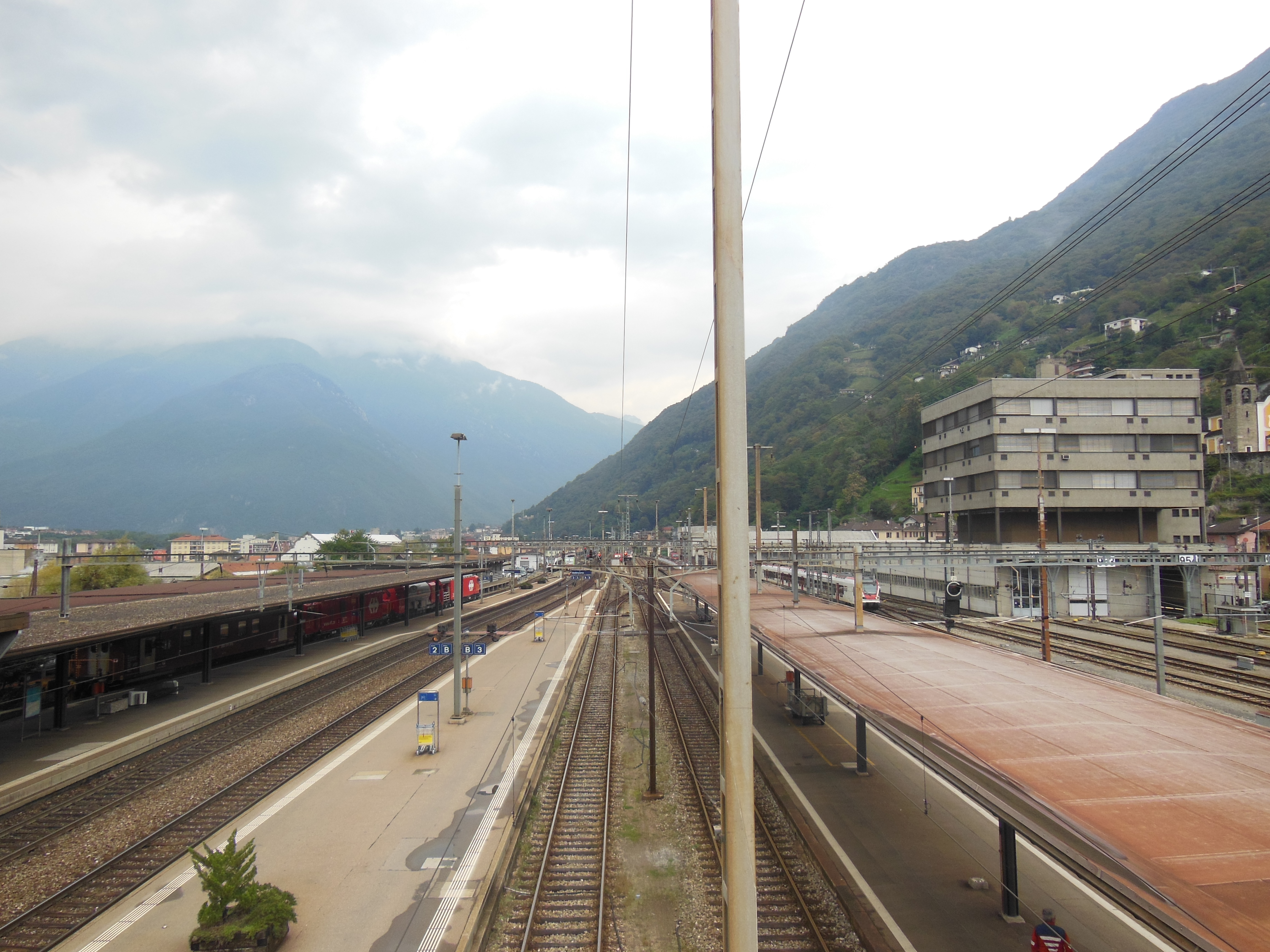
Station platforms and railway works from the footbridge, looking north

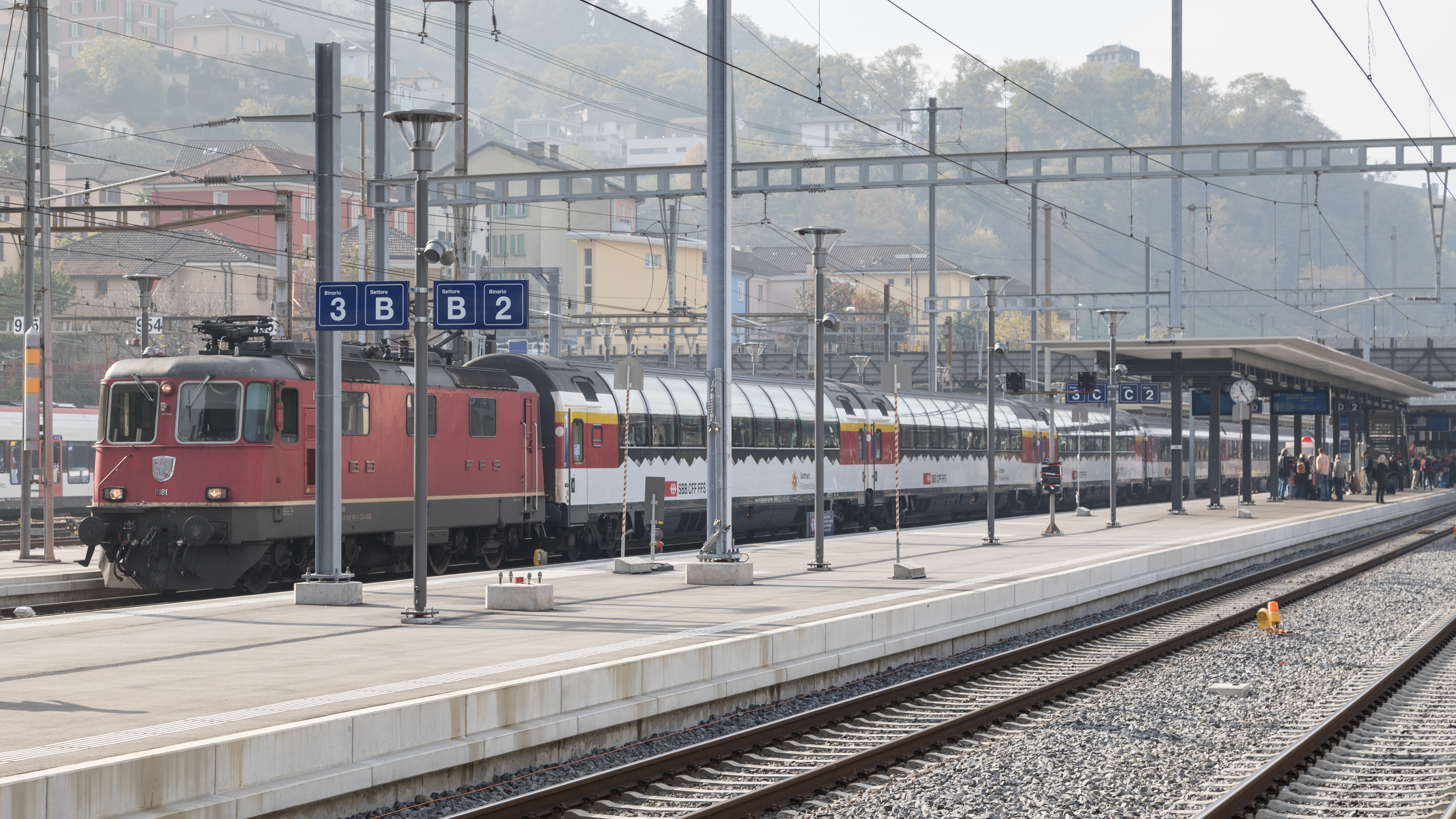
Gotthard Panorama Express trainset

== See also ==
- NRLA
- Bellinzona railway workers strike of 2008
- Gotthardbahn
- Rail transport in Switzerland
