= S10 (TILO) =

Biasca–Como Camerlata
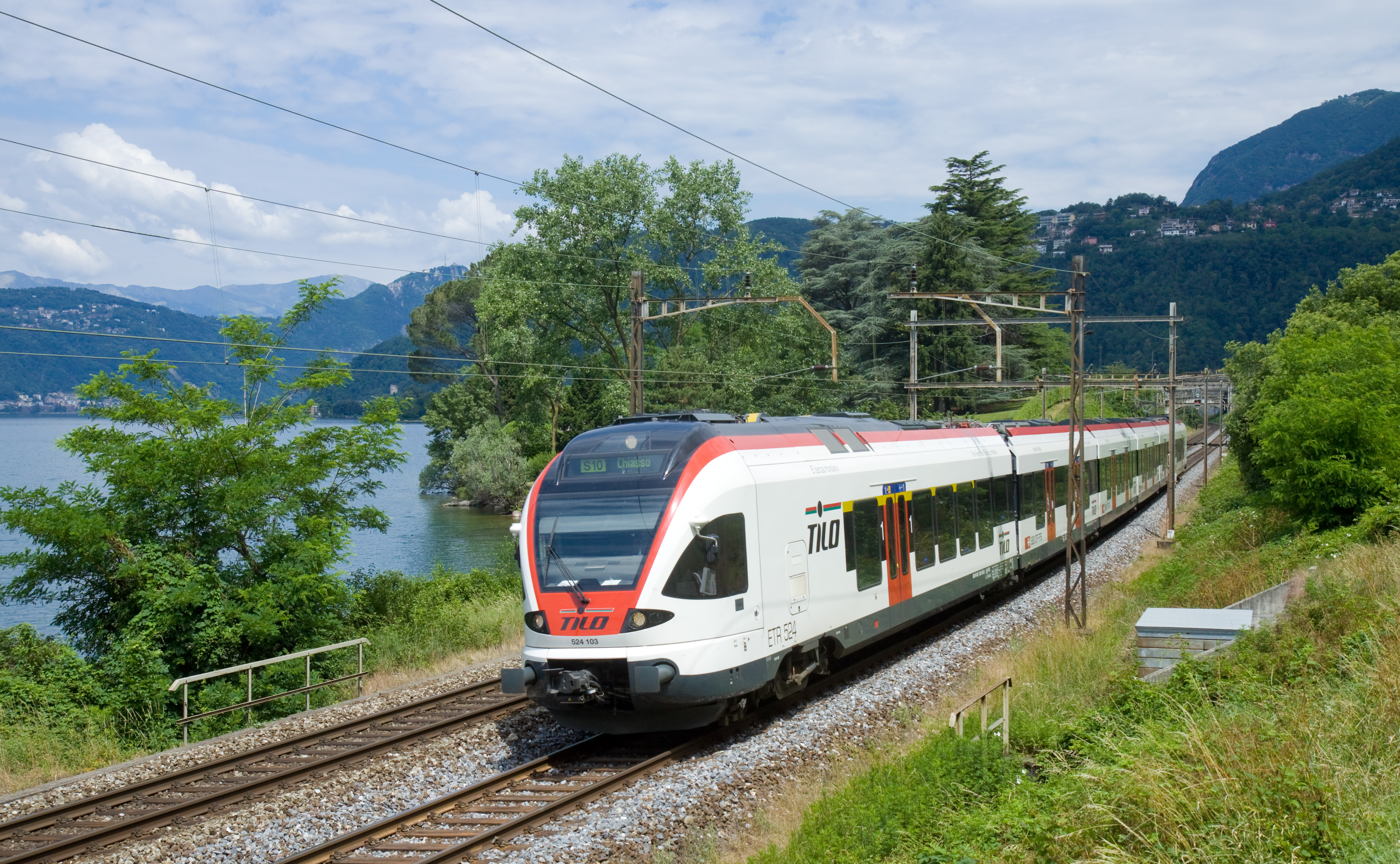
- An S10 running between Capolago and Maroggia-Melano in 2011

Overview
- First service: 2004
- Current operator: Treni Regionali Ticino Lombardia

Route
- Termini: Biasca; Como Camerlata
- Average journey time: 1 hour 15 minutes (Biasca–Chiasso); 1 hour 30 minutes (Biasca–Como Camerlata)
- Service frequency: 30 minutes (Biasca–Como San Giovanni); 60 minutes (Biasca–Como Camerlata)
- Lines used: Gotthard line; Milan–Chiasso line

The S10 is a railway service that runs every half-hour between Biasca and Chiasso in the Swiss canton of Ticino. Every other train is extended from Chiasso to Como San Giovanni, in Italy. Treni Regionali Ticino Lombardia (TILO), a joint venture of Swiss Federal Railways and Trenord, operates the service.

== Operations ==
The S10 runs every half hour from Biasca to Chiasso, using the Gotthard line. The S10 uses the Ceneri Base Tunnel between Giubiasco and Lugano, bypassing the traditional Gotthard route. South of Chiasso, every other train continues to Como San Giovanni in Italy, providing hourly service between there and Biasca. The S10 and S50 operate as a single train between Biasca and Mendrisio.

== History ==
The S10 was introduced in 2004 as a regular service between Bellinzona and Chiasso, eventually with a 30-minute frequency. The Between December 2008 and December 2013 the southern terminus was extended to Albate-Camerlata, in Italy. It was again extended Albate-Camerlata in December 2015, and then cut back to Como San Giovanni in September 2018.

The opening of the Ceneri Base Tunnel transformed regional services in Ticino. On 5 April 2021, the S10 and S50 began using the tunnel and bypassing all local stops between Giubiasco and Lugano. The northern terminus moved from Bellinzona to Biasca.
