= Chiasso railway station =

Railway station in Chiasso, Switzerland

Chiasso
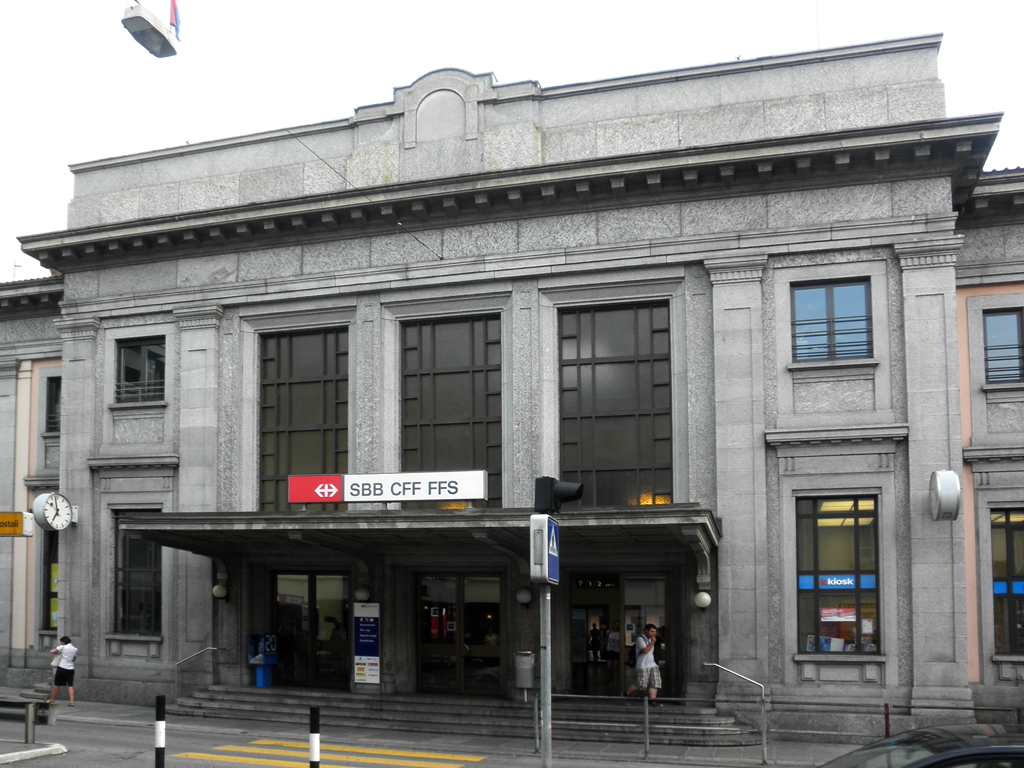
- The station entrance in 2012

General information
- Location: Via Giuseppe Motta; Chiasso; Switzerland
- Coordinates: 45°49′56″N 9°01′53″E
- Elevation: 237 m (778 ft)
- Owner: Swiss Federal Railways
- Lines: Gotthard line; Milan–Chiasso line
- Distance: 206.2 km (128.1 mi) from Immensee
- Platforms: 5
- Tracks: 9
- Train operators: Swiss Federal Railways; Treni Regionali Ticino Lombardia; Trenord
- Connections: Autopostale and local buses

Other information
- Fare zone: 15/150 (Arcobaleno)

History
- Opened: 6 December 1874
- Electrified: 6 February 1922 (Swiss part); 1939 (Italian part)

Passengers
- 2016: 6,300 per working day
- Rank: 100 of 1735

Services
Preceding station	SBB CFF FFS	Following station
Lugano towards Frankfurt (Main) Hbf	EuroCity	Como San Giovanni towards Milano Centrale
Lugano towards Zürich HB	EuroCity	Como San Giovanni towards Bologna Centrale, Genova Piazza Principe, Milano Centrale or Venezia Santa Lucia
Preceding station	TiLo	Following station
Mendrisio towards Locarno	RE80	Como San Giovanni towards Milano Centrale
Balerna towards Airolo	S10	Como San Giovanni Terminus
Balerna towards Varese	S40	Como San Giovanni Terminus
Preceding station	Trenord	Following station
Terminus	Line S11 (Milan suburban railway service)	Como San Giovanni towards Rho
Location

Chiasso railway station (Italian: Stazione di Chiasso) is a station owned by the Swiss Federal Railways (SBB CFF FFS). It serves the town of Chiasso, in the canton of Ticino, Switzerland, and is also a border station between Switzerland and Italy.

The station is both the southern terminus of the Gotthard railway (owned and operated by SBB CFF FFS), and the northern terminus of the Milan–Chiasso railway (owned by Rete Ferroviaria Italiana and operated by Trenitalia). It is situated a few metres from the border, with the eastern section of Platform 1 being located on Italian territory, and is separated from the Italian city of Como by twin railway tunnels through the Monte Olimpino.

== Train movements ==
Given its location, Chiasso is an important station, not only for the connection between Italy and Switzerland, but also for that between northern and southern Europe. The station is served by the long-distance trains that cross the Gotthard, together with S10 and S40 of the Ticino regional network, and line S11 of the Milan suburban service.

In 2009, there was a reduction in the numbers of train services to the station, which led to the reduction in the numbers of certain jobs. Thanks to numerous complaints raised by various sectors of the political and institutional elements of Ticino, Swiss-Italian EuroCity services returned to Chiasso. The opening of the Ceneri Base Tunnel in December 2020 reduced travel times from Chiasso to Bellinzona by 20 minutes and led to an increase in EuroCity services to Milano.

As of the December 2021 timetable change, the following trains stop at Chiasso:

- EuroCity:
  - ten trains per day between Zürich Hauptbahnhof and Bologna Centrale, Genova Piazza Principe, Milano Centrale, or Venezia Santa Lucia;.
  - two trains per day between Basel SBB and Milano Centrale or Milano Porta Garibaldi.
- RE80: half-hourly service to Locarno and hourly service to Milano Centrale.
- S10: half-hourly service to Biasca and hourly service to Como San Giovanni.
- S11: hourly service to Milano Porta Garibaldi.
- S40: hourly service between Varese and Como San Giovanni.

== Border procedures ==
As an international border station, Chiasso acts as a transmission facility between the Italian and Swiss networks. The traction voltages, motors and signalling systems of the two networks are different, and therefore trains passing through the station must change locomotives. The yard tracks are also required to be divided into two parts, connected to the station's central platform by a corridor, where there are also customs offices. Thus, trains for the Italian network start at separate tracks compared to the Swiss network.

With the entry of Switzerland into the Schengen Agreement, passport controls have officially been abolished. However, in practice, the Italian Guardia di Finanza and the Swiss Border Guard may still perform border checks on selected trains, both in Chiasso station and aboard trains.

=== Customs ===
Chiasso remains, for customs purposes, a border station for passengers arriving from Italy. Customs checks may be performed in the station by Swiss officials.

== See also ==
- Rail transport in Switzerland
