= Mendrisio–Varese railway =

Railway line in Switzerland and Italy

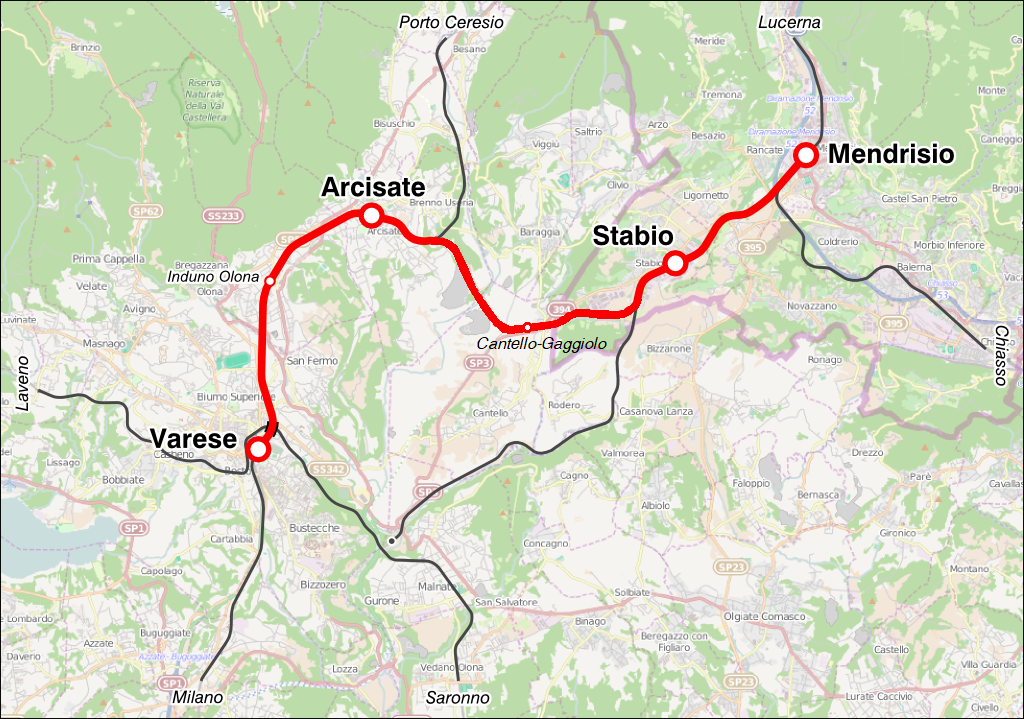

Overview
- Status: in use
- Owner: Rete Ferroviaria Italiana; Swiss Federal Railways
- Locale: Ticino, Switzerland; Lombardy, Italy
- Termini: Mendrisio; Varese

History
- Opened: June 28, 1926

Technical
- Line length: 17.607 km (10.940 mi)
- Number of tracks: 1
- Track gauge: 1,435 mm (4 ft 8 1/2 in) standard gauge
- Electrification: 15 kV AC 16.7 Hz (Switzerland); 3000 V DC (Italy)

The Mendrisio–Varese railway is a railway line in southern Ticino, Switzerland, and northern Lombardy, Italy. It connects the towns of Mendrisio and Varese, crossing the Italy–Switzerland border.

== History ==
It was opened in 1926 as part of the international Valmorea railway, but only two years later the border crossing was closed by the Italian government, which didn't agree with a privately owned international connection (the Italian section of the line was operated by Ferrovie Nord Milano).

The Swiss section remained active, but lost passenger service and was from then used only as a freight railway for the industries around Stabio.

Since 1993 the line is also used by touristic trains on the re-opened line to Malnate.

A new branch, the Arcisate–Stabio railway, was recently constructed, connecting Varese to Mendrisio, and therefore to Lugano and Como. The 3,5 km section between Mendrisio and Stabio reopened to passenger trains in December 2014, the rest of the line in January 2018.
