= Malpensa Aeroporto Terminal 2 railway station =

Railway station in Italy

Malpensa Aeroporto T2
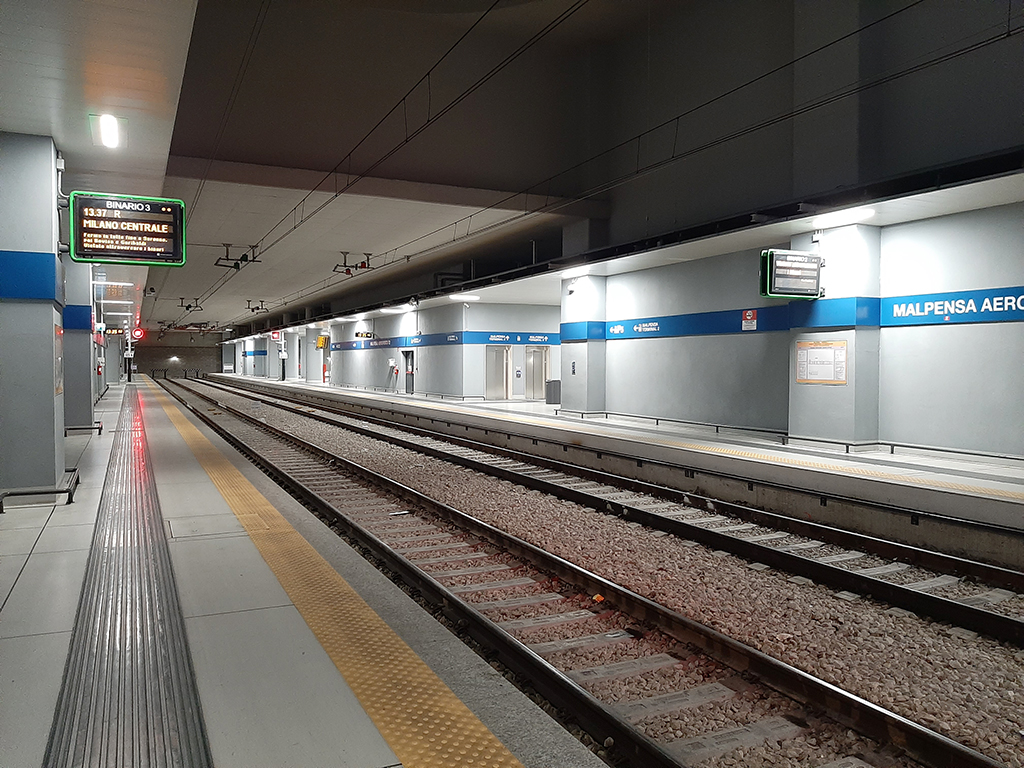
- The station platforms in 2019

General information
- Location: Milan-Malpensa Airport; Italy
- Coordinates: 45°39′N 8°43′E
- Owner: Ferrovienord
- Line: Busto Arsizio–Malpensa line
- Platforms: 2
- Tracks: 2
- Train operators: Trenord; Treni Regionali Ticino Lombardia

History
- Opened: 6 December 2016

Services
Preceding station	Trenord	Following station
Terminus	Malpensa Express Milano Cadorna	Malpensa Aeroporto Terminal 1 towards Milano Centrale or Milano Cadorna
Terminus	Malpensa Express Milano Centrale	Malpensa Aeroporto Terminal 1 towards Milano Centrale or Milano Cadorna
Preceding station	TiLo	Following station
Terminus	S50	Malpensa Aeroporto Terminal 1 towards Bellinzona
Location
- Location within Lombardy Location within Northern Italy Location within Italy

Malpensa Aeroporto Terminal 2 is a railway station serving Terminal 2 of Milan-Malpensa Airport. It opened in 2016 with the 3.4 kilometer railway extension from the Terminal 1 railway station, thus becoming the western terminus of the Busto Arsizio–Malpensa Airport railway, managed by Ferrovienord.

== Train services ==
The train services are operated by Trenord and TILO and run on a clock-face schedule:

- Trenord Malpensa Express: Malpensa Airport T2-Malpensa Airport T1-Saronno-Milan Cadorna/Milan Centrale, with quarter-hourly frequency (2 trains per hour to Cadorna, 2 to Centrale)
- TILO S50: Malpensa Airport T2-Malpensa Airport T1-Gallarate-Varese-Mendrisio-Lugano-Bellinzona, with hourly frequency
