= San Nicolao railway station =

Railway station in Switzerland

San Nicolao
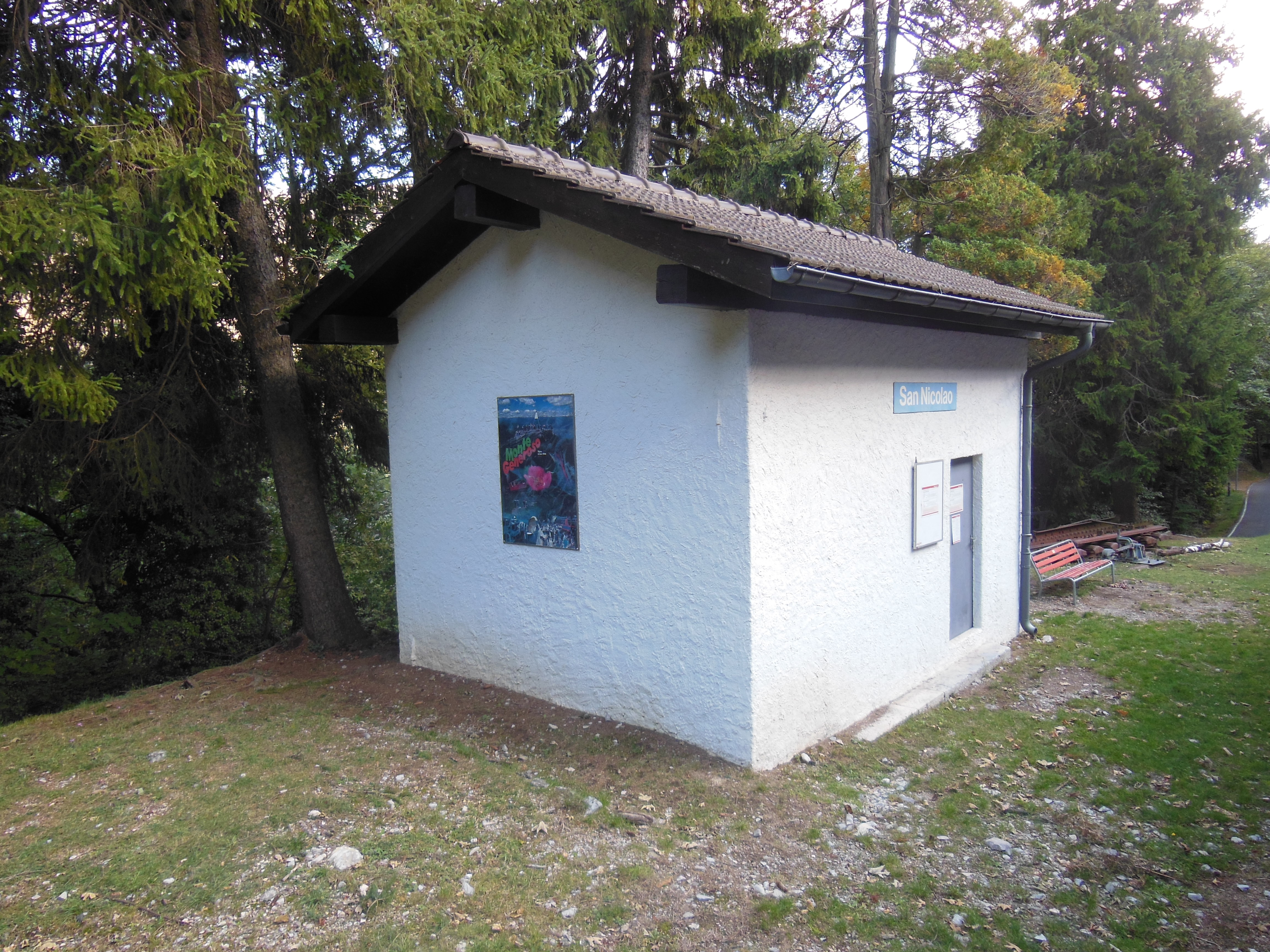

General information
- Location: San Nicolao; Mendrisio, Ticino; Switzerland
- Coordinates: 45.886782°N 8.988726°E
- Elevation: 707 m (2,320 ft)
- Line: Monte Generoso railway
Location
- Location within Switzerland

San Nicolao is a railway station on the Monte Generoso railway, a rack railway that connects Capolago with the summit of Monte Generoso in the Swiss canton of Ticino. The station has a passing loop and a small shelter.

The station is served by the following passenger trains:

Operator	Train Type	Route	Typical Frequency	Notes
Monte Generoso railway		Capolago Lago - Capolago-Riva San Vitale - San Nicolao - Bellavista - Generoso Vetta	9 per day; hourly	Operates in summer only; only 1 train per day between Capolago Lago and Capolago-Riva San Vitale
