= Capolago Lago railway station =

Railway station in Switzerland

Capolago Lago
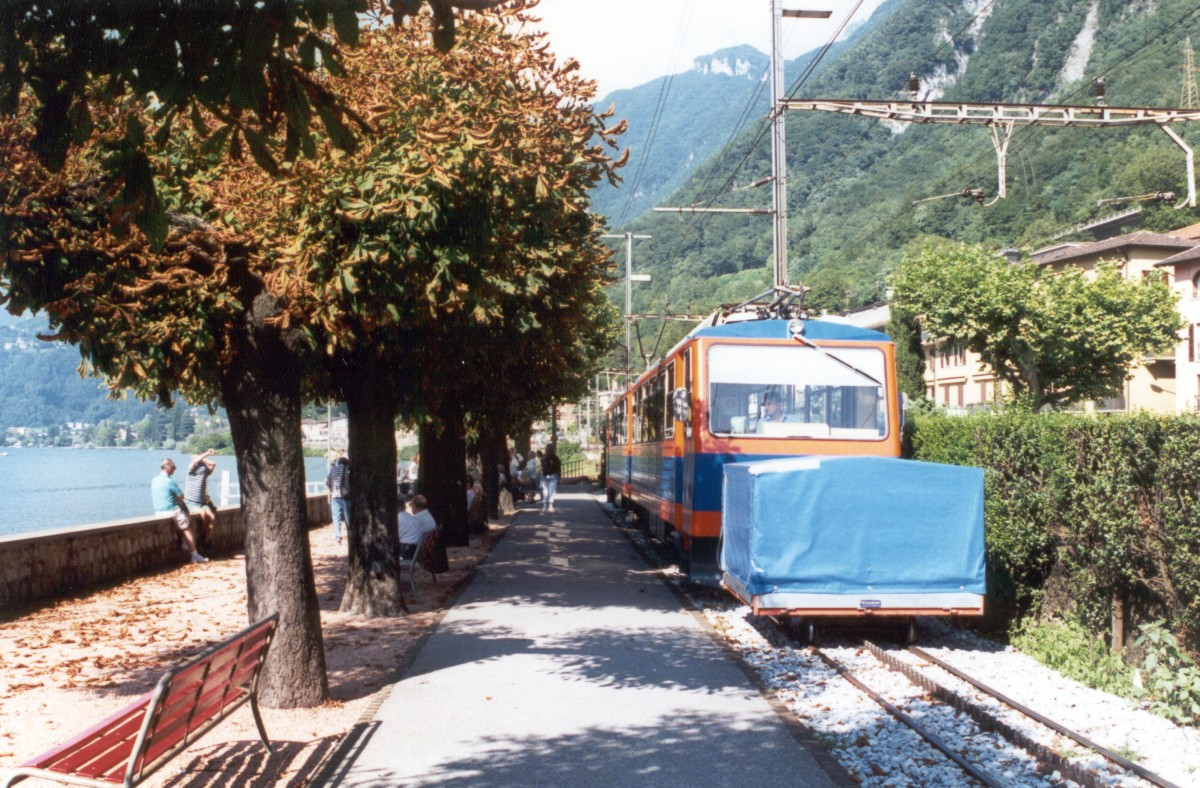

General information
- Location: Capolago Lago; Capolago, Ticino; Switzerland
- Coordinates: 45.9060°N 8.9808°E
- Line: Monte Generoso railway
- Connections: SNL to/from Lugano
Location
- Location within Switzerland

Capolago Lago is an infrequently served railway station on the Monte Generoso railway, a rack railway that connects Capolago with the summit of Monte Generoso in the Swiss canton of Ticino. The station is the lower terminus of the line, and provides interchange with ships of the Società Navigazione del Lago di Lugano at an immediately adjacent jetty on Lake Lugano.

The station is only served to coincide with the arrival of a ship from Lugano; most trains start some 300 m (980 ft) further up the line at Capolago-Riva San Vitale station. It is served by the following trains:

Operator	Train Type	Route	Typical Frequency	Notes
Monte Generoso railway		Capolago Lago - Capolago-Riva San Vitale - San Nicolao - Bellavista - Generoso Vetta	1 per day	Operates in summer only; most trains start from Capolago-Riva San Vitale
