= Capolago-Riva San Vitale railway station =

Railway station in Switzerland

Capolago-Riva San Vitale
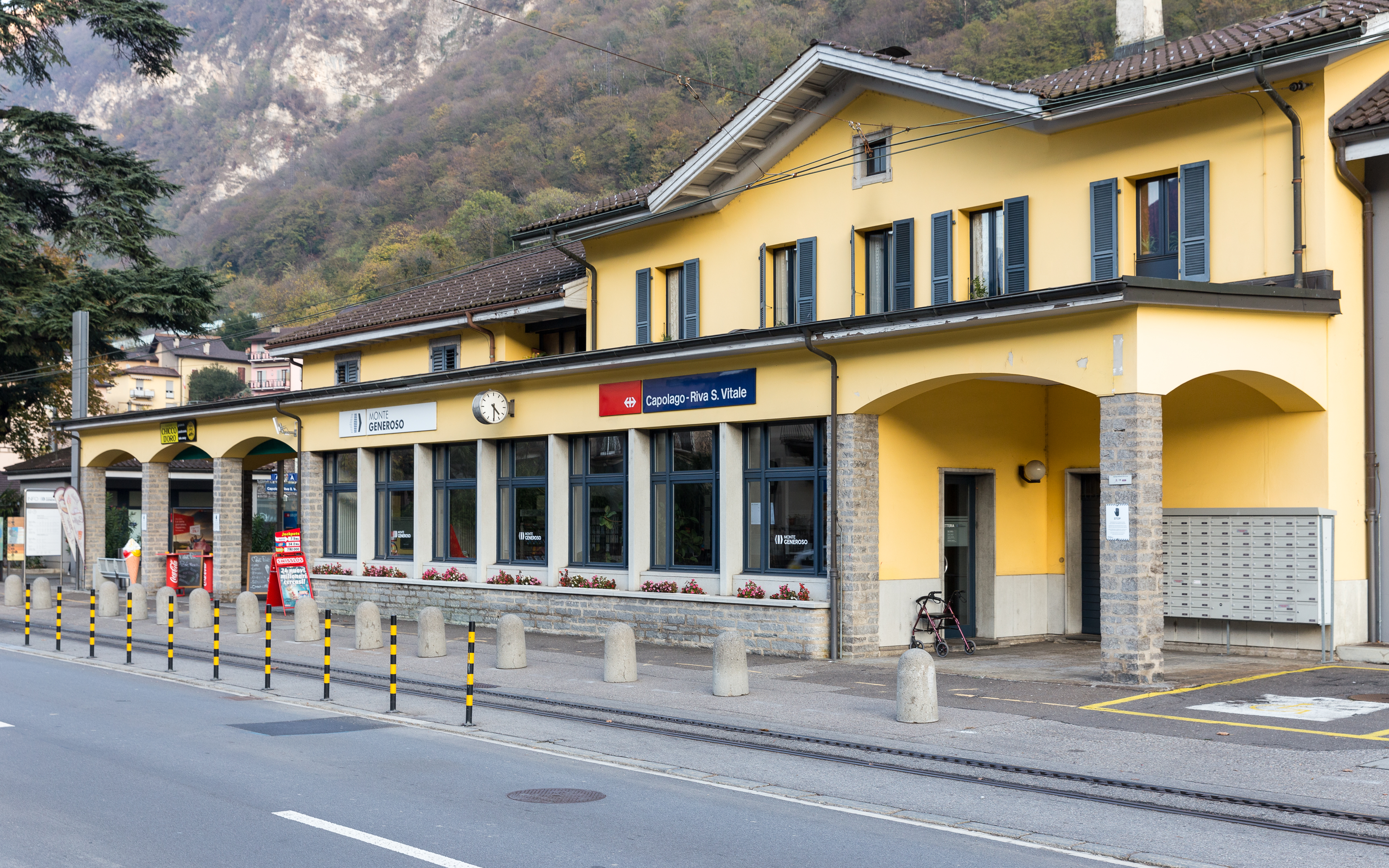
- The station in 2017

General information
- Location: Str. Nuova; Capolago; Switzerland
- Coordinates: 45°54′10″N 8°58′44″E
- Elevation: 274 m (899 ft)
- Owner: Swiss Federal Railways
- Lines: Gotthard line; Monte Generoso line
- Distance: 194.6 km (120.9 mi) from Immensee
- Platforms: 4
- Train operators: Ferrovia Monte Generoso; Treni Regionali Ticino Lombardia
- Connections: Autopostale

History
- Opened: 6 December 1874
- Electrified: 6 February 1922

Services
Preceding station	TiLo	Following station
Maroggia-Melano towards Airolo	S10	Mendrisio San Martino towards Como San Giovanni
Maroggia-Melano towards Airolo	S50	Mendrisio San Martino towards Malpensa Aeroporto Terminal 2
Maroggia-Melano towards Giubiasco	S90	Mendrisio San Martino towards Mendrisio
Preceding station	Ferrovia Monte Generoso	Following station
Capolago Lago Terminus	Monte Generoso line	San Nicolao towards Generoso Vetta
Location

Capolago-Riva San Vitale railway station (Italian: Stazione di Capolago-Riva San Vitale) is a railway station in the Swiss canton of Ticino. The station is in the village of Capolago, part of the municipality of Mendrisio, but, as its name suggests, also serves the adjoining municipality of Riva San Vitale. The station is on the Swiss Federal Railways' Gotthard railway, between Lugano and Chiasso, and on the Monte Generoso railway, a rack railway to the summit of Monte Generoso.

The station features three platforms on the Gotthardbahn, whilst the Monte Generoso trains stop at a streetside location in front of the station. The single track to Monte Generoso leaves the station to the south, immediately climbing to a flyover over the main line, and also continues to the north serving the railway's car shed, workshops, and lakeside terminal stop. Until 1948, the street outside the station contained not only the 800 mm (2 ft 7 1/2 in) gauge tracks of the Monte Generoso railway, but also the 1,000 mm (3 ft 3 3/8 in) gauge tracks of the Mendrisio electric tramway, which linked Chiasso with Riva San Vitale via Mendrisio and Capolago.

== Services ==
As of the December 2021 timetable change, the following services stop at Capolago-Riva San Vitale:

- S10 / S50: half-hourly service between Biasca and Mendrisio and hourly service to Chiasso, Como San Giovanni, or Malpensa Aeroporto Terminal 2.
- S90: hourly service between Giubiasco and Mendrisio.
- Monte Generoso line (April–November): one train per day to Capolago Lago and eight trains per day to Generoso Vetta.

AutoPostale buses serve stops outside the station, providing links to Arogno, Brusino Arsizio, Melano, Mendrisio, Porto Ceresio, Riva San Vitale and Rovio.

== Gallery ==
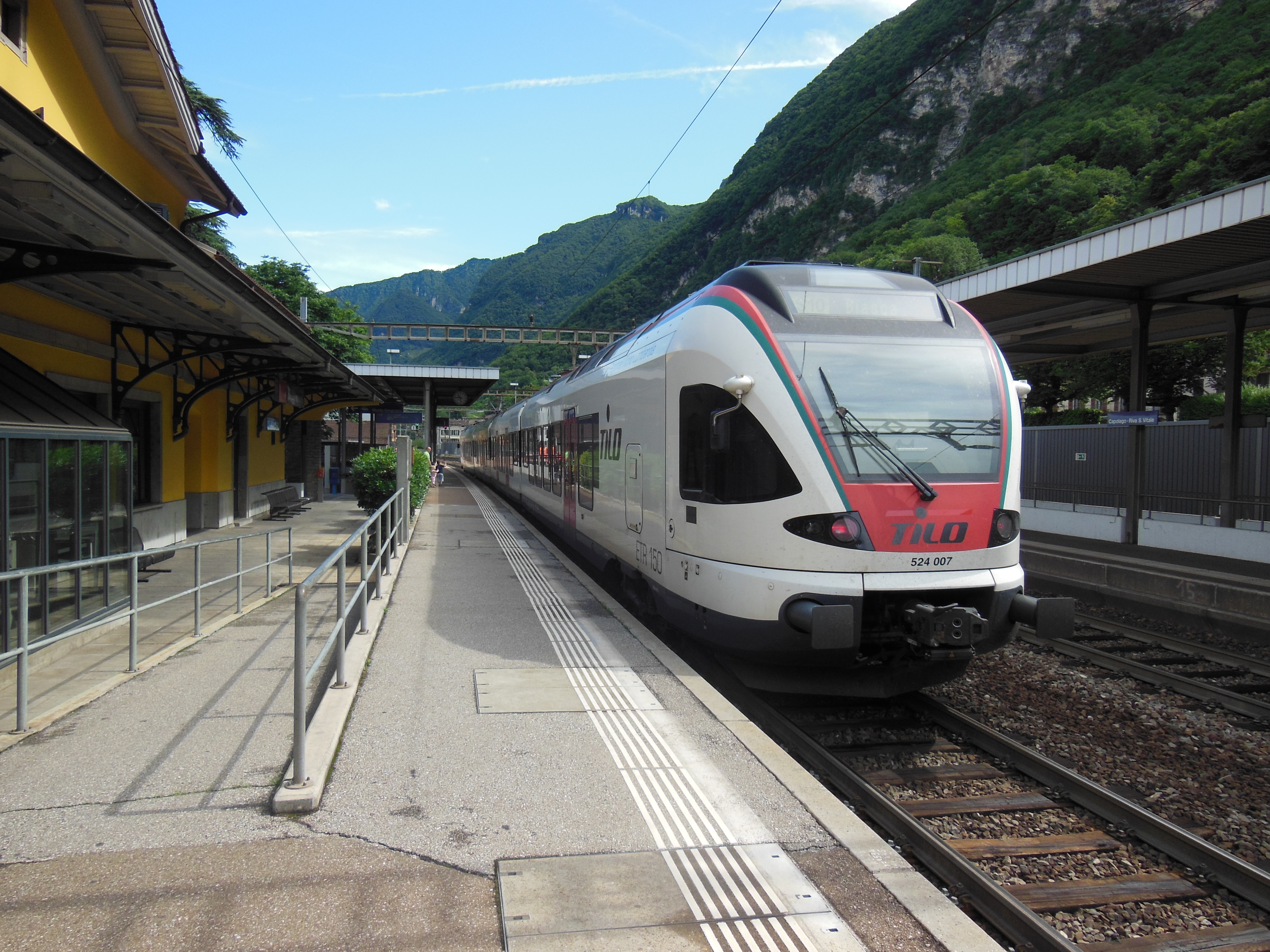
S10 train in main line platform

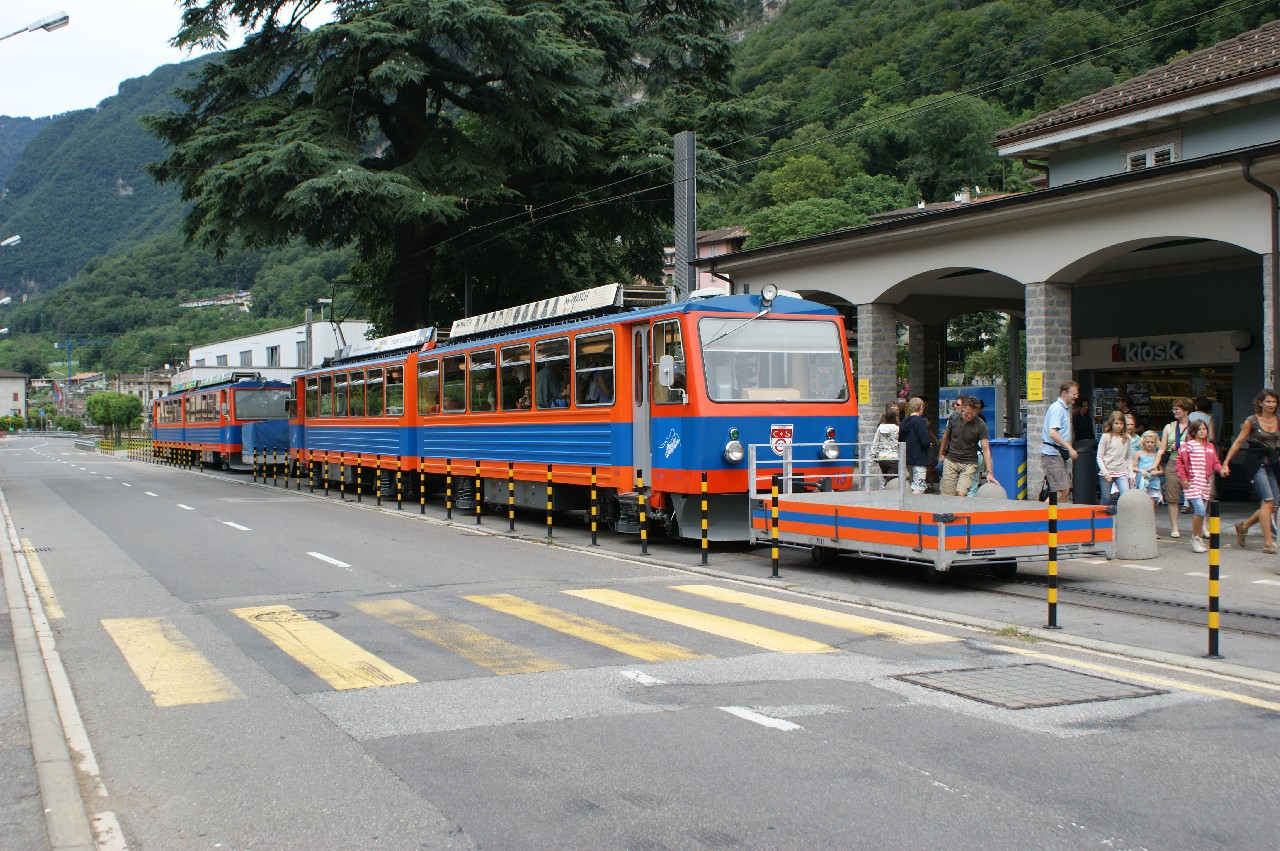
Monte Generoso trains at their stop in front of the station
