= Vouziers-Buzancy railway =

Railway line in France

Coordinates: 49.39925°N 4.70552°E

Vouziers–Buzancy
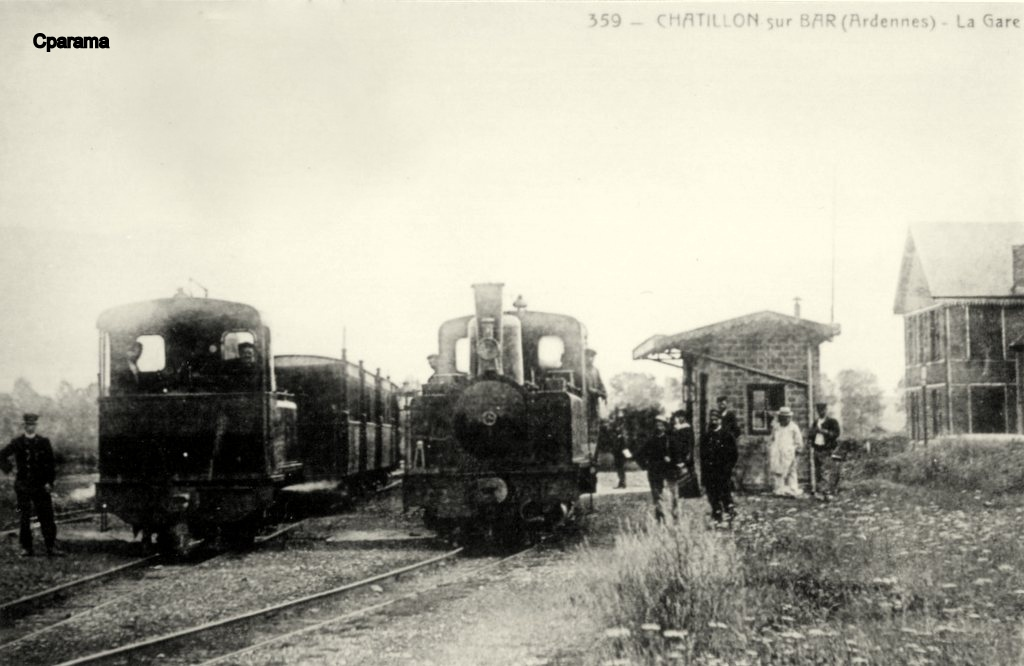
- Châtillon-sur-Bar train station

Technical
- Line length: 24 km (15 mi)
- Track gauge: Until 1923: 800 mm (2 ft 7 1/2 in) after 1923: 1,000 mm (3 ft 3 3/8 in)
Route map
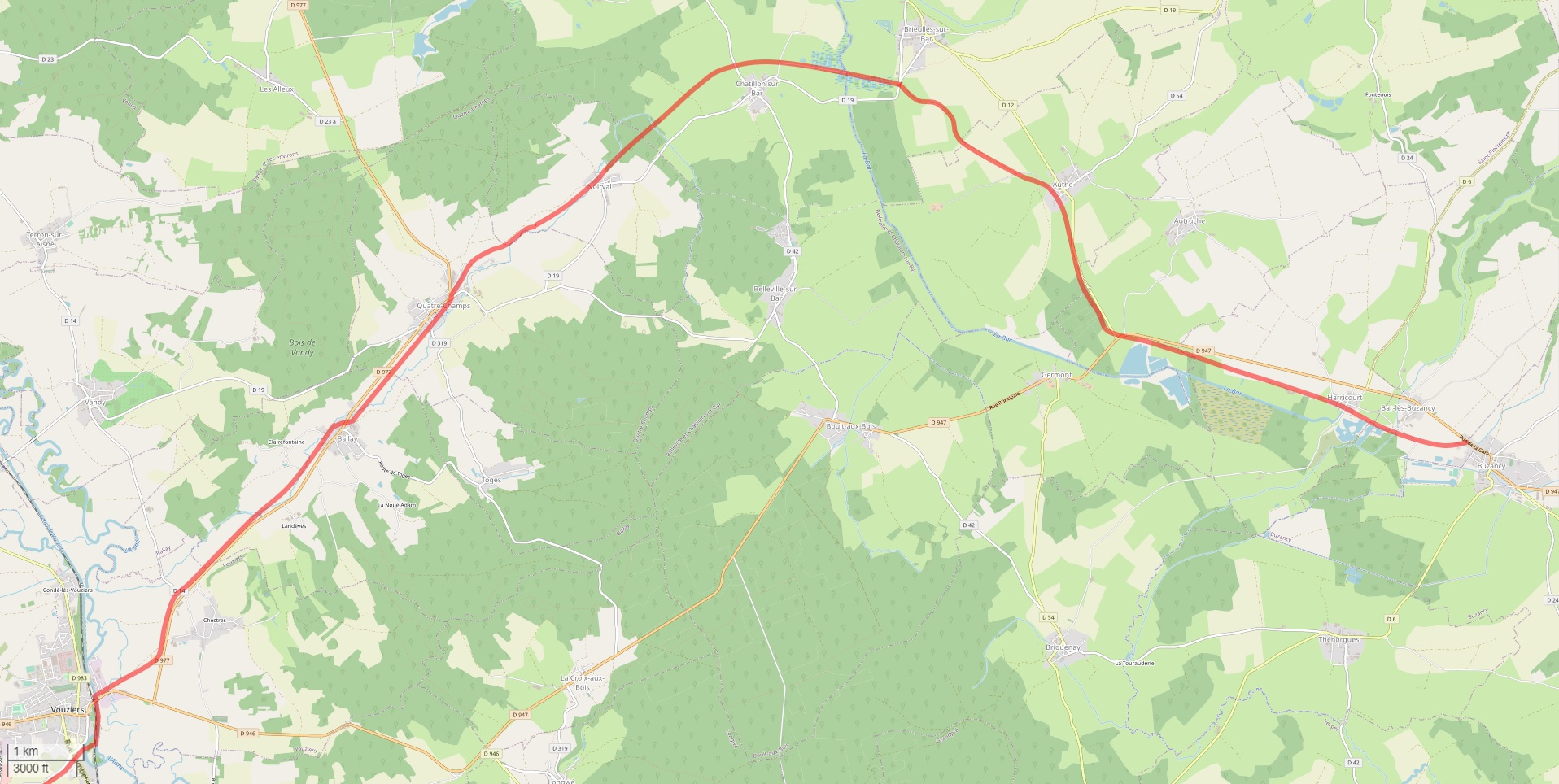
Former route of the track on a map of 2022

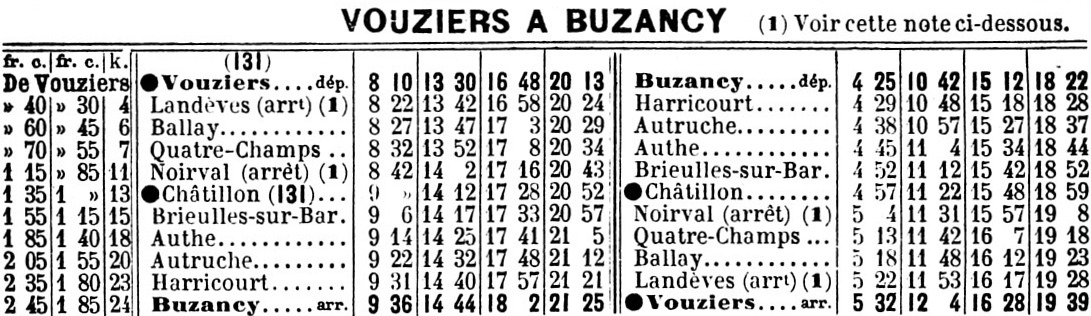
Time table of the Chemins de fer départementaux des Ardennes, May 1914

The Vouziers-Buzancy railway was an initially 24 kilometres (15 miles) long narrow gauge and later metre gauge railway in northeastern France, which was taken into service in 1897 and operated until 1933.

== History ==
The line was built by the Chemins de fer départementaux des Ardennes (CA) in 1897 as a narrow gauge railway with the unusual gauge of 800 mm, until it was converted to metre gauge in 1923. It was extended to Juniville in 1906 to link it with the CA narrow-gauge Le Châtelet-Juniville line, which had already been built in 1900, and then operated until 1933.

== Bridges and Stations ==
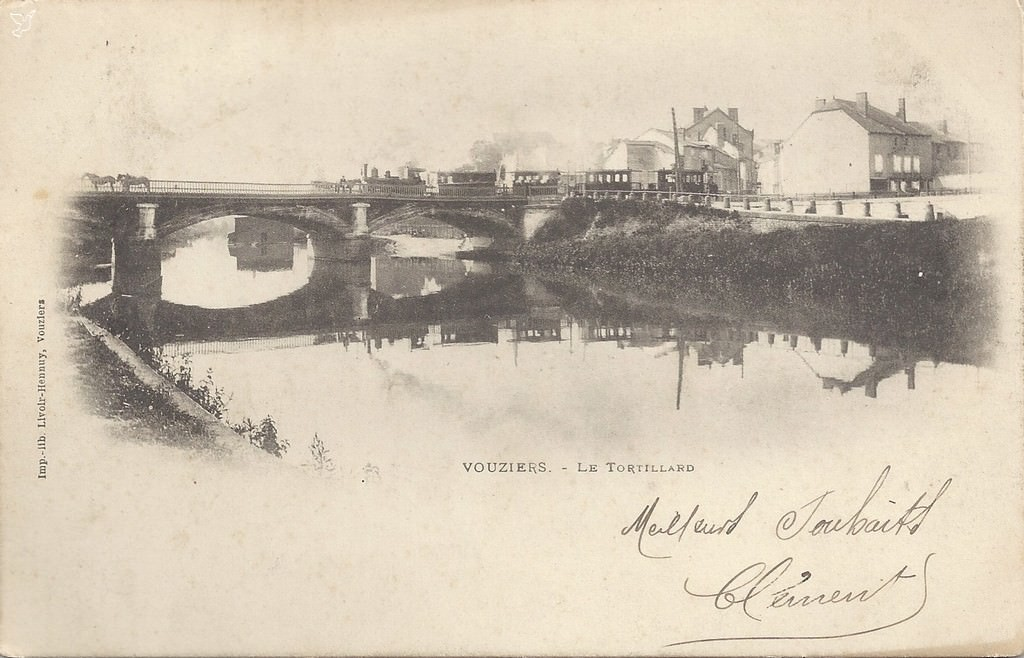
Bridge over the Aisne in Vouziers

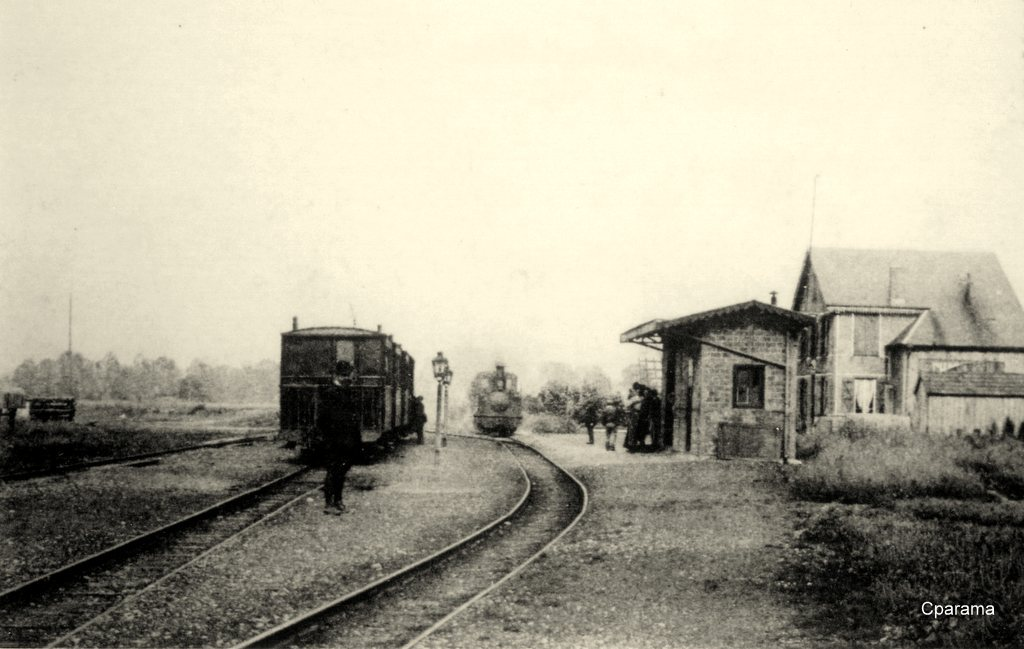
Châtillon-sur-Bar

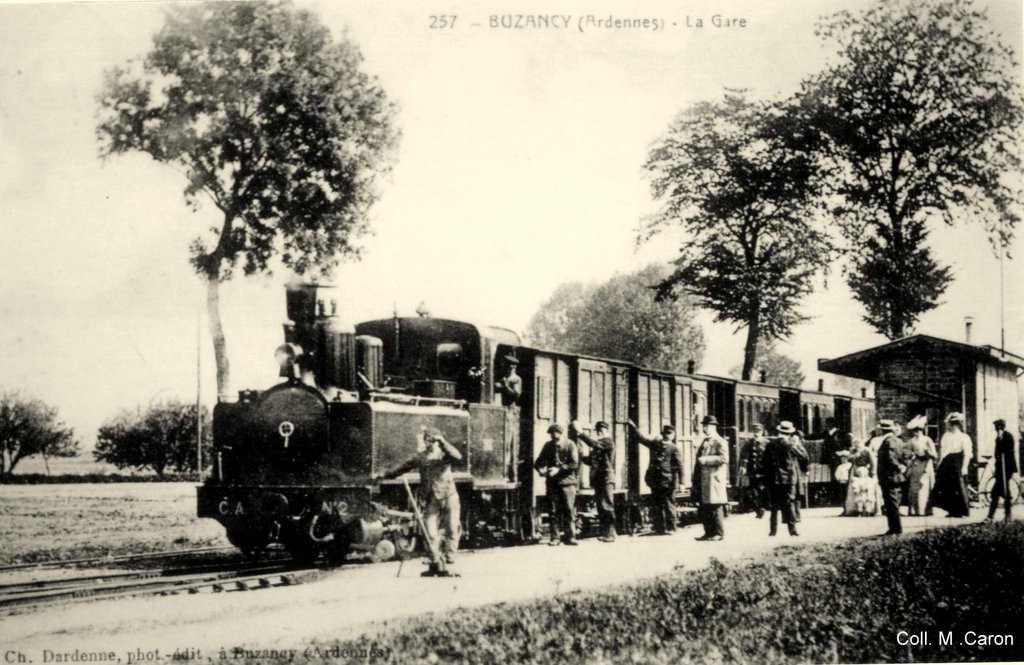
Buzancy
