= Nouzon–Gespunsart–Corbion railway =

Railway line in France and Belgium

Coordinates: 49.810614957373666°N 4.865713325010855°E

Raucourt–Vendresse
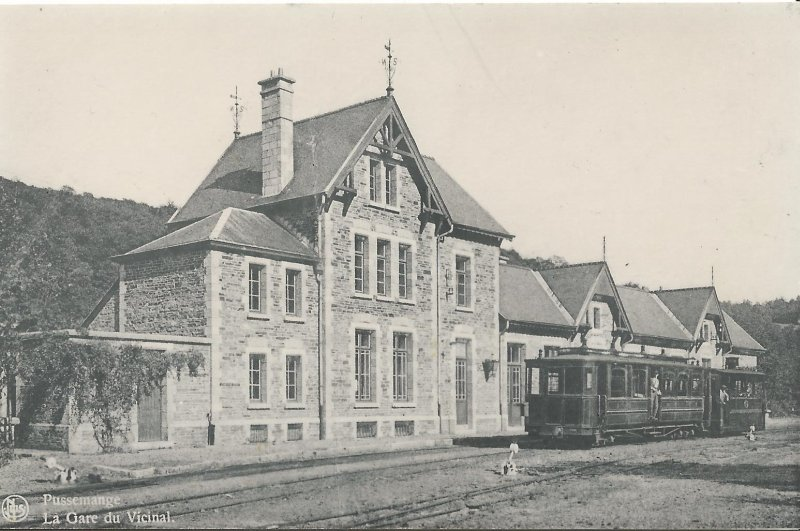
- Station of the secondary railway at Pussemange

Technical
- Line length: 26 kilometres (20 mi)
- Track gauge: Until 1903: 800 mm (2 ft 7 1/2 in); From 1903 1,000 mm (3 ft 3 3/8 in)
Route map
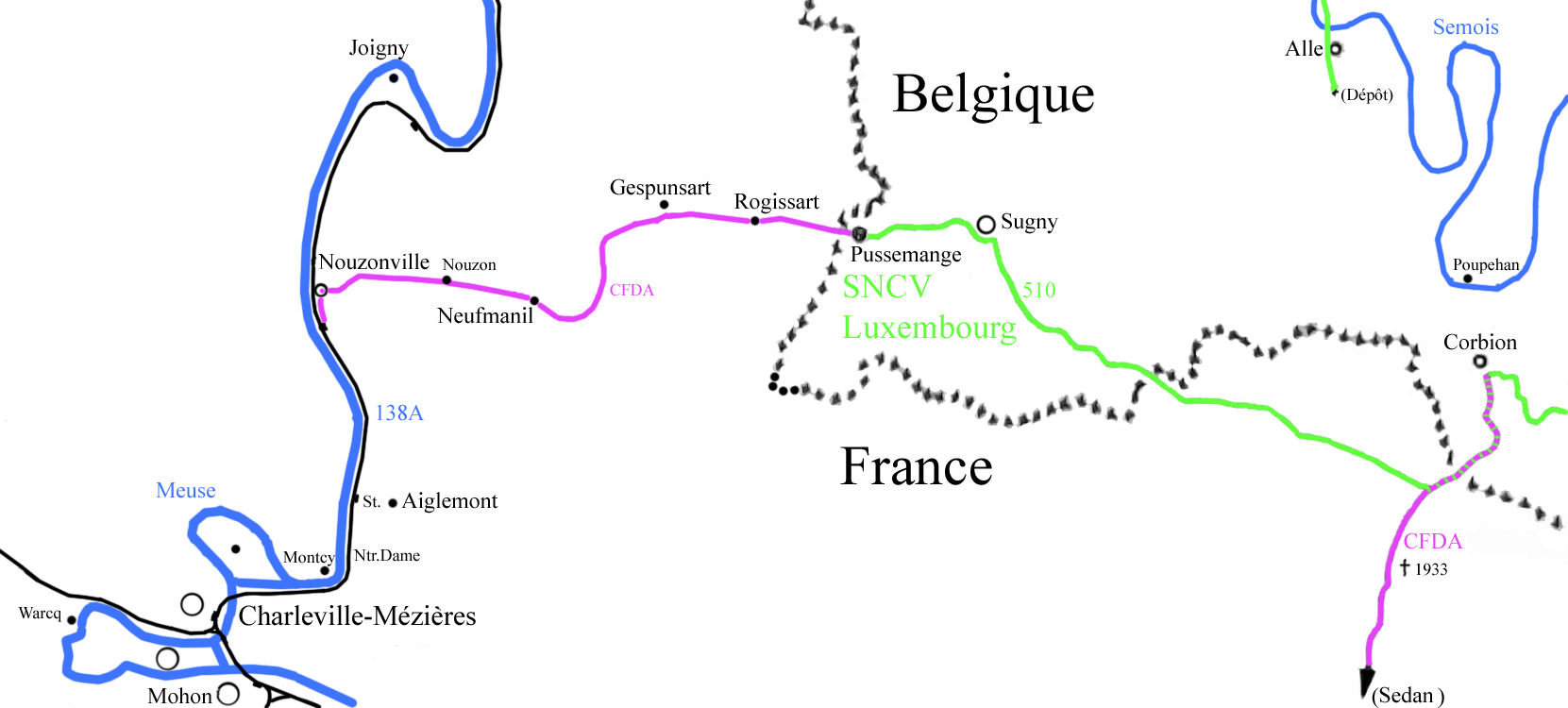
Route of the track, 1940Streckenverlauf, 1940
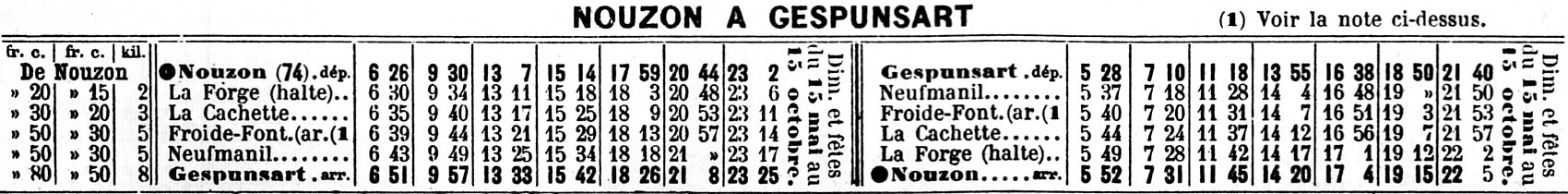

The Nouzon–Gespunsart–Corbion railway was a 26 kilometres (16 mi) cross-border narrow gauge railway in the north of France and south of Belgium, which was put into service in sections from 1896 with a gauge of 800 mm (2 ft 7 1/2 in), converted to metre gauge (1,000 mm / 3 ft 3 3/8 in) in 1903, and operated in sections until 1955.

== History ==
The Nouzon–Gespunsart section was built by the Chemins de fer départementaux des Ardennes at the insistence of the French military with the unusual 800 mm gauge for strategic reasons, to make it more difficult for an enemy army to use in the event of an invasion. It was put into service in 1896 and converted to metre gauge in 1903.

In Belgium, the National Company of Light Railways (Société nationale des chemins de fer vicinaux, SNCV) built the Sugny–Corbion section in 1924, in the aftermath of World War I, and in the following year the Gespunsart–Sugny cross-border section was put into service. During the World War II, cross-border operations on the Gespunsart–Pussemange section were shut down in 1940 and did not resume in the post-war period. Due to declining traffic, the Nouzonville–Gespunsart section in France was closed in 1950 and the Pussemange–Corbion section in Belgium in 1955.

== Stations ==
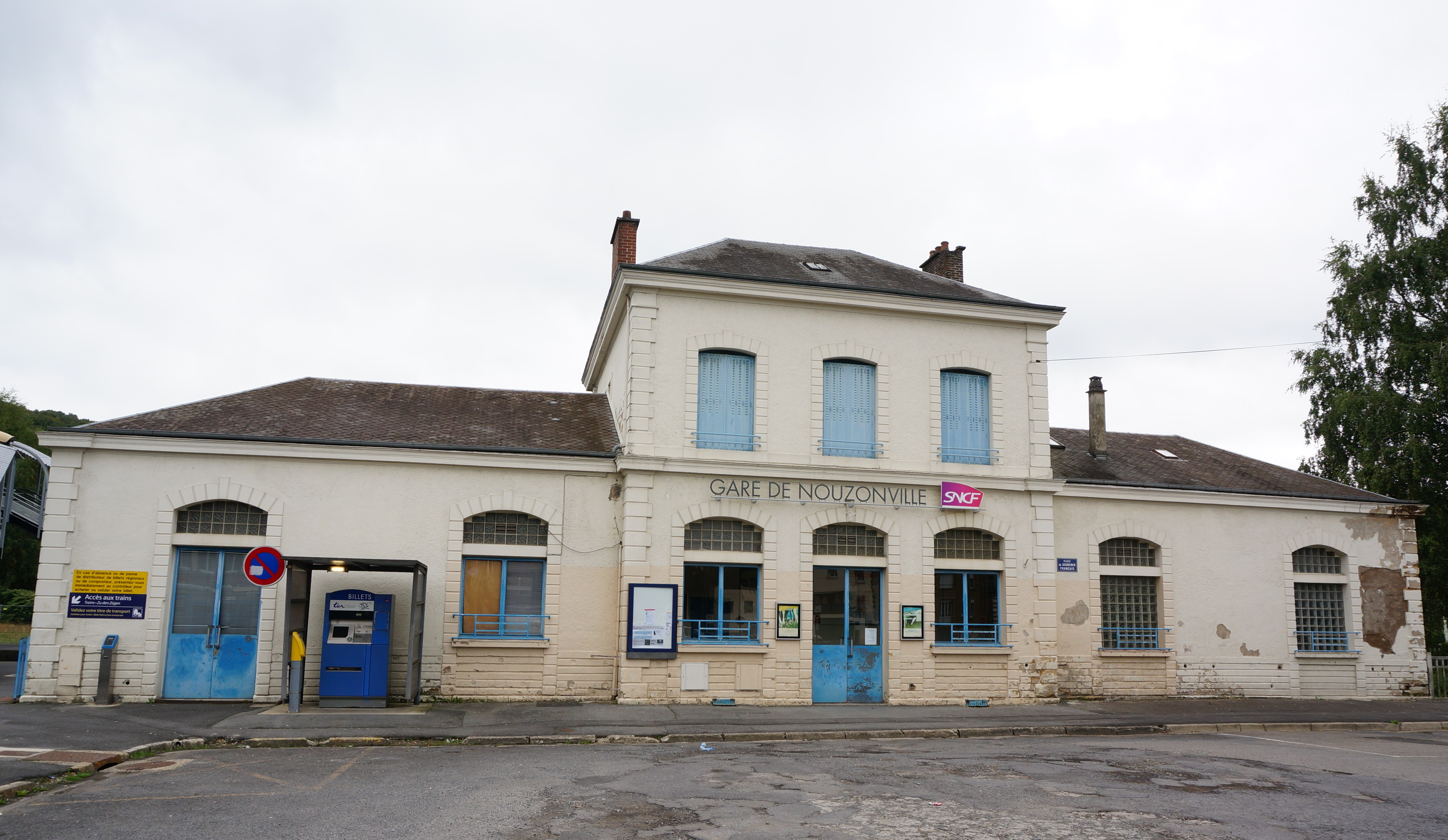
Nouzonville

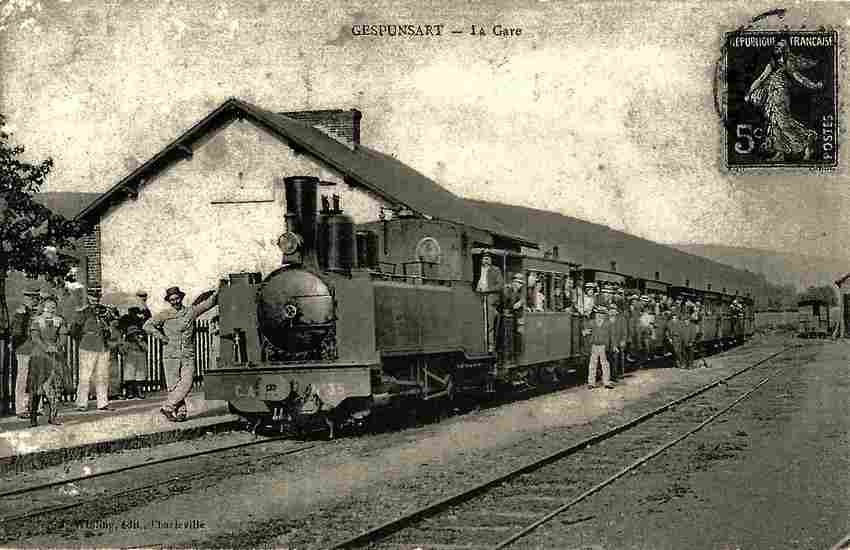
Gespunsart

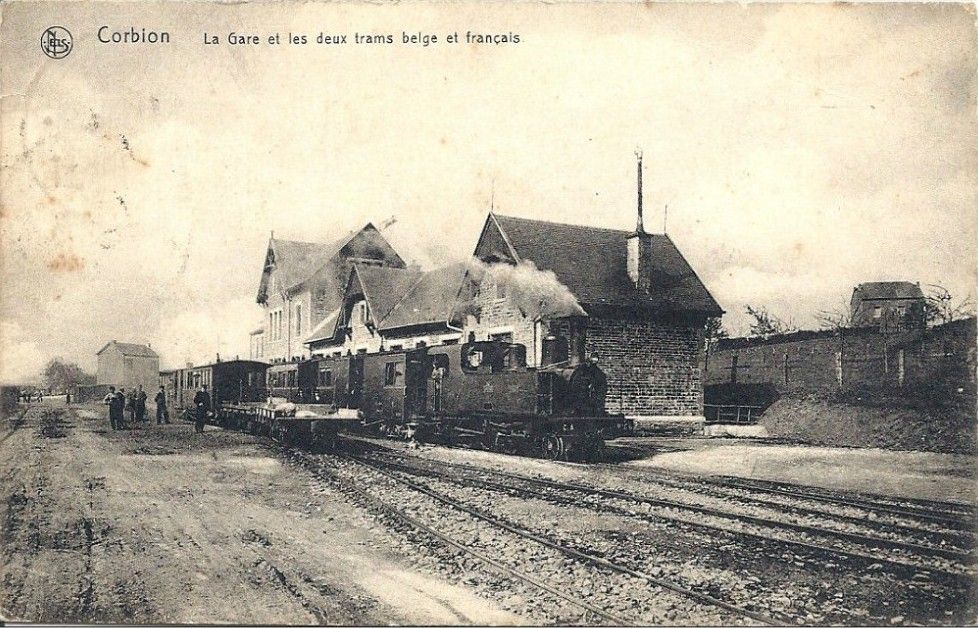
Immigration control at Corbion with trams of CA and SNCV
