= Monte Generoso Observatory =

Swiss observatory

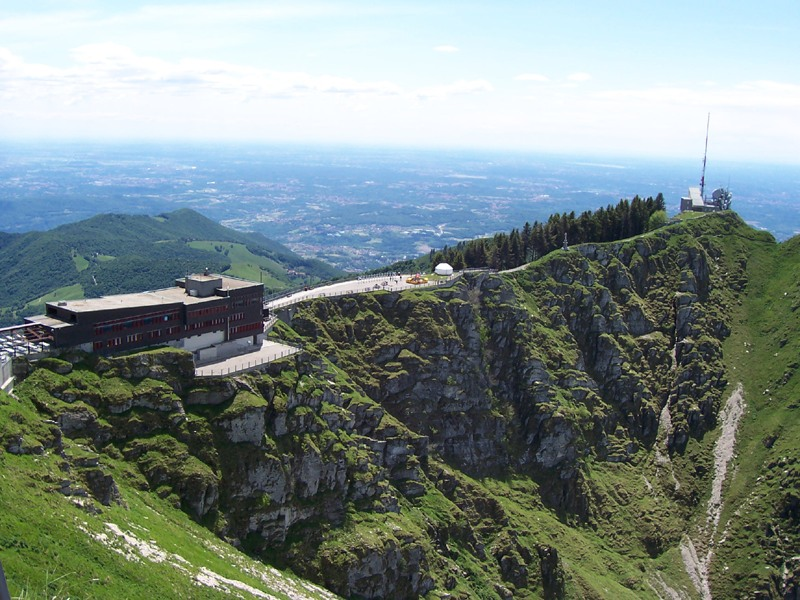
- Alternative names: Osservatorio del Monte Generoso
- Organization: Monte Generoso Insubrica Astronomy Group, Ferrovia MonteGeneroso SA
- Observatory code: 179
- Location: Monte Generoso, Ticino, Switzerland
- Coordinates: 45.927°N 9.018°E
- Established: 1996
- Closed: 2020

Telescopes
- main: Reflecting Ritchey-Chrétien telescope, diameter: 61 cm, focal length: 5 m

The Monte Generoso Observatory (Italian: Osservatorio del Monte Generoso) was an astronomical observatory that used to be located near Generoso Vetta atop Monte Generoso in the canton of Ticino, Switzerland. It was initially opened in 1996 with Italian astrophysicist Margherita Hack as its patron. The observatory was operated by the Monte Generoso Insubrica Astronomy Group with the support of the Migros Culture Percentage. On 3 May 2021, the observatory was dismantled and preparations were made to transfer it to Park im Grünen in Bern. On 20 March 2022, the rebuilt observatory was opened at Park im Grünen and renamed the Observatory on the Gurten.
