= Attigny–Baâlons railway =

Railway line in France

Coordinates: 49.48345°N 4.58081°E

Attigny–Baâlons
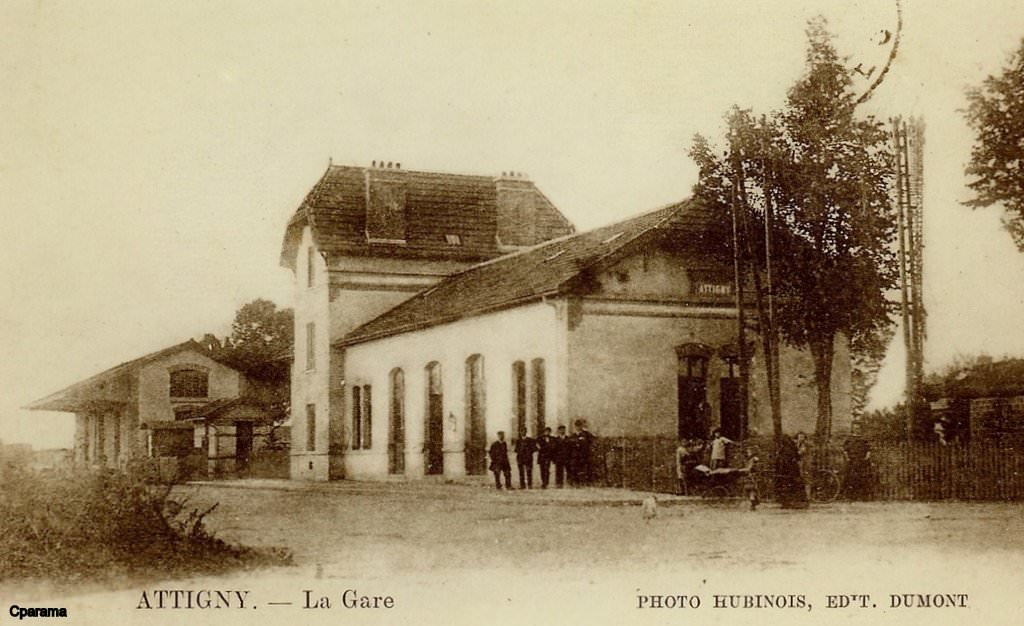
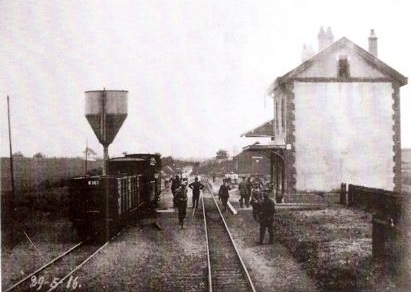
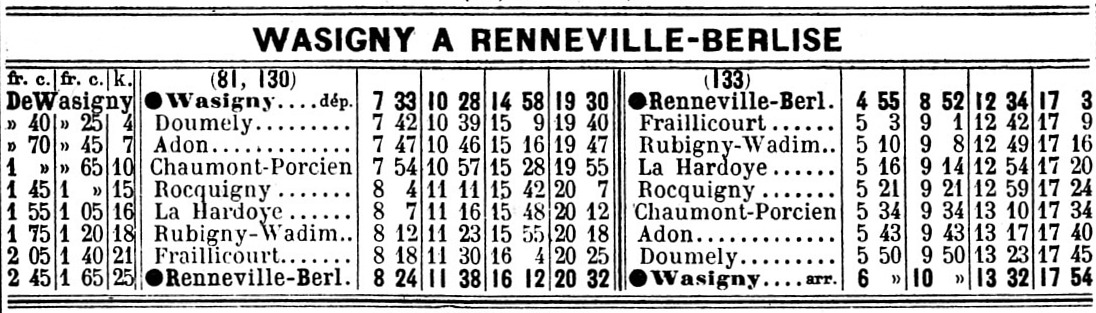
- Artigny station Baâlons station Time table, May 1914

Technical
- Line length: 18 km (11 mi)
- Track gauge: Until 1923: 800 mm (2 ft 7 1/2 in); After 1923: 1,000 mm (3 ft 3 3/8 in)

The Attigny–Baâlons railway was an 18 kilometres (11 miles) long narrow gauge and metre gauge railway in the north of France, which was put into service in sections 1904 and operated until 1948.

== History ==
The secondary railway line of the Chemins de fer départementaux des Ardennes was built with the unusual 800 mm gauge for military considerations, so that it could not be used by enemy rail vehicles in the event of an invasion. It was opened in 1904, only converted to metre gauge after the First World War around 1923, and operated until 1933.
