= Bellavista railway station =

Railway station in Switzerland

Bellavista
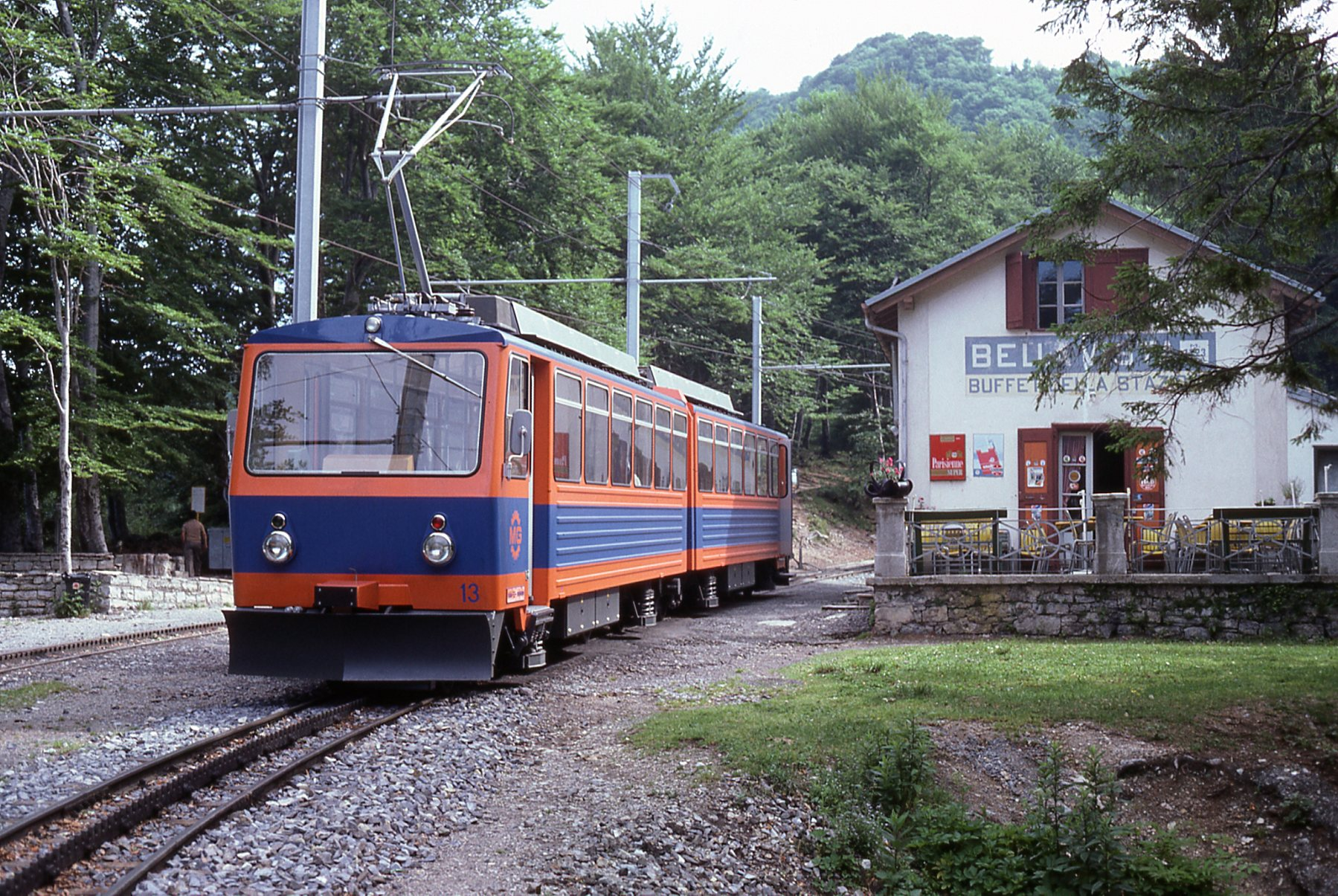

General information
- Location: Bellavista; Mendrisio, Ticino; Switzerland
- Coordinates: 45.911272°N 9.001172°E
- Elevation: 1,222 m (4,009 ft)
- Line: Monte Generoso railway
Location
- Location within Switzerland

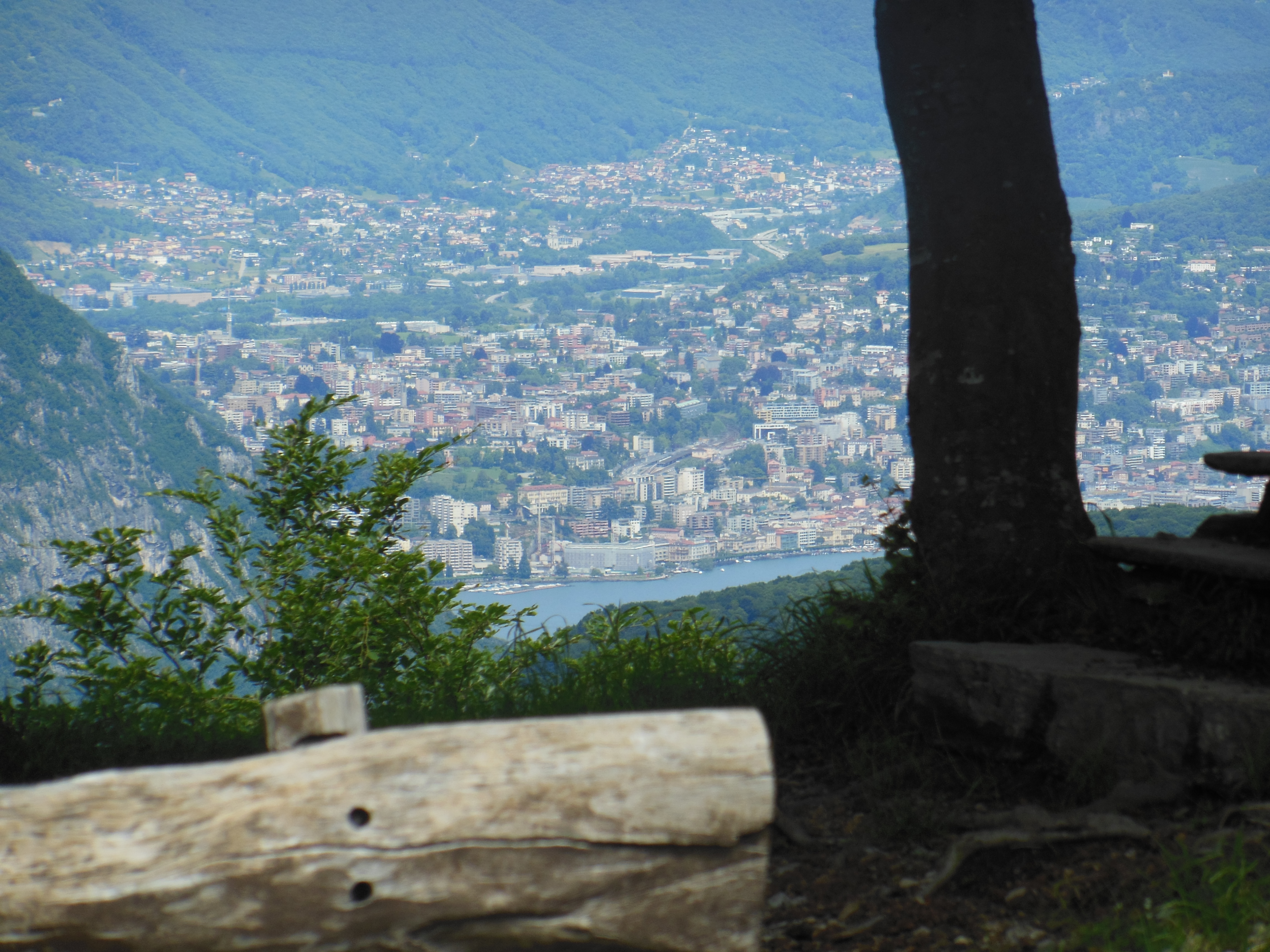
View of Lugano from the station

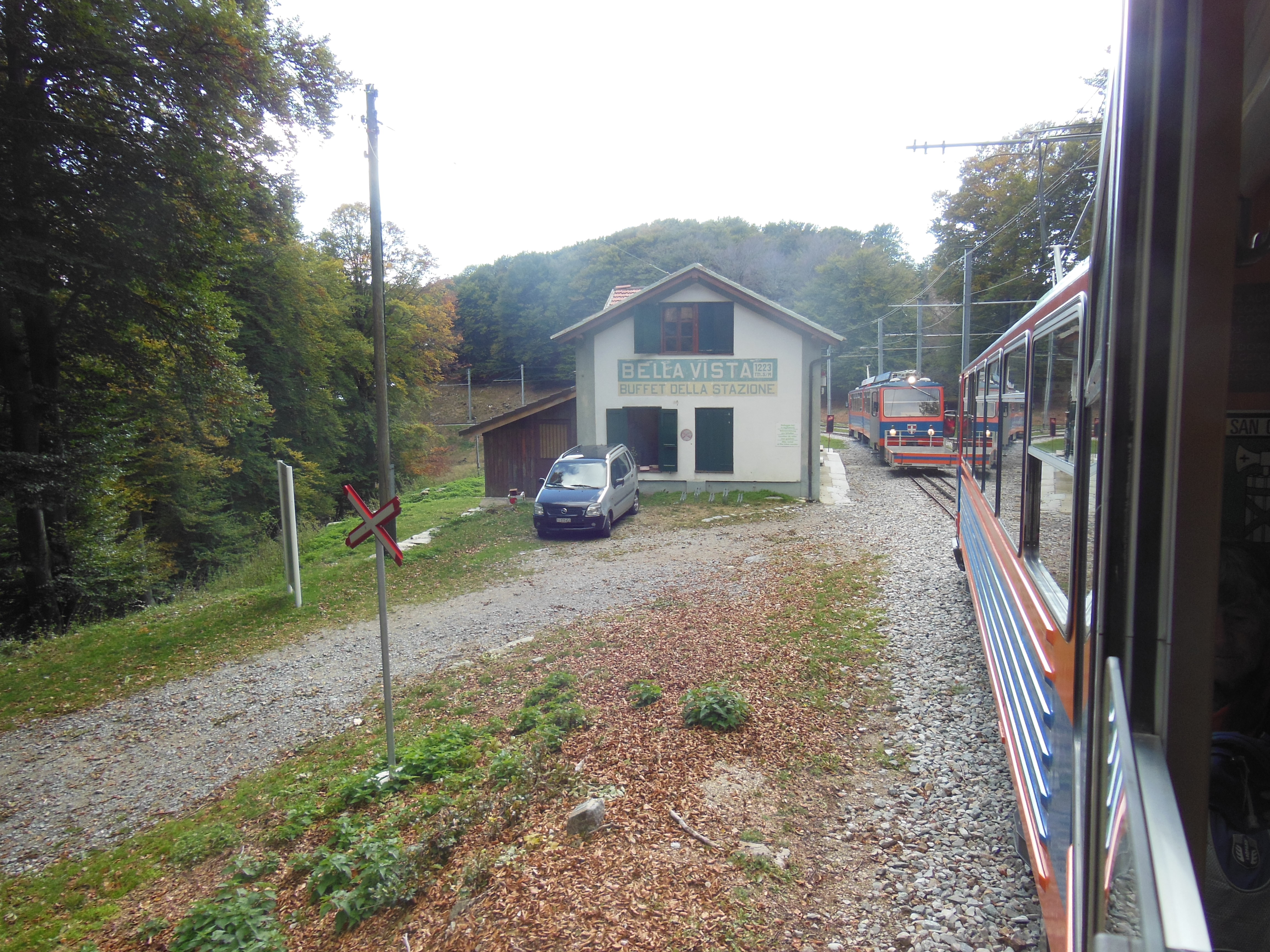
Route of the former tramway diverging to the left, with lean-to shelter for tramcar to left of parked car

Bellavista is a railway station on the Monte Generoso railway, a rack railway that connects Capolago with the summit of Monte Generoso in the Swiss canton of Ticino. Bellavista is the principal intermediate station on the line, and at one time the junction point for the Tramway Bellavista.

== Bellavista station ==
The station has a passing loop and an additional siding. It is the principle intermediate station, and the normal passing point of uphill and downhill trains. The station incorporates a popular station buffet, a picnic area, and a children's play area. The environs of the station are wooded, and include views over Lake Lugano and the city of Lugano.

The station is served by the following passenger trains:

Operator	Train Type	Route	Typical Frequency	Notes
Monte Generoso railway		Capolago Lago - Capolago-Riva San Vitale - San Nicolao - Bellavista - Generoso Vetta	9 per day; hourly	Operates in summer only; only 1 train per day between Capolago Lago and Capolago-Riva San Vitale

There is also road access from Mendrisio to Bellavista, the highest point on the mountain with such access. A hiking trail links Bellavista to the summit.

== Tramway Bellavista ==
In 1867, well before the railway opened, Carlo Pasta built a hotel near to the current location of the Bellavista station. In 1891, shortly after the line opened, a 0.4-kilometre (0.25 mi) long tramway was opened to link the station with the hotel. The line was built to 600 mm (1 ft 11 5/8 in) gauge, and used a single, horse-drawn, tramcar. Sources differ on the closure date of the line, with both 1913 and 1938 being quoted.

The lean-to shed behind Bellavista station building, in which the line's tramcar was kept, can still be seen, as can parts of the trackbed. The hotel has since been demolished, and is now a picnic site.
