= Mendrisio electric tramway =

Tramway line in Ticino, Switzerland

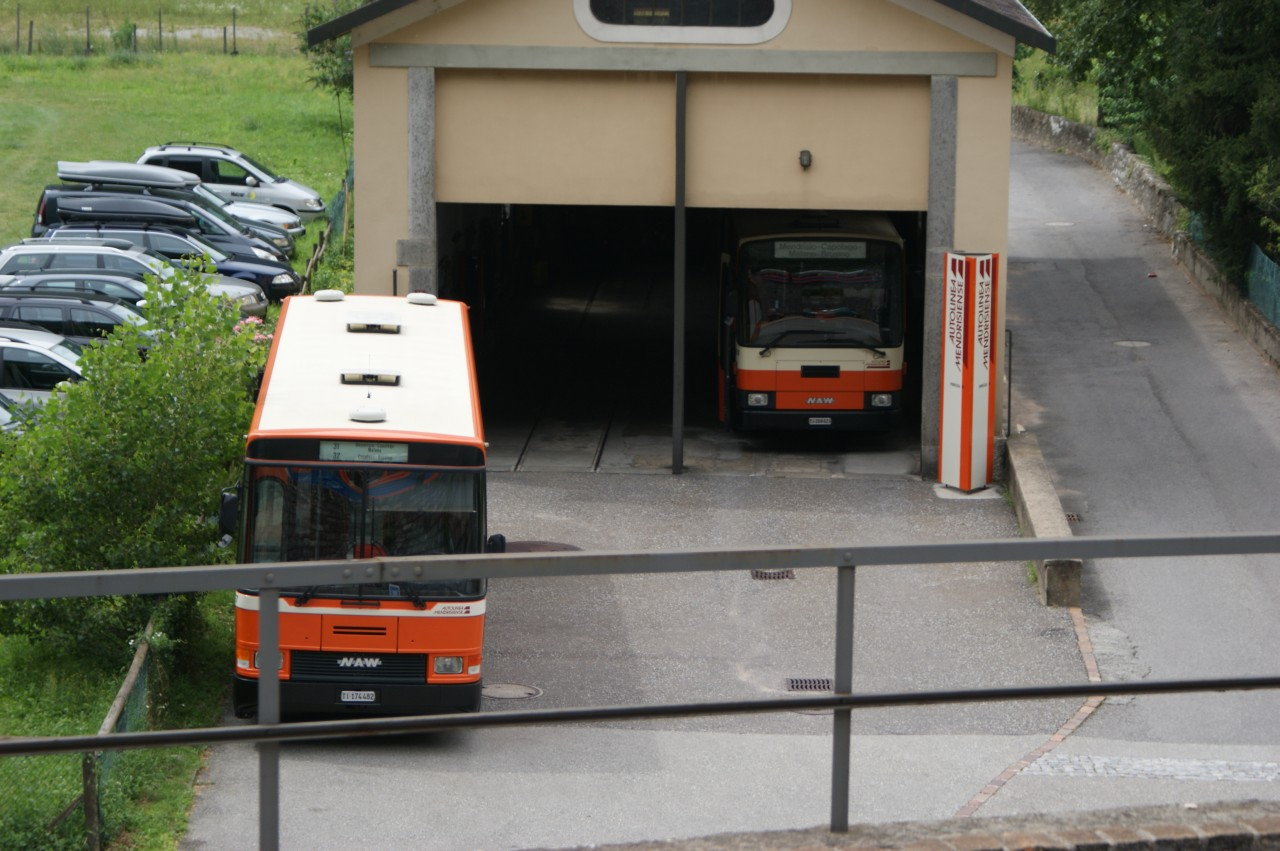
- The former depot of the Mendrisio electric tramway in Capolago, showing retained metre gauge track, and with buses of the Autolinea Mendrisiense SA.

Overview
- Status: Closed and removed
- Locale: Canton of Ticino, Switzerland
- Termini: Chiasso; Riva San Vitale
- Stations: 49

Service
- Services: 1

History
- Opened: 1910
- Closed: 1950

Technical
- Line length: 11.9 kilometres (7.4 mi)
- Track gauge: 1,000 mm (3 ft 3 3/8 in)
- Minimum radius: 25 metres (82 ft)
- Electrification: 800 V DC, overhead
- Maximum incline: 7.5%
Route map

The Mendrisio electric tramway (Italian: Tram Elettrici Mendrisiensi, TEM) was a metre gauge electric tramway in the Swiss canton of Ticino. It linked the town of Chiasso with Riva San Vitale, via Balerna, Mendrisio and Capolago. It was operated by the Società Tram Elettrici Mendrisiensi SA.

The line's southern terminus in Chiasso was adjacent to the border crossing with Italy, and in Capolago it shared the same street outside Capolago-Riva San Vitale railway station with the Monte Generoso railway. The track ran entirely within the street, and was electrified at 800 V DC. It had a length of 11.9 kilometres (7.4 mi), with 49 stops, a maximum gradient of 7.5% and a minimum radius of 25 metres (82 ft).

The Società Tram Elettrici Mendrisiensi SA was incorporated in 1907, and construction started the following year, with the tramway opening in 1910. The line closed throughout in 1950, having closed between Riva San Vitale and Mendrisio in 1948. In 1953, the company changed its name to the Autolinea Mendrisiense SA, and now operates Mendrisio's local bus service, including services covering much of the former route of the tramway.

Very little remains of the tramway, although the line's main depot in Mendrisio was used by Autolinea Mendrisiense until 2010, and a smaller depot in Capolago is still used by them as a bus garage. After closure, several of the line's cars were sold to the Lugano–Cadro–Dino railway, and one of these (Ce 2/2 3) has since been restored and is now on display at the Hotel Coronado in Mendrisio.

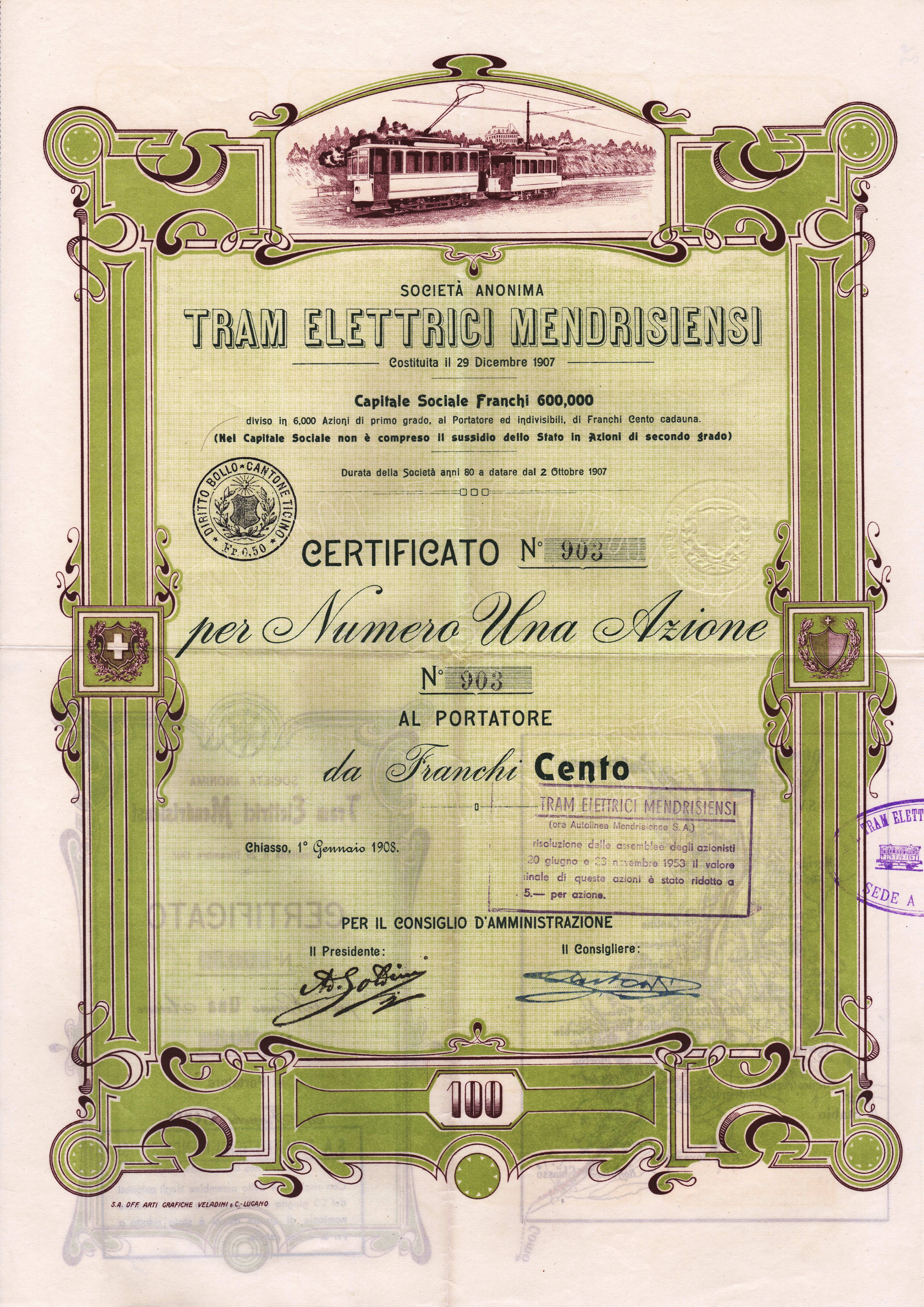
Share of the Tram Elettrici Mendrisiensi, issued 1. January 1908

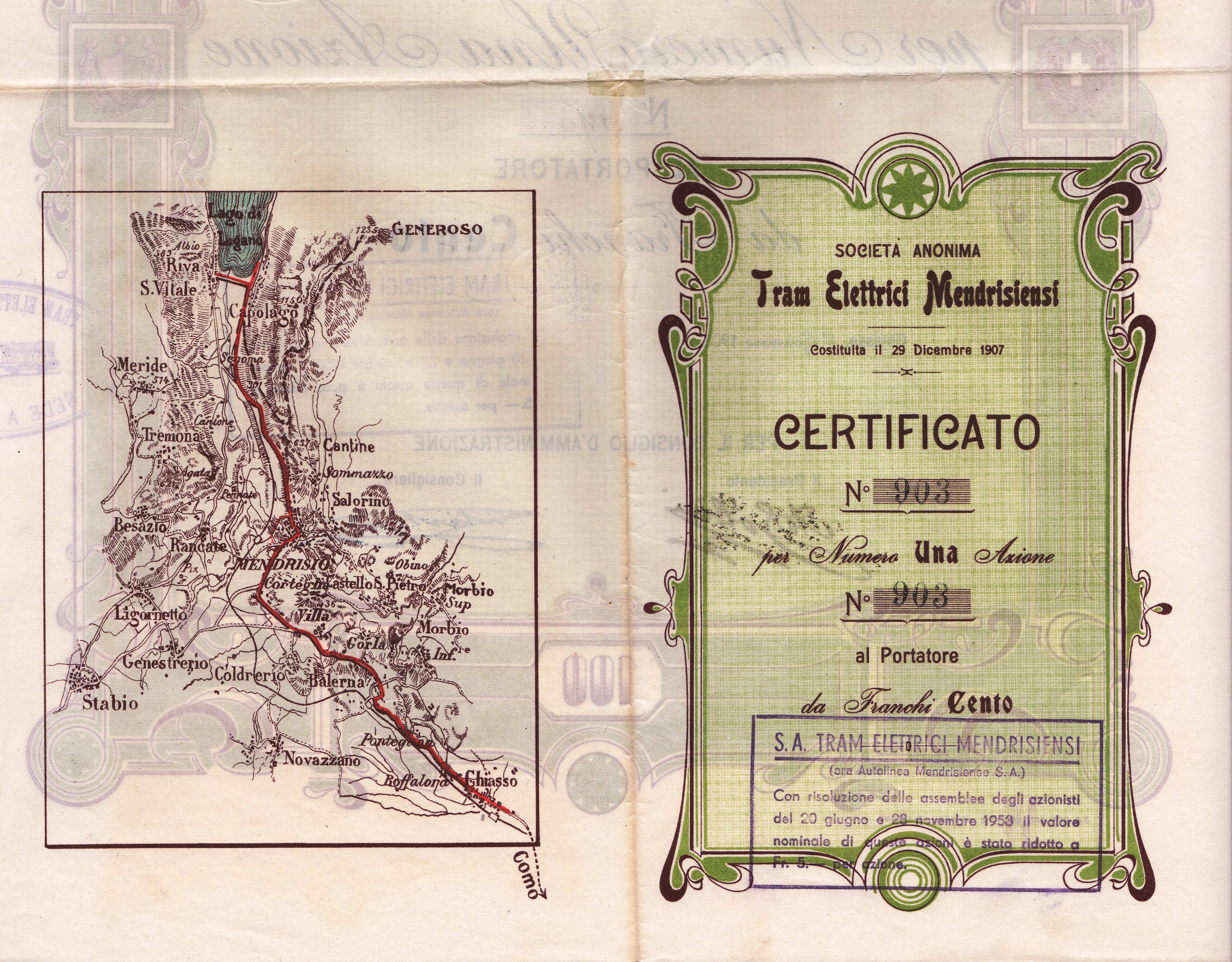
Share of the Tram Elettrici Mendrisiensi, issued 1. January 1908, reverse side
