= Tremblois-lès-Rocroi–Petite-Chapelle railway =

Railway line in France

Coordinates: 49.85106°N 4.50274°E

Tremblois-lès-Rocroi–Petite-Chapelle

Technical
- Line length: 17 km (11 mi)
- Track gauge: Until 1903: 800 mm (2 ft 7 1/2 in) after 1903: 1,000 mm (3 ft 3 3/8 in)
Route map
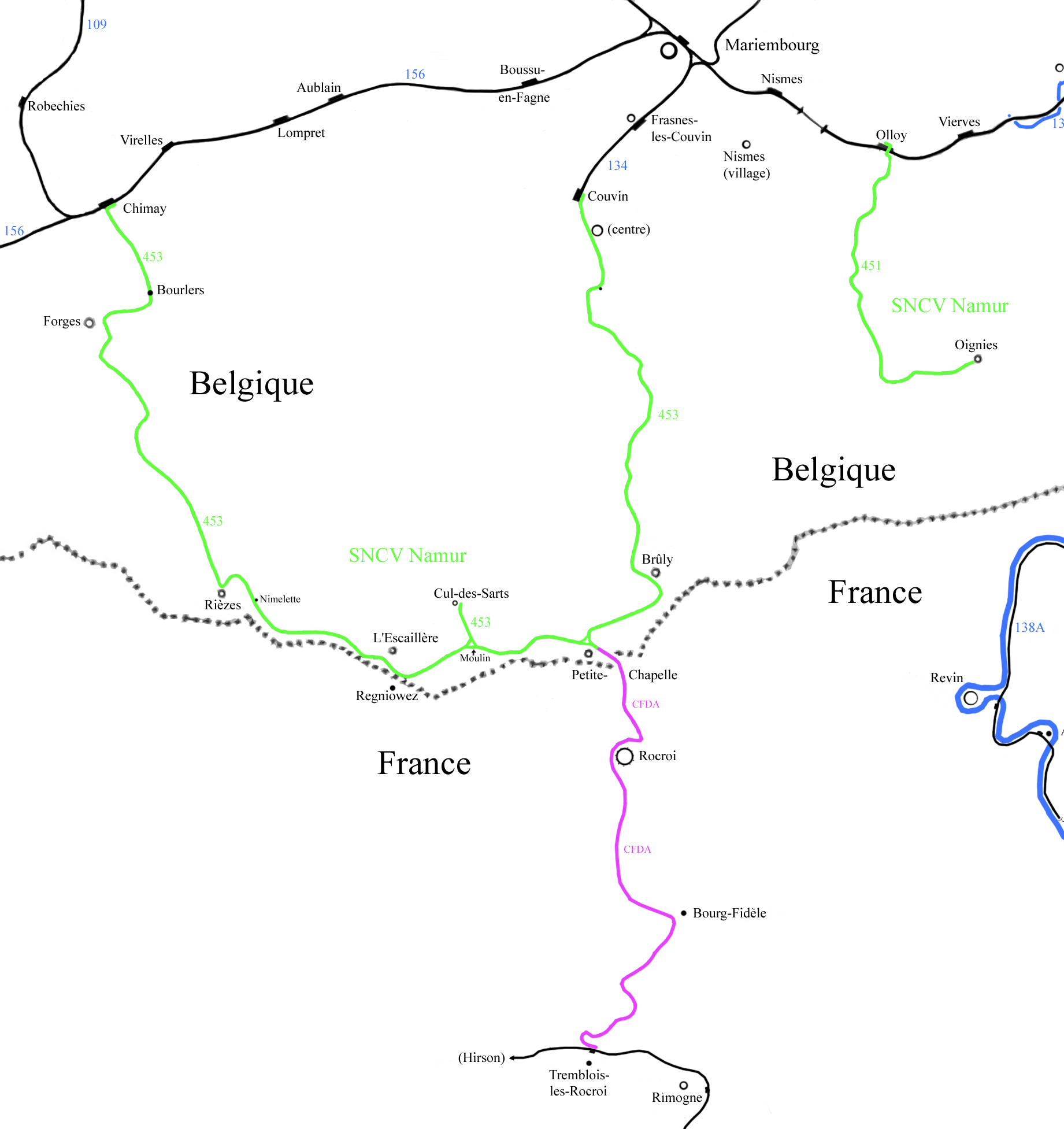
Former route of the track (purple)
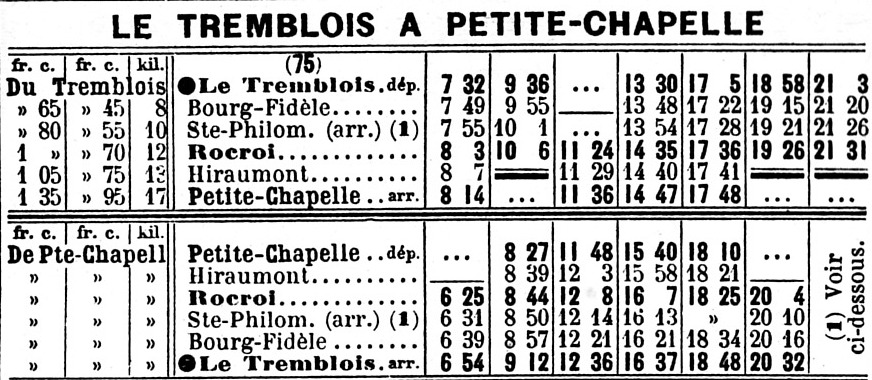
Time table of the Chemins de fer départementaux des Ardennes, May 1914

The Tremblois-lès-Rocroi–Petite-Chapelle railway was a 17 kilometres (11 miles) long narrow gauge and later metre gauge (1,000 mm / 3 ft 3 3/8 in) railway in the north of France, the first section of which was put into service in 1895. It operated until 1950.

== History ==
The first, 12 km-long (7.5 mi) section from Tremblois-lès-Rocroi to Rocroi line was built by the Chemins de fer départementaux des Ardennes in 1897 as a narrow-gauge railway with the unusual gauge of 800 mm (2 ft 7 1/2 in). In 1903, following a change in the law, the line was converted to metre gauge. It was extended across the border to Petite-Chapelle in Belgium in 1905 and operated until 1950.

== Stations ==
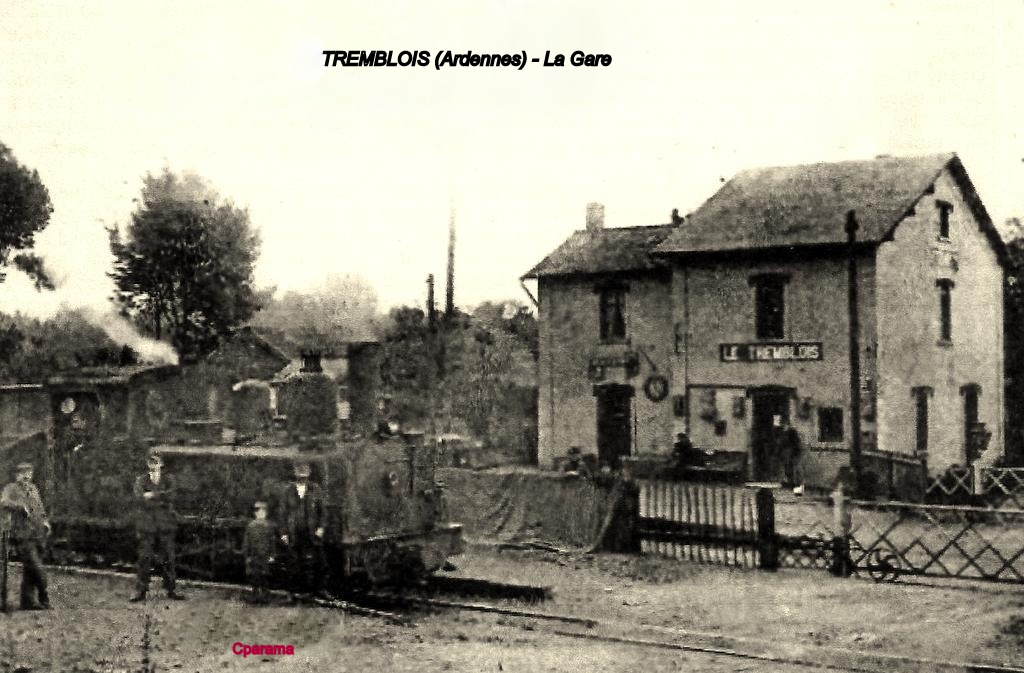
Tremblois-lès-Rocroi train station

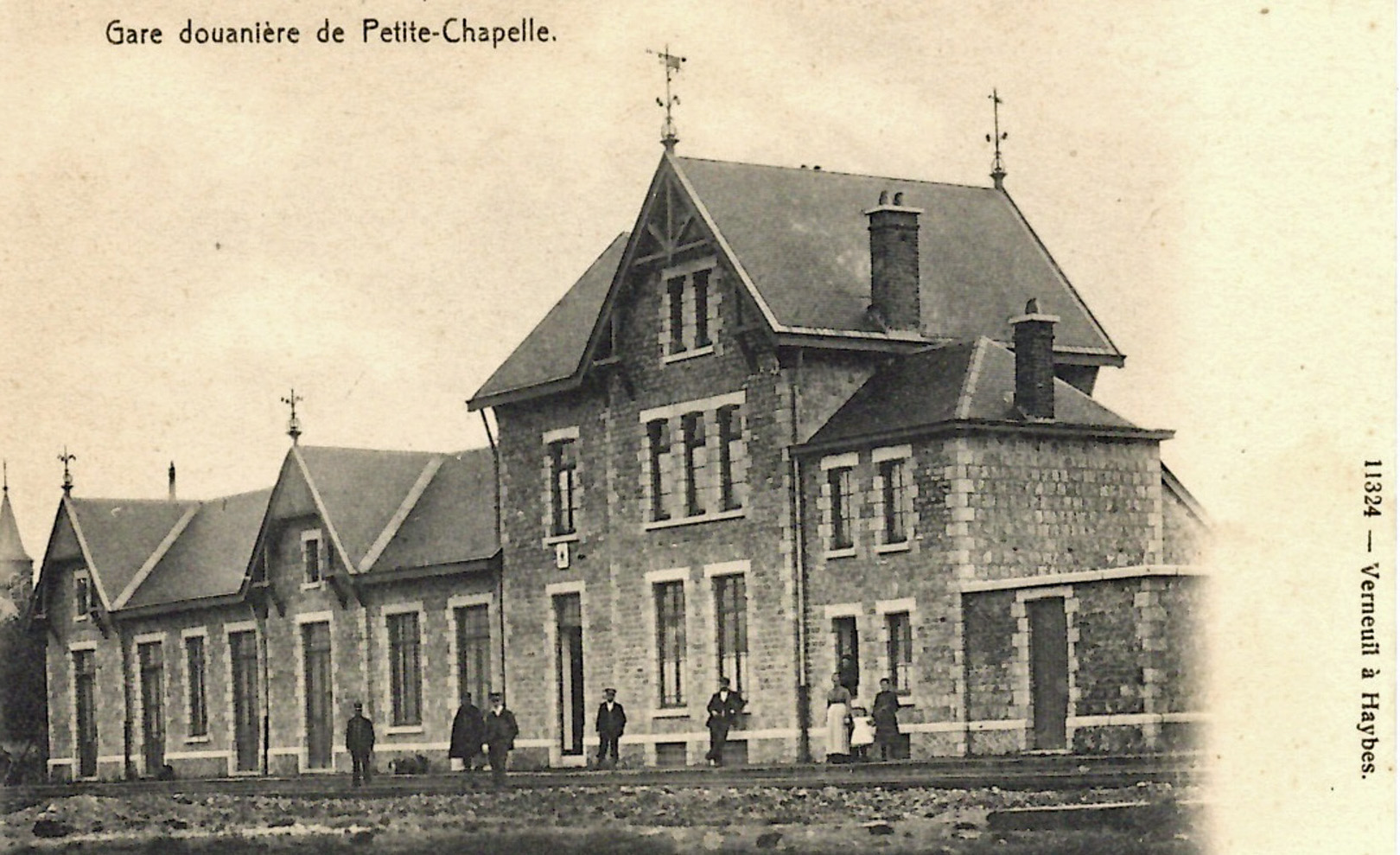
Petit Chapelle train station
