= Monte Generoso railway =

Rack railway in Ticino, Switzerland

Monte Generoso Railway.
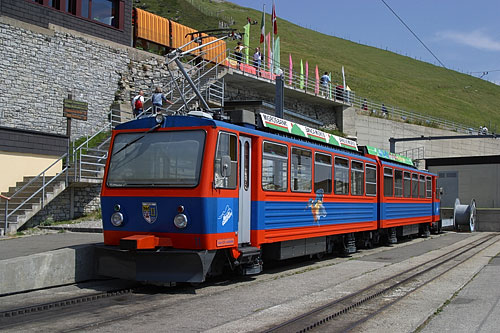
- Train at the summit station

Overview
- Status: Open
- Owner: Migros supermarket chain
- Locale: Ticino, Switzerland

History
- Opened: June 5, 1890

Technical
- Line length: 9 kilometres (5.6 mi)
- Rack system: Abt
- Track gauge: 800 mm (2 ft 7 1/2 in)
- Electrification: 850 V, DC, overhead
- Highest elevation: 1,605 m (5,266 ft)
- Maximum incline: 22%
Route map
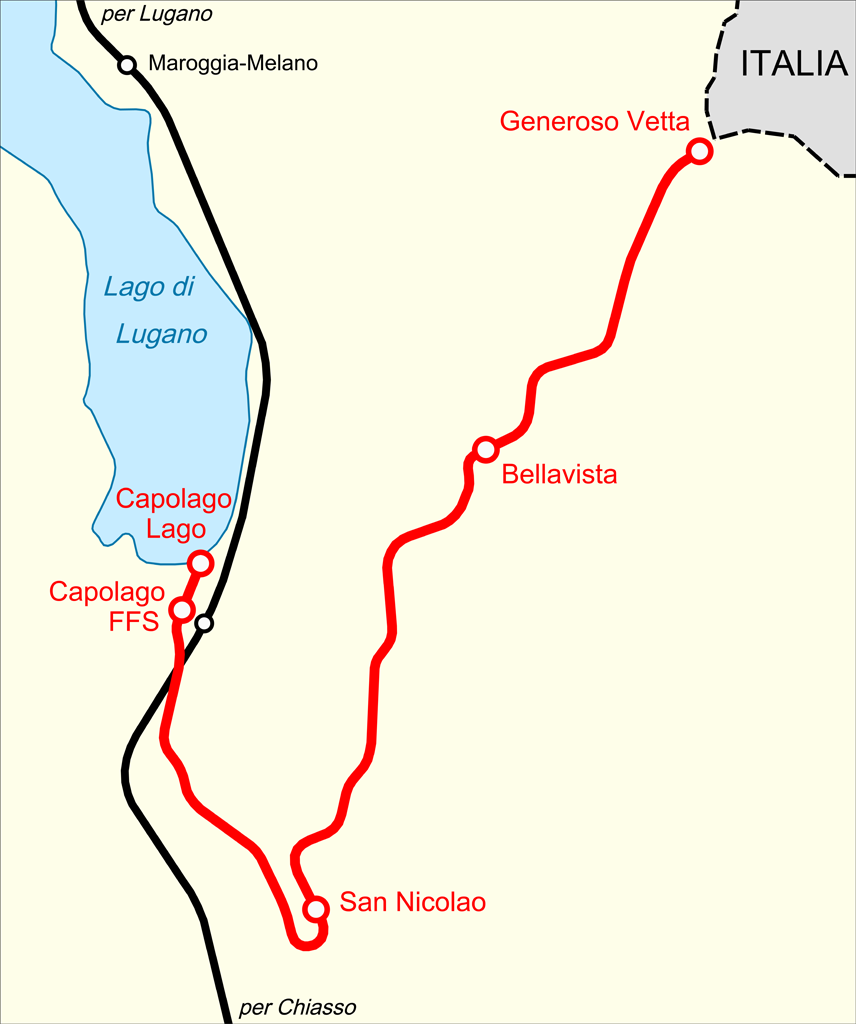

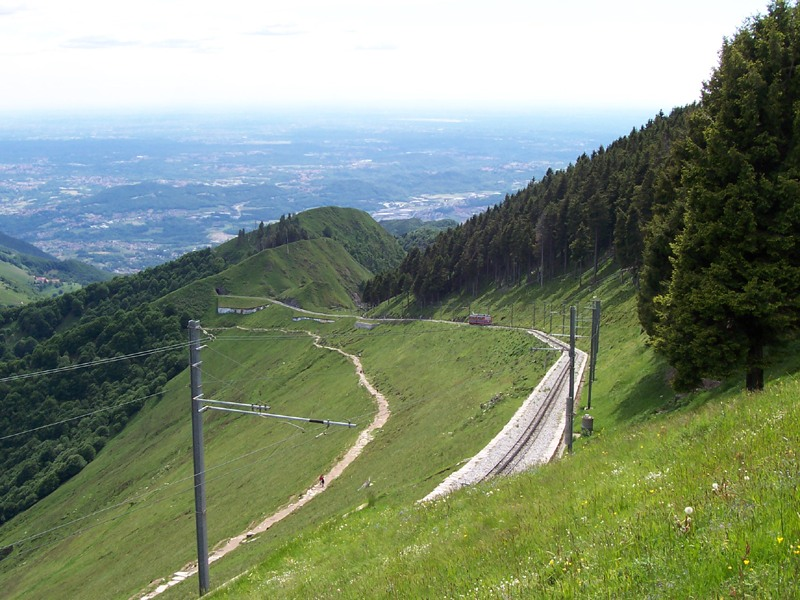
The track descending from the summit, with the Lombardy Plain in the background.

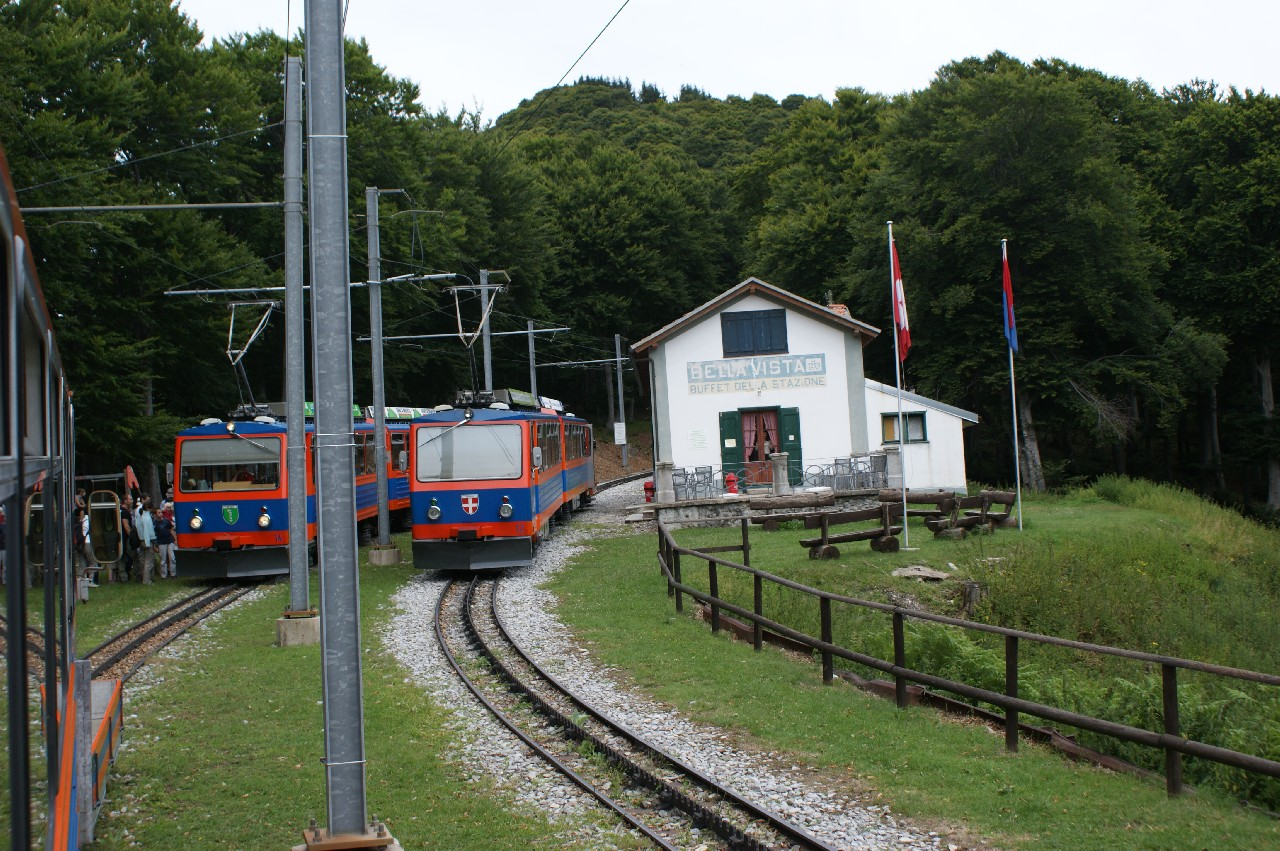
Bellavista station and restaurant, with passing trains.

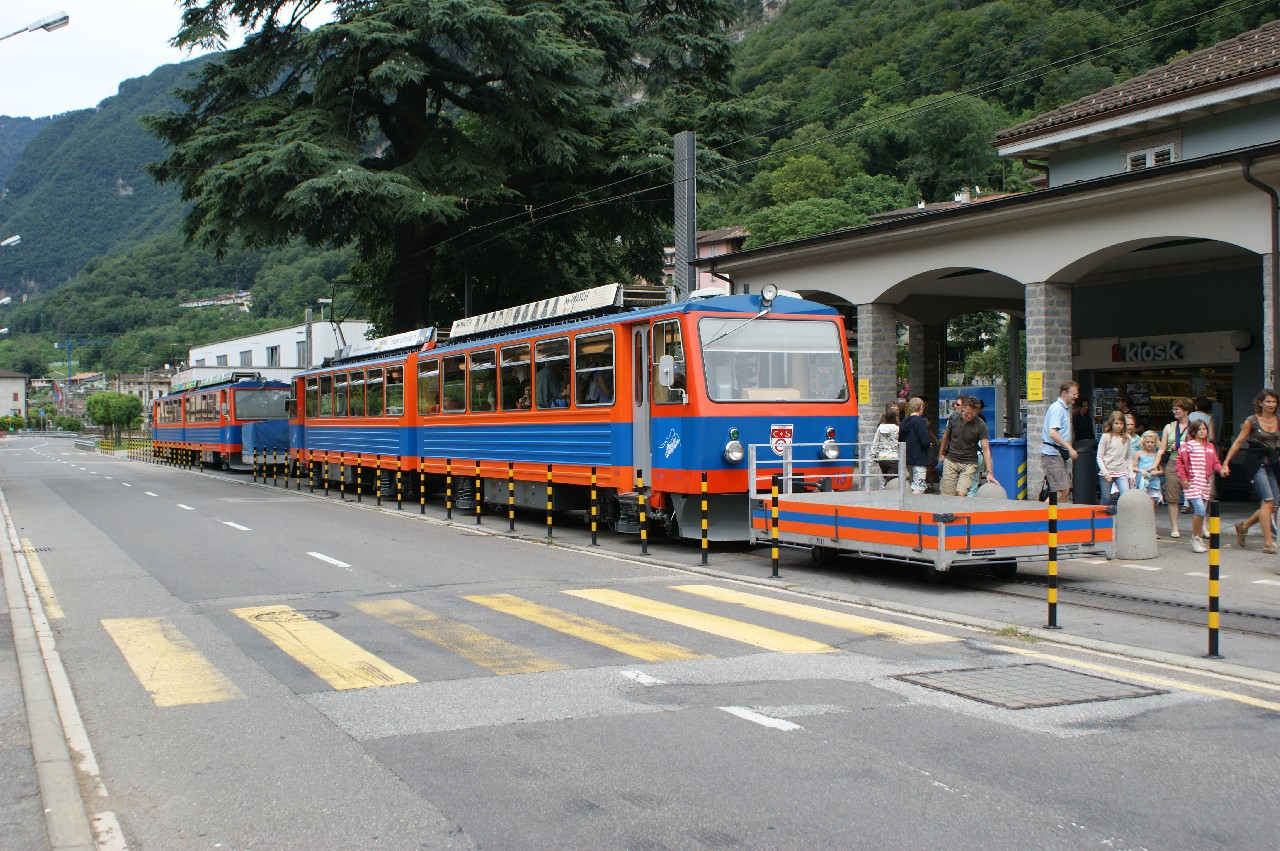
Trains waiting to depart from the Capolago-Riva San Vitale station.

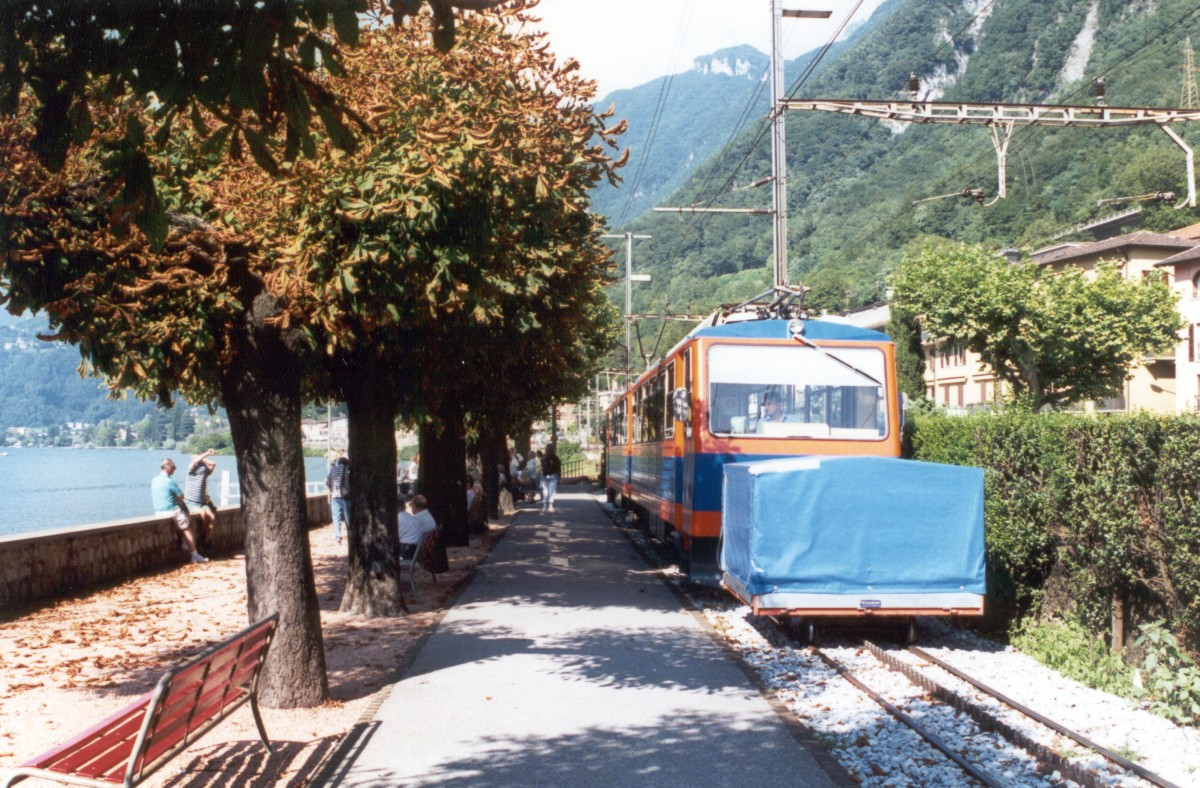
Capolago: the terminus of Monte Generoso railway near Capolago Lago landing on the shore of Lake Lugano. The mainline railway is behind the hedge to the right.

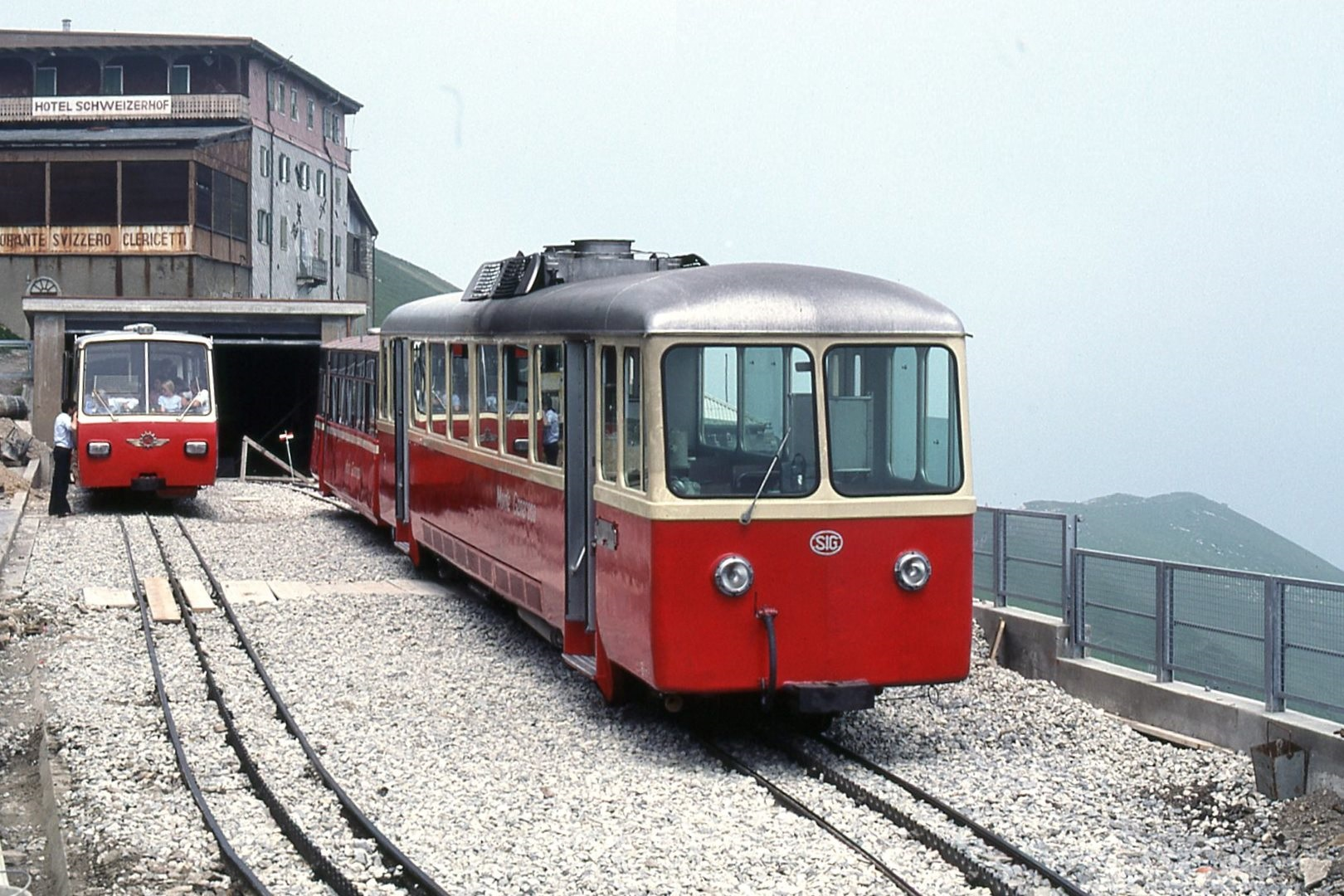
Diesel railcars at the summit prior to electrification: Bhm 1/2 (left), Bhm 2/4 (right).

The Monte Generoso Railway or Ferrovia Monte Generoso (MG) is a mountain railway line in the Italian speaking canton of Ticino, in south-east Switzerland. The line runs from Capolago, on Lake Lugano, to a terminus near the summit of Monte Generoso. It is the highest railway in Ticino. The summit (1,701 m or 5,581 ft) offers extensive views over the Lombardy Plain, part of the Po Valley, and towards the Alps.

Whilst the railway lies entirely within Switzerland, the summit station is only a few metres from the international border with the Italian region of Lombardy. The line is owned by the Migros group, better known for operating supermarkets throughout Switzerland.

== History ==
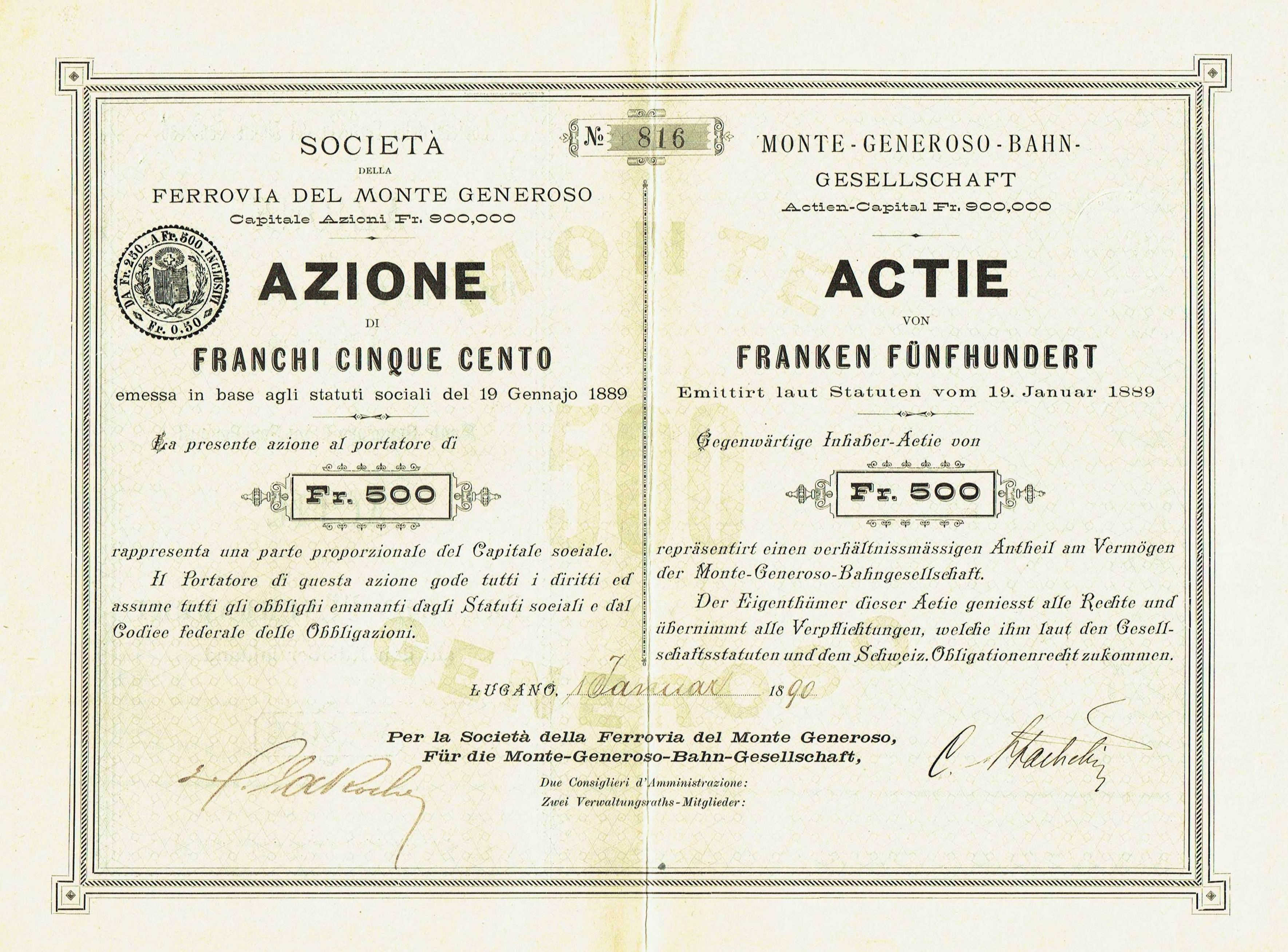
Share of the Societa della Ferrovia del Monto Generosa, issued 1. January 1890

In 1867, Doctor Carlo Pasta built a hotel on Monte Generoso, near to the current location of the Bellavista station on the Monte Generoso railway. In 1886, a concession was granted to the Monte Generoso SA for the construction of a narrow gauge and cog railway to the summit. The line opened on the June 5, 1890, and was originally operated with steam locomotives. The following year, the Tramway Bellavista was opened to link the railway to Doctor Pasta's hotel.

However the owning company encountered financial difficulties at various times during the first half of the 20th century. In the 1939, the then owners approached Gottlieb Duttweiler, the founder of the Migros group, for assistance, and in 1941 the railway became part of that group.

In 1954, two diesel locomotives (Hm 2/3 1 and 2) were built on the frames of older steam locomotives, followed, in 1957, by two four-axle diesel railcars (Bhm 2/4 3 and 4), which allowed a more economical operation. In 1968, two smaller two-axle railcars (Bhm 1/2 5 and 6) were introduced. In 1982 the line was electrified and four twin-unit railcars (Bhe 4/8 11 to 14) were supplied by SLM in 1981-2.

At the end of the season in 2013, the line closed for the winter as normal. It was then announced that it would not reopen to passengers until 2015, in order to facilitate the rebuilding of the hotel and restaurant at the summit. The closure was extended twice, and eventually the new building, designed by Mario Botta, opened on 8 April 2017. In the meantime, the railway was used for the transport of construction materials and workers.

== Route ==
The line commences at Capolago Lago station, where trains connect with boat services of the Società Navigazione del Lago di Lugano on Lake Lugano. However most trains start 300 m (984 ft) up the line at Capolago-Riva San Vitale station, at an altitude of 274 m (899 ft), where they connect with Swiss Federal Railways trains on the line from Lugano to Milan via Chiasso. The line's car shed and workshop are both situated on the line between the two Capolago stops.

At Capolago-Riva San Vitale station, the line serves a stop on the street in front of the station building, before climbing a ramp to cross a bridge over the throat of the mainline station. From here it climbs the flank of the mountain as far as San Nicolao station, at an altitude of 707 m (2,320 ft). Bellavista station, at 1,222 m (4,009 ft), follows, and with its station buffet and access to various walks is a destination in its own right. Both San Nicolao and Bellavista stations have passing loops, but the latter is the normal passing place for ascending and descending trains.

After leaving Bellavista, the line leaves the heavily forested lower slopes and runs through more open meadows before reaching the Generoso Vetta terminus, at 1,592 m (5,223 ft). The station is located a short walk from the mountain summit, and has a buffet, restaurant and rooftop viewing gallery.

== Operation ==
The line is 9 km (5.6 mi) long and is of 800 mm (2 ft 7 1/2 in) gauge. It is a rack railway, with a maximum gradient of 22%, using the Abt design. The line is electrified using an 850 V DC overhead line, and is principally operated by the four two-car electric trains built in 1981-2.

The line operates from mid-March to early November, with trains running hourly during daylight hours. If traffic requires it, the hourly departure may be operated as multiple trains running in convoy. A late evening train operates on Fridays and Saturdays only. Only one train a day runs through to Capolago Lago, in order to connect with a boat service from Lugano.

One steam locomotive still exists, as does one of the original coaches, and two diesel locomotives. The remaining steam and diesel locomotives operate occasional services. One of the Bhm 1/2 diesel railcars is preserved in the Museo Europeo dei Trasporti Ogliari in Ranco on the Italian shore of Lake Maggiore.

== See also ==
- List of mountain railways in Switzerland
- List of narrow-gauge railways in Switzerland

== Bibliography ==
- Buckley, R.J. (1984). Tramways and Light Railways of Switzerland and Austria. Light Rail Transit Association. ISBN 0-900433-96-5.
- Dougherty, Hugh (March–April 2005). "The Full Monte". Narrow Gauge World. Atlantic Publishers.
- Eisenbahnatlas Schweiz. Verlag Schweers + Wall GmbH. 2012. ISBN 978-3-89494-130-7.
