= Generoso Vetta railway station =

Railway station in Switzerland

Generoso Vetta
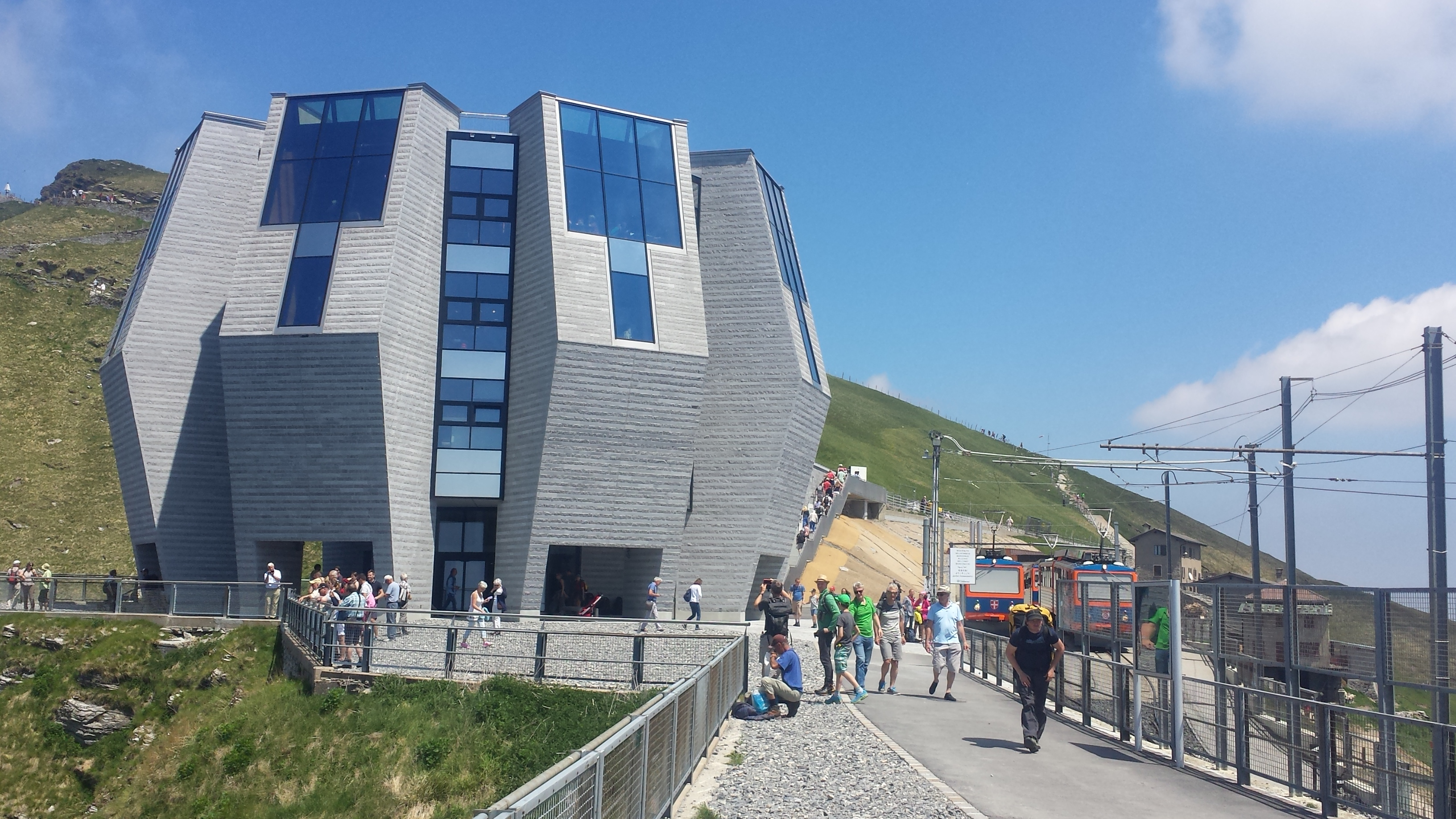
- The station with the new station building

General information
- Location: Monte Generoso; Castel San Pietro, Ticino; Switzerland
- Coordinates: 45.927767°N 9.018724°E
- Elevation: 1,592 m (5,223 ft)
- Operator: Monte Generoso railway
- Line: Monte Generoso railway
Location
- Location within Switzerland

Generoso Vetta is the upper terminal railway station of the Monte Generoso railway, a rack railway that connects Capolago with the summit of Monte Generoso in the Swiss canton of Ticino. At 1,592 metres above sea level, it is the highest railway station in Ticino. The station is situated a short walk from the mountain summit, and only a few metres from the international border with the Italian region of Lombardy.

The old station building, which had a buffet, a restaurant and a hotel, closed at the end of the 2013 season and was demolished. A new building, designed by Mario Botta and including buffet, restaurant and rooftop viewing gallery, opened on 8 April 2017. In the meantime, the railway remained closed to passengers although it was used for the transport of construction materials and workers. The new building is known as the Fiore di Pietra or stone flower.

The station is served by the following passenger trains:

Operator	Train Type	Route	Typical Frequency	Notes
Monte Generoso railway		Capolago Lago - Capolago-Riva San Vitale - San Nicolao - Bellavista - Generoso Vetta	9 per day; hourly	Operates in summer only; only 1 train per day between Capolago Lago and Capolago-Riva San Vitale
