= Monte Generoso =

Mountain in Switzerland

- Calvagione
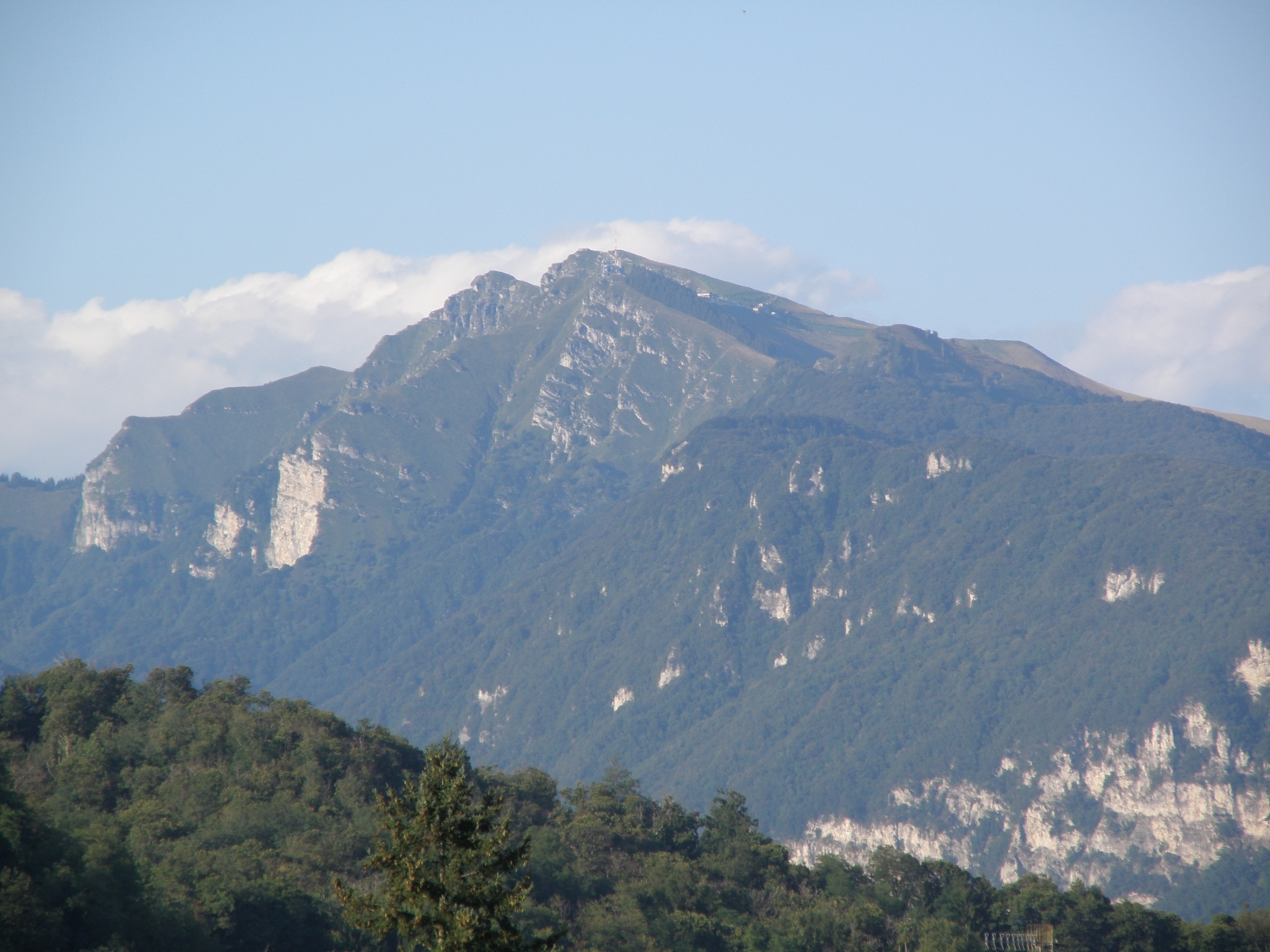
- Monte Generoso, as seen from Cantello in Italy

Highest point
- Elevation: 1,701 m (5,581 ft)
- Prominence: 1,321 m (4,334 ft)
- Isolation: 14.4 km (8.9 mi)
- Listing: Mountains of Switzerland; Mountains of Ticino
- Coordinates: 45°55′52.5″N 9°01′12″E

Geography
- Location within Alps
- Location: Ticino, Switzerland; Lombardy, Italy
- Parent range: Lugano Prealps

Climbing
- Easiest route: Hike or Monte Generoso Railway

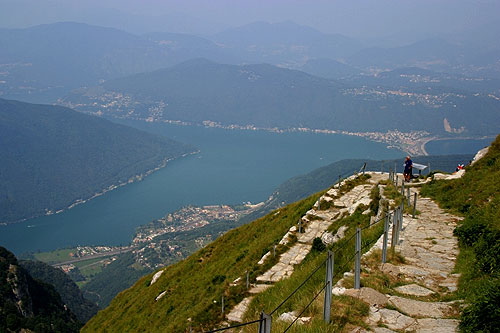
View to the north from Monte Generoso showing Lake Lugano and Melide

Monte Generoso (also known as Calvagione) is a mountain of the Lugano Prealps, located on the border between Switzerland and Italy and between Lake Lugano and Lake Como. The western and southern flanks of the mountain lie in the Swiss canton of Ticino, whilst the north-eastern flanks are in the Italian region of Lombardy.

The view from the summit of the mountain encompasses the lakes of Lugano, Como, Varese and Maggiore. To the north are the Alps, stretching from the Matterhorn via the Jungfrau and the Saint-Gotthard Massif to the Bernina Range. To the south are the Lombardy Plains and the Po Valley, with the city of Milan and the Apennine Mountains visible on a clear day.

The summit can be approached by the Monte Generoso Railway, a rack railway that starts from Capolago in Switzerland, and climbs via the western flank of the mountain. The summit station includes a panoramic terrace and buffet, a restaurant and a hotel. The new restaurant Fiore di pietra (stone flower) designed by the architect Mario Botta was inaugurated on 29 March 2017. A paved path links the railway's summit station to the summit proper, a distance of approximately 350 metres (1,150 ft) and a difference in altitude of about 100 metres (330 ft).

There is road access from Mendrisio in Switzerland to Bellavista, some 3 kilometres (1.9 mi) from the summit and an intermediate station on the railway. Hiking trails reach the summit from different starting points, including Bellavista, Capolago and Mendrisio.

Before its dismantlement in 2021, the Monte Generoso Observatory was located adjacent to the railway's summit station, where it was operated by the Monte Generoso Insubrica Astronomy Group. Also nearby is a small chapel dating from the 20th century.

The area is included in the Federal Inventory of Landscapes and Natural Monuments. The mountain slopes are home to a herd of between 300 and 350 chamois.

The artist and author Edward Lear spent summers from 1878 to 1883 on the mountain. His oil painting The Plains of Lombardy from Monte Generoso is in the Ashmolean Museum in the English city of Oxford.

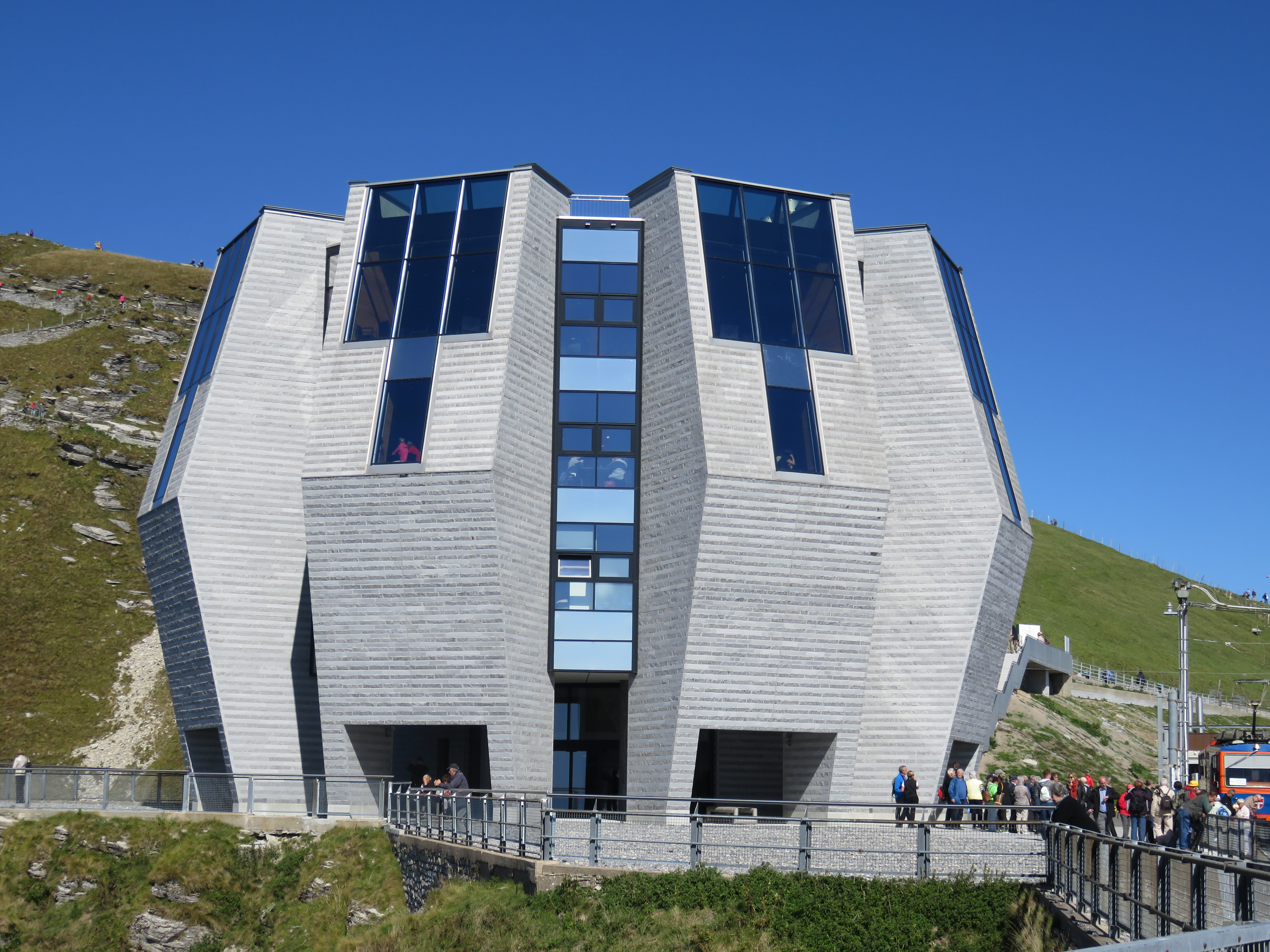
The Fiore di Pietra restaurant (Mario Botta)

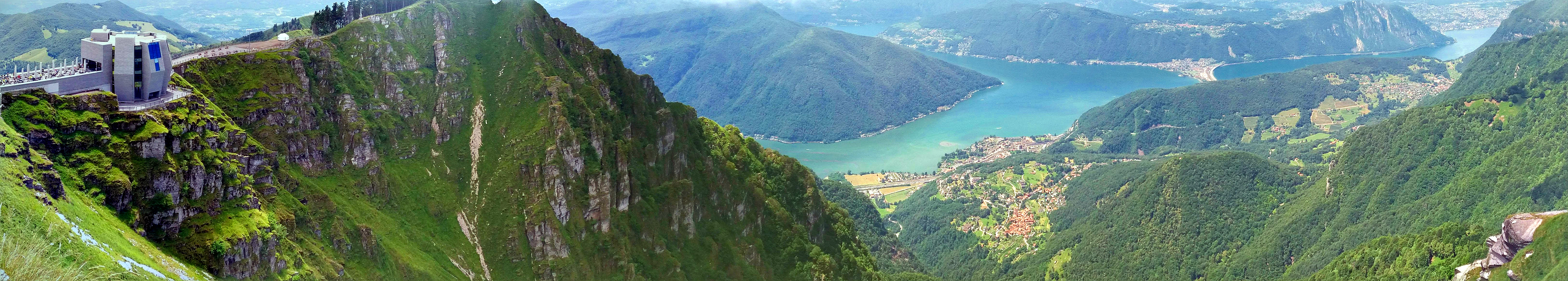
Monte Generoso panorama, 2017

== See also ==
- Monte Generoso railway
- List of mountains of Switzerland accessible by public transport
