= 800 mm gauge railways =

800 mm gauge railways are narrow-gauge railways built to a track gauge of 800 mm (2 ft 7 1/2 in).

Whilst this gauge is uncommon amongst adhesion railways, some of the world's best known rack railways are built to it. Six of these are in Switzerland, including the world's steepest rack line (the Pilatus Railway) and the world's longest pure rack line (the Wengernalp Railway), whilst the United Kingdom's only rack railway (the Snowdon Mountain Railway) is also to this gauge. A few funicular railways are also built to this gauge.

== Installations ==
Country/territory	Railway
Germany	Ernstbahn (defunct adhesion railway); Museumsfeldbahn Leipzig-Lindenau (preserved adhesion railway); Zahnradbahn Zuckerfabrik Schulau (defunct rack railway)
Japan	Kurama-dera Cable (funicular)
Norway	Mågelibanen (funicular)
Poland	Kolej Jabłonowska (defunct adhesion railway); Kolej Wilanowska (regauged to 1,000 mm (3 ft 3 3/8 in) in 1936; defunct); Marecka Kolej Dojazdowa (regauged to 750 mm (2 ft 5 1/2 in) in 1951; defunct adhesion railway)
Romania	Waldbahn Moldovița (regauged to 760 mm (2 ft 5 15/16 in) in 1909)
Switzerland	Brienz–Rothorn railway (rack railway); Monte Generoso railway (rack railway); Montreux–Glion–Rochers-de-Naye railway (rack railway); Parsenn funicular (funicular); Pilatus railway (rack railway); Riffelalp tram (adhesion tramway); Schynige Platte railway (rack railway); Wengernalp railway (rack railway)
United Kingdom	Snowdon Mountain Railway (rack railway); Trafalgar Colliery tramway, Forest of Dean (Note: Three small tank engines, Free Miner, Trafalgar and The Brothers, were built by the Lilleshall Company from 1865.)

== See also ==
- List of track gauges
