= Riazzino railway station =

Swiss railway station

Riazzino
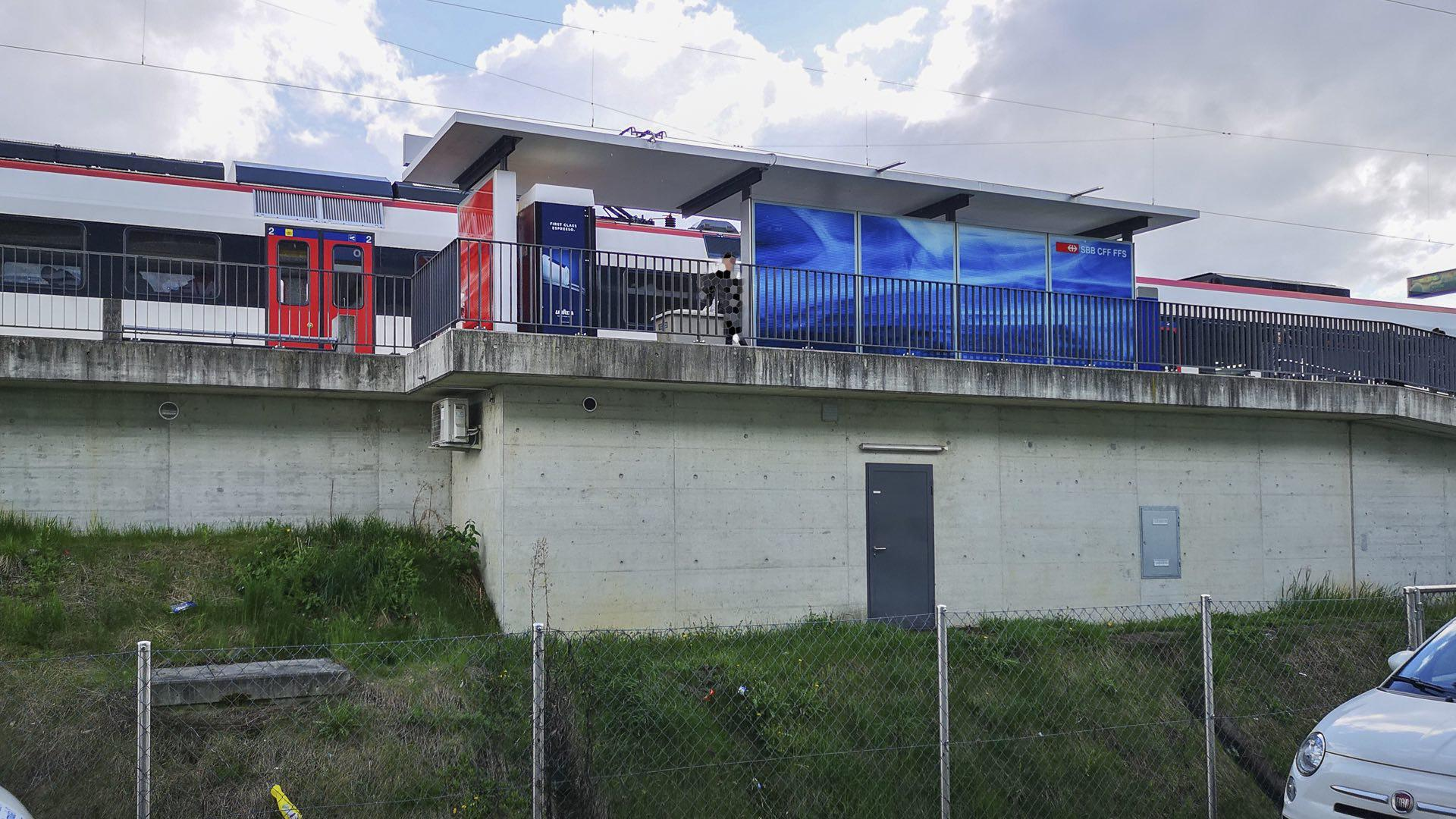
- The station in 2018

General information
- Location: Locarno; Switzerland
- Coordinates: 46°10′31″N 8°53′11″E
- Elevation: 201 m (659 ft)
- Owner: Swiss Federal Railways
- Line: Giubiasco–Locarno line
- Distance: 164.9 km (102.5 mi) from Immensee
- Train operators: Treni Regionali Ticino Lombardia
- Connections: Autopostale buses lines

Other information
- Fare zone: 310 (arcobaleno)

History
- Opened: 14 December 2008

Passengers
- 2018: 670 per weekday

Services
Preceding station	TiLo	Following station
Gordola towards Locarno	RE80	Cadenazzo towards Milano Centrale
Gordola towards Locarno	S20	Cadenazzo towards Castione-Arbedo
Location

Riazzino railway station (Italian: Stazione di Riazzino) is a railway station in the municipality of Locarno, in the Swiss canton of Ticino. It is an intermediate stop on the standard gauge Giubiasco–Locarno line of Swiss Federal Railways. The station opened at the end of 2008, replacing the former stop at Riazzino-Cugnasco.

== Services ==
As of the December 2021 timetable change, the following services stop at Riazzino:

- RE80: half-hourly service between Locarno and Chiasso and hourly service to Milano Centrale.
- S20: half-hourly service between Locarno and Castione-Arbedo.
