= Gordola railway station =

Swiss railway station

Gordola
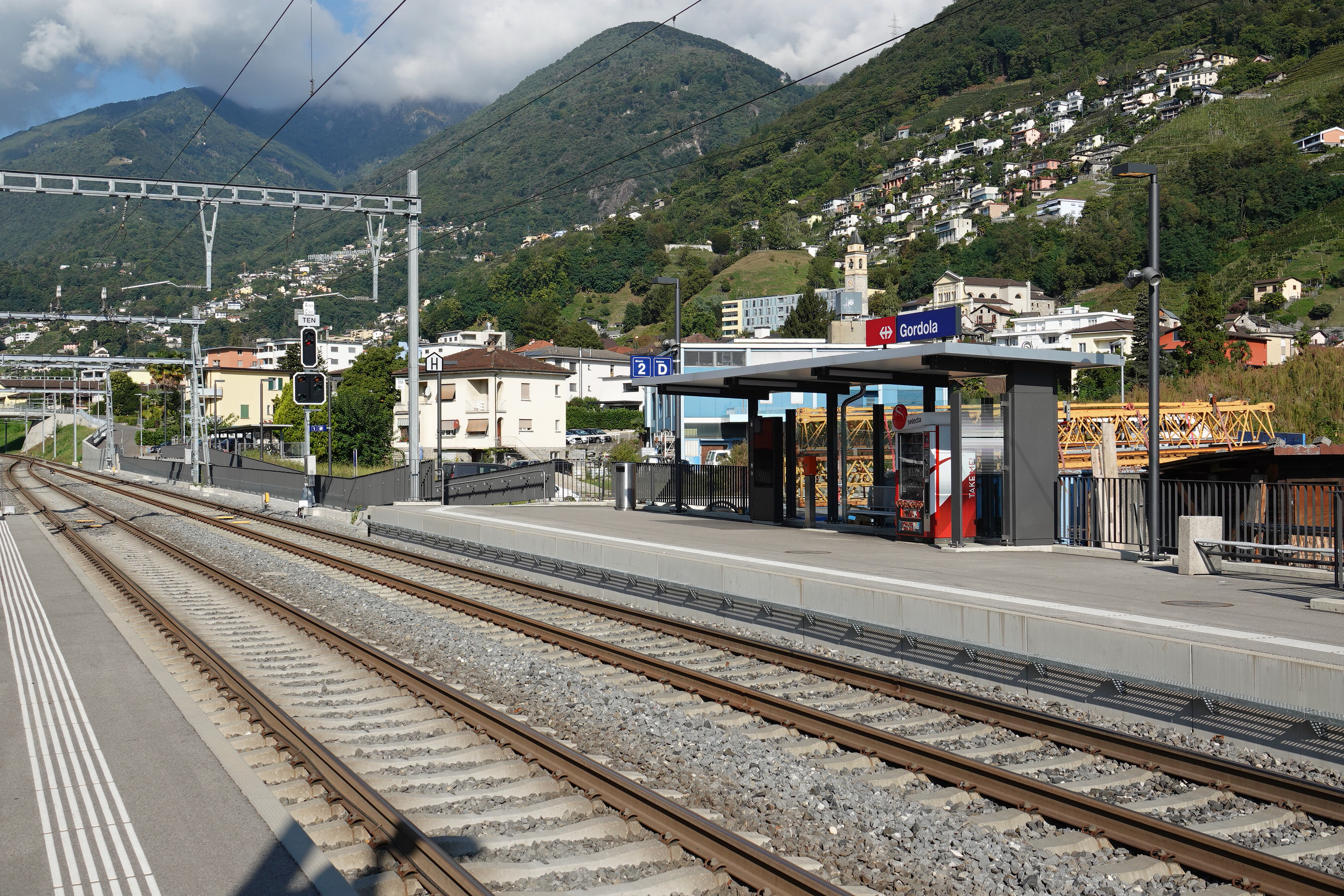
- Gordola station in 2022

General information
- Location: Gordola; Switzerland
- Coordinates: 46°10′45″N 8°51′57″E
- Elevation: 203 m (666 ft)
- Owner: Swiss Federal Railways
- Line: Giubiasco–Locarno line
- Train operators: Treni Regionali Ticino Lombardia

Other information
- Fare zone: 310 (arcobaleno)

Passengers
- 2018: 780 per weekday

Services
Preceding station	TiLo	Following station
Tenero towards Locarno	RE80	Riazzino towards Milano Centrale
Tenero towards Locarno	S20	Riazzino towards Castione-Arbedo
Location

Gordola railway station (Italian: Stazione di Gordola) is a railway station in the municipality of Gordola, in the Swiss canton of Ticino. It is an intermediate stop on the standard gauge Giubiasco–Locarno line of Swiss Federal Railways. The present station was rebuilt in 2019, with a new platform 200 metres (660 ft) east of the old station.

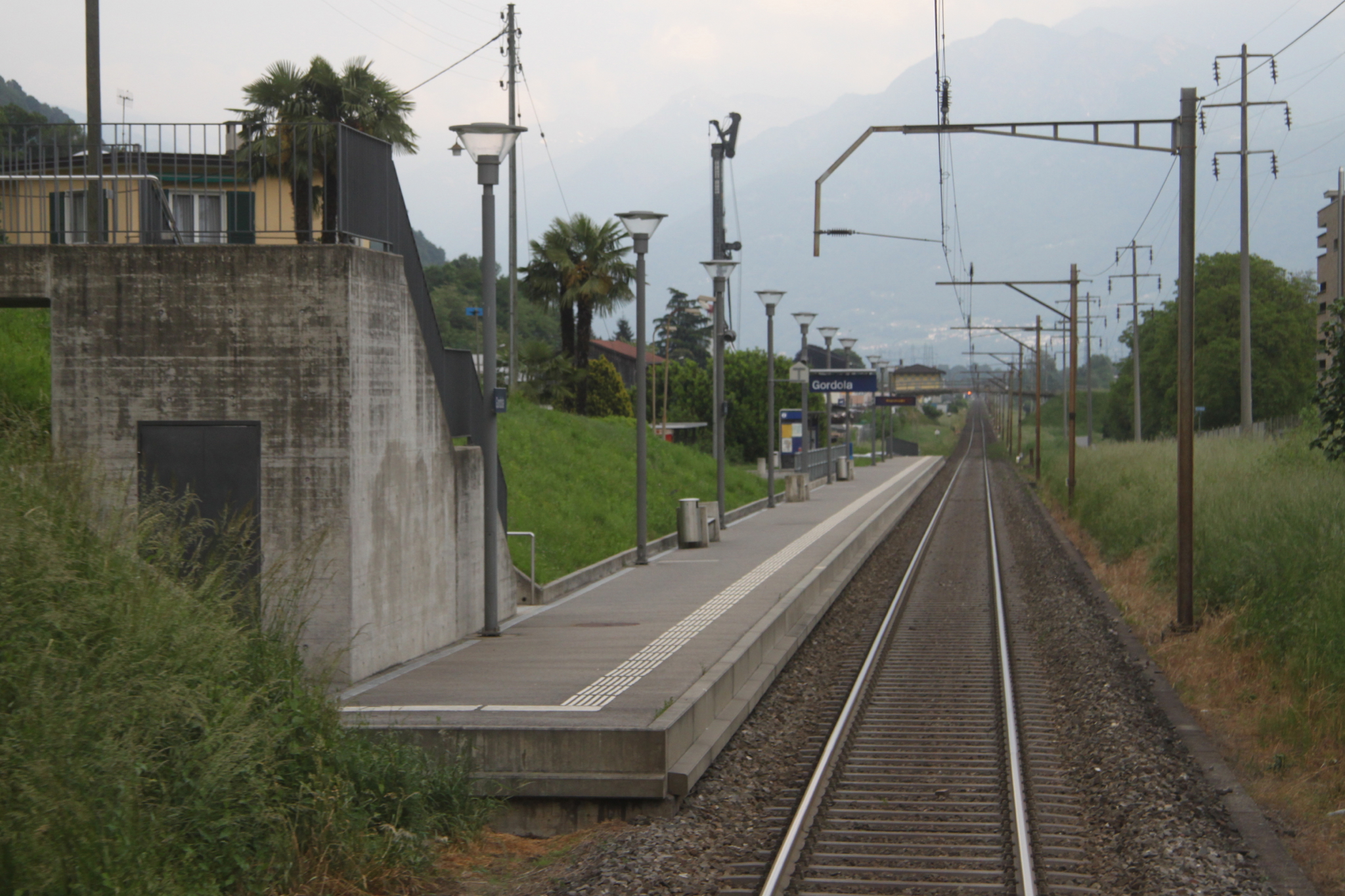
Station before transformation (2015)

== Services ==
As of the December 2021 timetable change, the following services stop at Gordola:

- RE80: half-hourly service between Locarno and Chiasso and hourly service to Milano Centrale.
- S20: half-hourly service between Locarno and Castione-Arbedo.
