= Cadenazzo railway station =

Railway station in Ticino, Switzerland

Cadenazzo
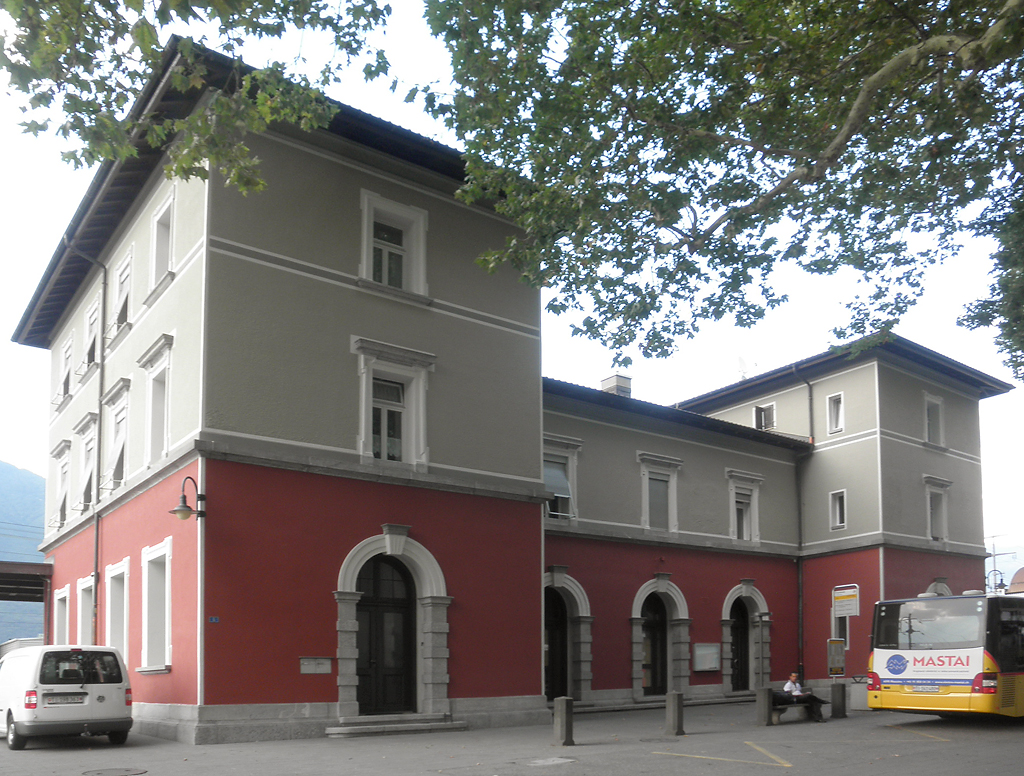
- The station building in 2012

General information
- Location: Cadenazzo; Switzerland
- Coordinates: 46°09′09″N 8°56′30″E
- Elevation: 208 m (682 ft)
- Owner: Swiss Federal Railways
- Lines: Cadenazzo–Luino line; Giubiasco–Locarno line
- Distance: 159.5 km (99.1 mi) from Immensee
- Train operators: Südostbahn; Treni Regionali Ticino Lombardia
- Connections: Autopostale buses

Other information
- Fare zone: 210 and 310 (arcobaleno)

History
- Opened: 20 December 1874
- Electrified: 15 May 1936

Passengers
- 2018: 1,800 per weekday

Services
Preceding station	Südostbahn	Following station
Tenero towards Locarno	IR 26	Giubiasco towards Basel SBB
Tenero towards Locarno	IR 46	Giubiasco towards Zürich Hauptbahnhof
Preceding station	TiLo	Following station
Riazzino towards Locarno	RE80	Sant'Antonino towards Milano Centrale
Riazzino towards Locarno	S20	Sant'Antonino towards Castione-Arbedo
Terminus	S30	Quartino towards Gallarate
Location

Cadenazzo railway station (Italian: Stazione di Cadenazzo) is a railway station in the municipality of Cadenazzo, in the Swiss canton of Ticino. It is located at the junction of the standard gauge Cadenazzo–Luino and Giubiasco–Locarno lines of Swiss Federal Railways.

== Services ==
As of the December 2021 timetable change, the following services stop at Cadenazzo:

- InterRegio: hourly service between Locarno and Arth-Goldau; trains continue to Basel SBB or Zürich Hauptbahnhof.
- RE80: half-hourly service between Locarno and Chiasso and hourly service to Milano Centrale.
- S20: half-hourly service between Locarno and Castione-Arbedo.
- S30: service every two hours to Luino or Gallarate.
