= Tenero railway station =

Swiss railway station

Tenero
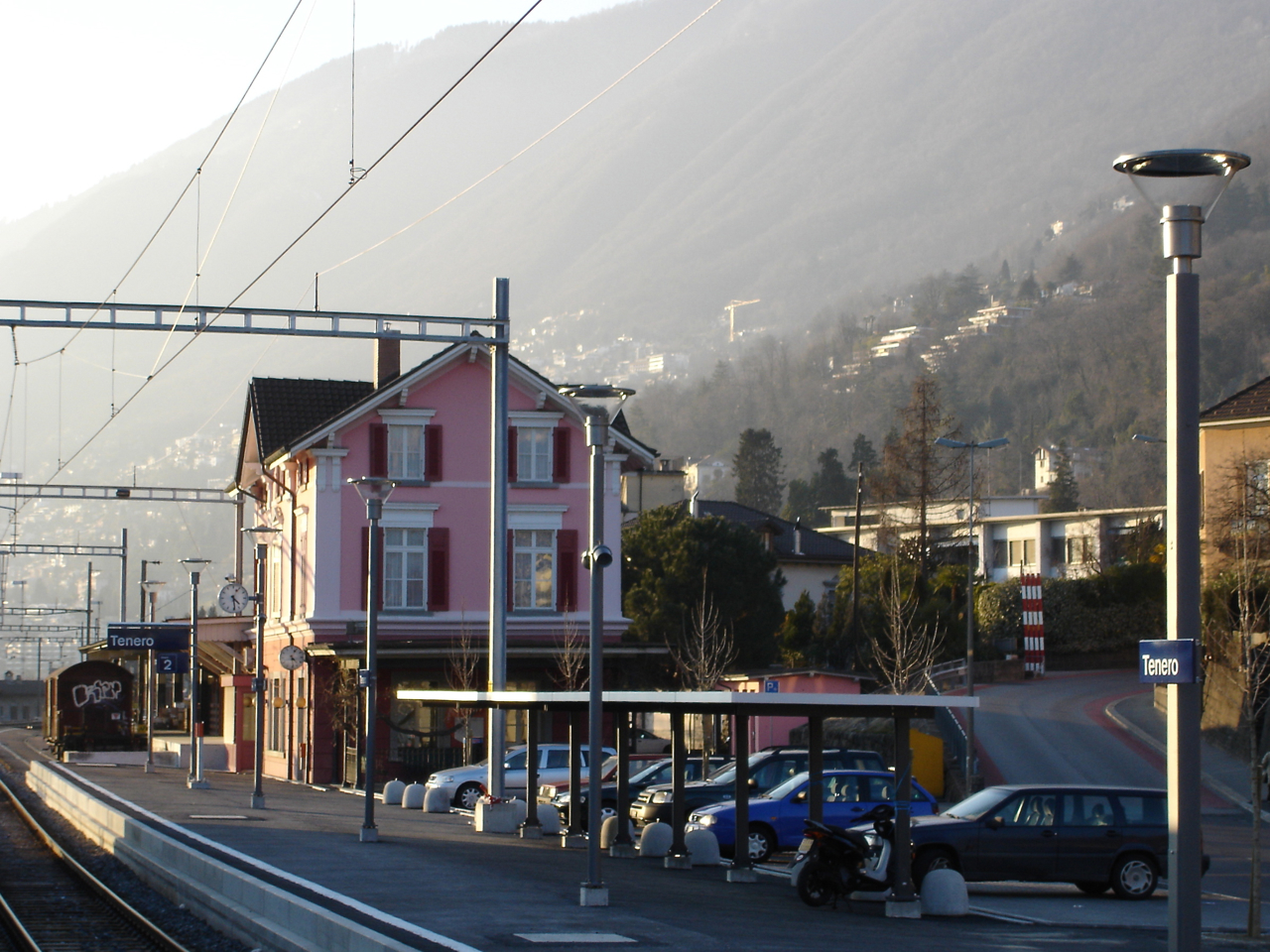
- The station in 2005

General information
- Location: Tenero-Contra; Switzerland
- Coordinates: 46°10′39″N 8°51′01″E
- Elevation: 203 m (666 ft)
- Owner: Swiss Federal Railways
- Line: Giubiasco–Locarno line
- Distance: 167.8 km (104.3 mi) from Immensee
- Train operators: Südostbahn; Treni Regionali Ticino Lombardia
- Connections: Autopostale and FART buses

Other information
- Fare zone: 310 (arcobaleno)

Passengers
- 2018: 1,600 per weekday

Services
Preceding station	Südostbahn	Following station
Locarno Terminus	IR 26	Cadenazzo towards Basel SBB
Locarno Terminus	IR 46	Cadenazzo towards Zürich Hauptbahnhof
Preceding station	TiLo	Following station
Minusio towards Locarno	RE80	Gordola towards Milano Centrale
Minusio towards Locarno	S20	Gordola towards Castione-Arbedo
Location

Tenero railway station (Italian: Stazione di Tenero) is a railway station in the municipality of Tenero-Contra, in the Swiss canton of Ticino. It is an intermediate stop on the standard gauge Giubiasco–Locarno line of Swiss Federal Railways.

== Services ==
As of the December 2021 timetable change, the following services stop at Tenero:

- InterRegio: hourly service between Locarno and Arth-Goldau; trains continue to Basel SBB or Zürich Hauptbahnhof.
- RE80: half-hourly service between Locarno and Chiasso and hourly service to Milano Centrale.
- S20: half-hourly service between Locarno and Castione-Arbedo.
