= Sant'Antonino railway station =

Swiss railway station

Sant'Antonino
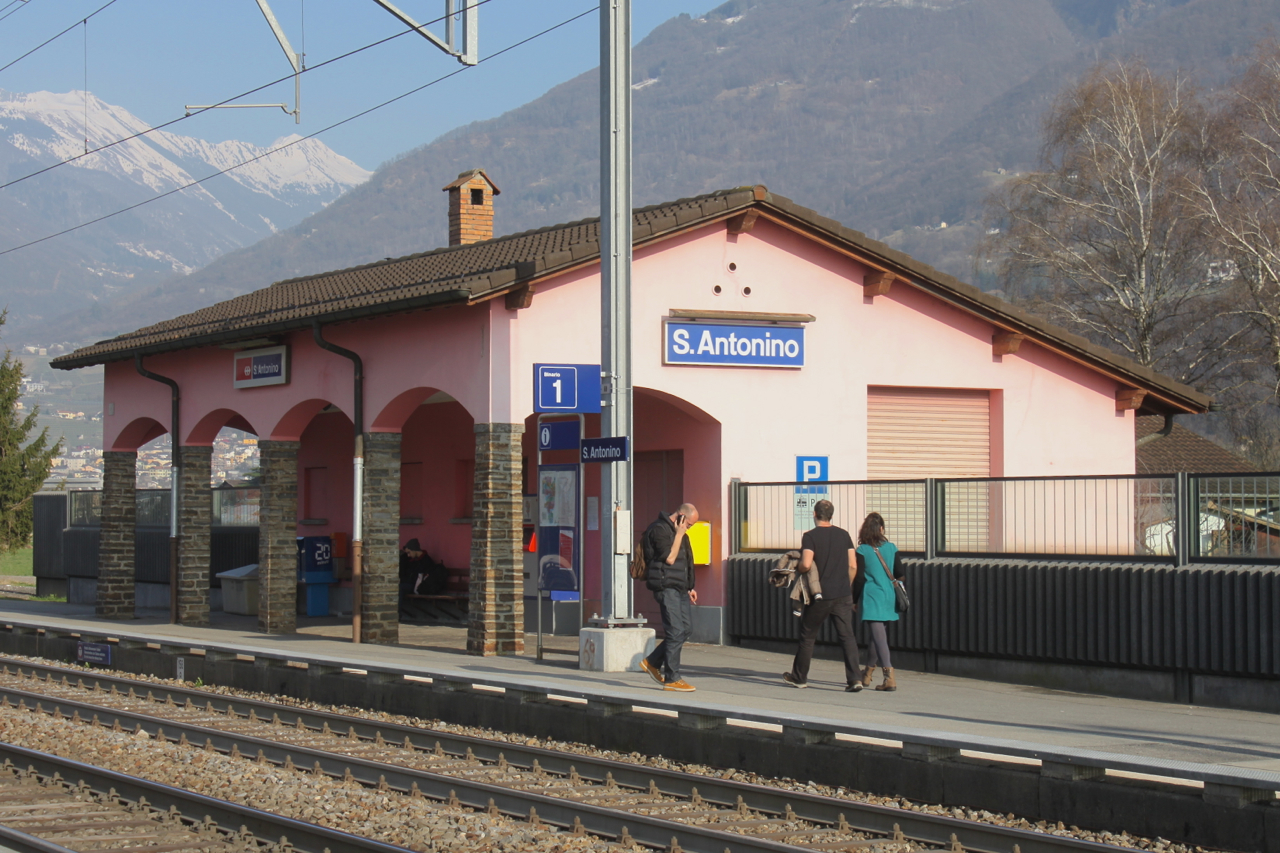
- The station in 2014

General information
- Location: Sant'Antonino; Switzerland
- Coordinates: 46°09′38″N 8°58′26″E
- Elevation: 211 m (692 ft)
- Owner: Swiss Federal Railways
- Line: Giubiasco–Locarno line
- Distance: 156.8 km (97.4 mi) from Immensee
- Train operators: Treni Regionali Ticino Lombardia
- Connections: Autopostale buses

Other information
- Fare zone: 200 and 210 (arcobaleno)

Services
Preceding station	TiLo	Following station
Cadenazzo towards Locarno	RE80	Lugano towards Milano Centrale
Cadenazzo towards Locarno	S20	Giubiasco towards Castione-Arbedo
Location

Sant'Antonino railway station (Italian: Stazione di Sant'Antonino), also called S. Antonino, is a railway station in the municipality of Sant'Antonino, in the Swiss canton of Ticino. It is an intermediate stop on the standard gauge Giubiasco–Locarno line of Swiss Federal Railways.

== Services ==
As of the December 2021 timetable change, the following services stop at Sant'Antonino:

- RE80: half-hourly service between Locarno and Chiasso and hourly service to Milano Centrale.
- S20: half-hourly service between Locarno and Castione-Arbedo.
