= Minusio railway station =

Railway station in Switzerland

Minusio

General information
- Location: Minusio; Switzerland
- Coordinates: 46°10′26″N 8°49′09″E
- Line: Giubiasco–Locarno line
- Distance: 170.5 km (105.9 mi) from Immensee
- Platforms: 2 side platforms
- Tracks: 2
- Train operators: Treni Regionali Ticino Lombardia

Construction
- Accessible: Yes

Other information
- Fare zone: 300 (arcobaleno)

History
- Opened: 10 December 2023

Services
Preceding station	TiLo	Following station
Locarno Terminus	RE80	Tenero towards Milano Centrale
Locarno Terminus	S20	Tenero towards Castione-Arbedo
Location

Minusio railway station (Italian: Stazione di Minusio) is a railway station in the municipality of Minusio, in the Swiss canton of Ticino. It is an intermediate stop on the standard gauge Giubiasco–Locarno line of Swiss Federal Railways.

== History ==
The new station was built at a cost of SFr 24.7 million, split between Minusio, the canton of Ticino, and the federal government. Much of the expenditure was for a new crossover near the station. The station was inaugurated on 5 December 2023, and began serving passengers with the timetable change that December 10.

== Layout ==
Minusio has two 291-metre (955 ft) long side platforms. Both are reached by ramps and are fully accessible.

== Services ==
As of the December 2023 timetable change, the following services stop at Minusio:

- RE80: half-hourly service between Locarno and Chiasso and hourly service to Milano Centrale.
- S20: half-hourly service between Locarno and Castione-Arbedo.
