= Arbedo-Castione =

- Municipality
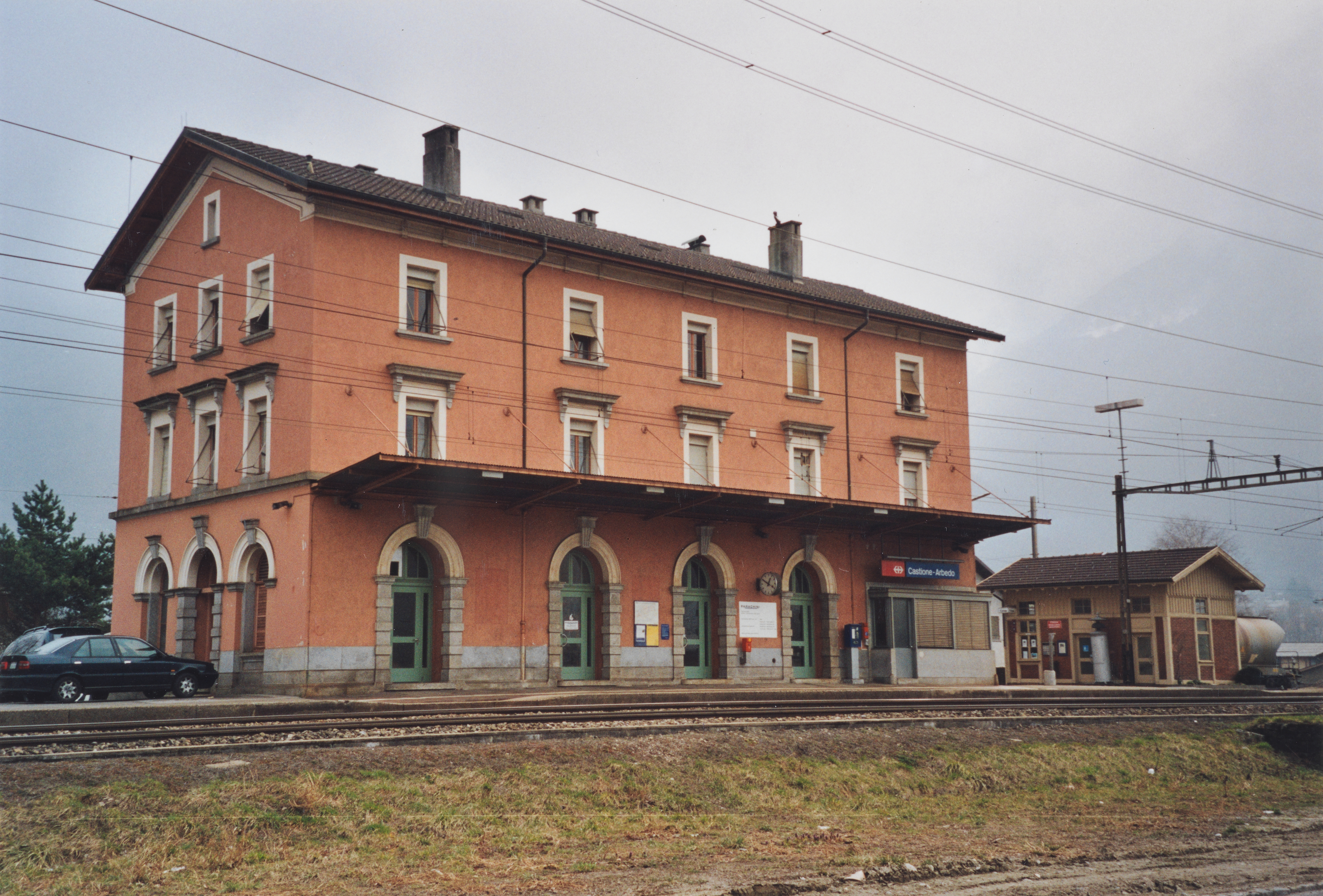

- Flag Coat of arms
- Location of Arbedo-Castione
- Location within Switzerland Location within Canton of Ticino
- Coordinates: 46°13′N 9°03′E
- Country: Switzerland
- Canton: Ticino
- District: Bellinzona

Government
  - Mayor: Sindaco

Area
  - Total: 21.28 km^{2} (8.22 sq mi)
- Elevation: 283 m (928 ft)

Population (2003)
  - Total: 3,992
  - Density: 187.6/km^{2} (485.9/sq mi)
- Time zone: UTC+01:00 (CET)
  - Summer (DST): UTC+02:00 (CEST)
- Postal code: 6517
- SFOS number: 5001
- ISO 3166 code: CH-TI
- Surrounded by: Bellinzona, Claro, Gnosca, Gorduno, Lumino, Roveredo (GR), Sant'Antonio
- Website: www.arbedocastione.ch

Arbedo-Castione is a municipality in the district of Bellinzona in the canton of Ticino in Switzerland.

== Geography ==
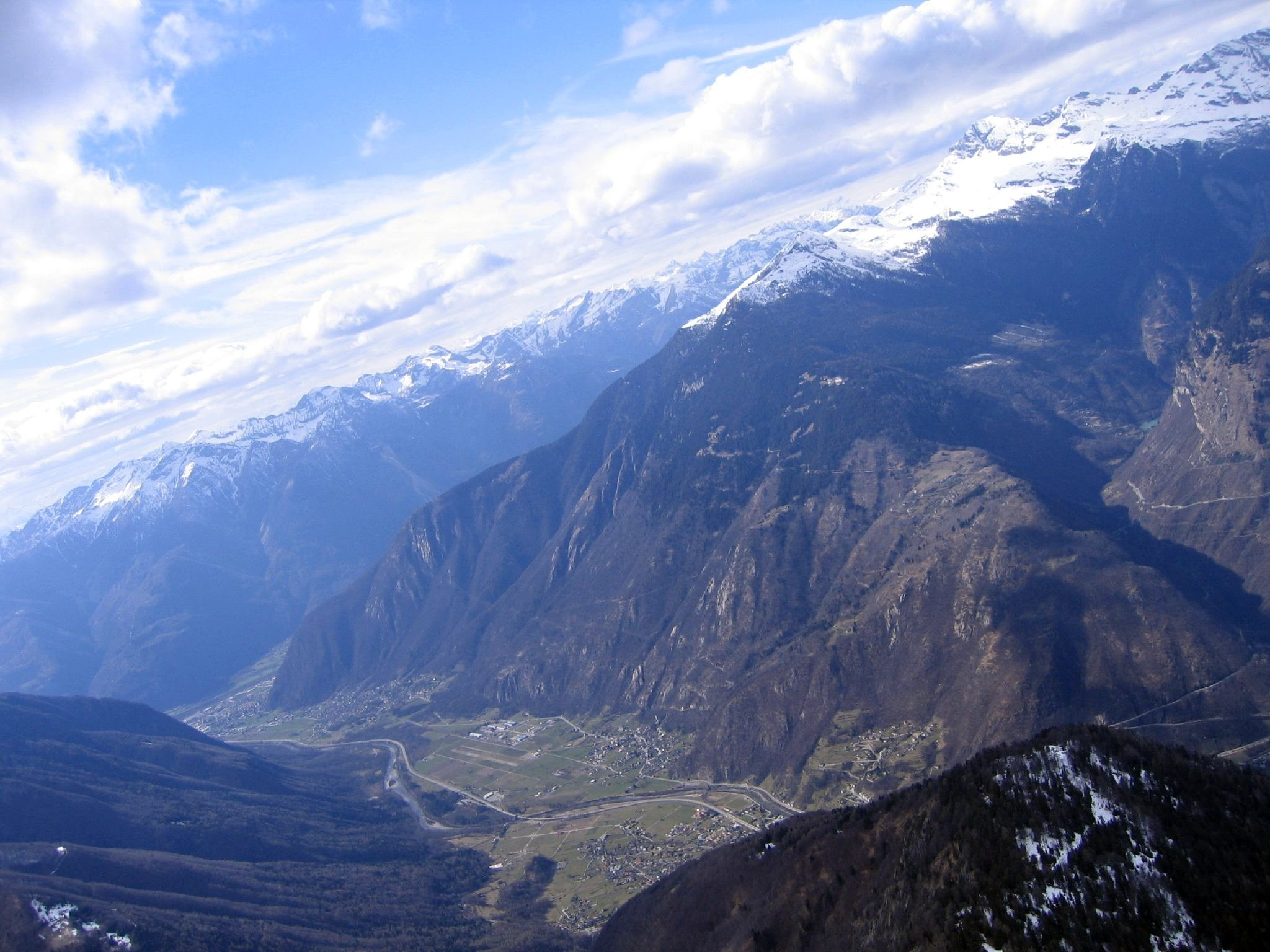
View of Roveredo, San Vittore, Lumino and Castione.

Arbedo-Castione has an area, as of 1997, of 21.28 square kilometers (8.22 sq mi). Of this area, 1.27 km^{2} (0.49 sq mi) or 6.0% is used for agricultural purposes, while 16.51 km^{2} (6.37 sq mi) or 77.6% is forested. Of the rest of the land, 1.88 km^{2} (0.73 sq mi) or 8.8% is settled (buildings or roads), 0.39 km^{2} (0.15 sq mi) or 1.8% is either rivers or lakes and 0.86 km^{2} (0.33 sq mi) or 4.0% is unproductive land.

Of the built up area, industrial buildings made up 1.8% of the total area while housing and buildings made up 2.9% and transportation infrastructure made up 2.8%. Power and water infrastructure as well as other special developed areas made up 1.3% of the area. Out of the forested land, 74.5% of the total land area is heavily forested and 1.6% is covered with orchards or small clusters of trees. Of the agricultural land, 2.6% is used for growing crops and 2.9% is used for alpine pastures. Of the water in the municipality, 0.2% is in lakes and 1.6% is in rivers and streams. Of the unproductive areas, 3.1% is unproductive vegetation.

The municipality is located in the Bellinzona district on the left bank of the Moesa river near the confluence with the Tessin river, south of Piz de Molinera. It consists of the villages of Arbedo and Castione.

== Coat of arms ==
The blazon of the municipal coat of arms is Azure a Lion passant Argent holding a Palm Branch Vert between three Mullets Or on a Bridge of the last in its Arch three barrulets engrailed.

== Demographics ==
Arbedo-Castione has a population (as of December 2020) of 5,024. As of 2008, 29.5% of the population are foreign nationals. Over the last 10 years (1997–2007) the population has changed at a rate of 3.6%. Most of the population (as of 2000) speaks Italian(88.8%), with German being second most common ( 3.7%) and Serbo-Croatian being third ( 2.4%).

Of the Swiss national languages (as of 2000), 139 speak German, 43 people speak French and 3,313 people speak Italian. The remainder (234 people) speak another language.

As of 2008, the gender distribution of the population was 49.7% male and 50.3% female. The population was made up of 1,411 Swiss men (33.6% of the population), and 678 (16.1%) non-Swiss men. There were 1,583 Swiss women (37.7%), and 528 (12.6%) non-Swiss women.

In 2008 there were 22 live births to Swiss citizens and 9 births to non-Swiss citizens, and in same time span there were 22 deaths of Swiss citizens and 3 non-Swiss citizen deaths. Ignoring immigration and emigration, the population of Swiss citizens remained the same while the foreign population increased by 6. There was 1 Swiss man, 1 Swiss woman who emigrated from Switzerland to another country, 31 non-Swiss men who emigrated from Switzerland to another country and 15 non-Swiss women who emigrated from Switzerland to another country. The total Swiss population change in 2008 (from all sources) was an increase of 62 and the non-Swiss population change was an increase of 53 people. This represents a population growth rate of 2.9%.

The age distribution, as of 2009, in Arbedo-Castione is; 387 children or 9.2% of the population are between 0 and 9 years old and 411 teenagers or 9.8% are between 10 and 19. Of the adult population, 492 people or 11.7% of the population are between 20 and 29 years old. 549 people or 13.1% are between 30 and 39, 742 people or 17.7% are between 40 and 49, and 612 people or 14.6% are between 50 and 59. The senior population distribution is 500 people or 11.9% of the population are between 60 and 69 years old, 338 people or 8.0% are between 70 and 79, there are 169 people or 4.0% who are between 80 and 89.

As of 2000, there were 1,452 private households in the municipality, and an average of 2.5 persons per household. In 2000 there were 695 single family homes (or 74.3% of the total) out of a total of 935 inhabited buildings. There were 120 two family buildings (12.8%) and 87 multi-family buildings (9.3%). There were also 33 buildings in the municipality that were multipurpose buildings (used for both housing and commercial or another purpose).

The vacancy rate for the municipality, in 2008, was 0.91%. Of the apartments, a total of 1,431 apartments (88.4% of the total) were permanently occupied, while 107 apartments (6.6%) were seasonally occupied and 80 apartments (4.9%) were empty. In 2000 there were 1,618 apartments in the municipality. The most common apartment size was the 4 room apartment of which there were 626. There were 62 single room apartments and 384 apartments with five or more rooms. As of 2007, the construction rate of new housing units was 9.7 new units per 1000 residents.

The historical population is given in the following table:

year	population
1801	420
1836	565
1850	801
1900	1,042
1950	1,335
2000	3,729

== Heritage sites of national significance ==
The Church of S. Paolo detta Chiesa Rossa is listed as a Swiss heritage site of national significance.

== Politics ==
In the 2007 federal election the most popular party was the FDP which received 30.47% of the vote. The next three most popular parties were the SP (22.37%), the CVP (19.66%) and the Ticino League (14.3%). In the federal election, a total of 1,080 votes were cast, and the voter turnout was 46.6%.

In the 2007 Ticino Gran Consiglio election, there were a total of 2,312 registered voters in Arbedo-Castione, of which 1,584 or 68.5% voted. 23 blank ballots and 3 null ballots were cast, leaving 1,558 valid ballots in the election. The most popular party was the PLRT which received 368 or 23.6% of the vote. The next three most popular parties were; the SSI (with 365 or 23.4%), the PS (with 270 or 17.3%) and the LEGA (with 226 or 14.5%).

In the 2007 Ticino Consiglio di Stato election, there were 13 blank ballots and 6 null ballots, which left 1,566 valid ballots in the election. The most popular party was the PLRT which received 333 or 21.3% of the vote. The next three most popular parties were; the PS (with 329 or 21.0%), the LEGA (with 314 or 20.1%) and the SSI (with 311 or 19.9%).

== Economy ==
As of 2007, Arbedo-Castione had an unemployment rate of 4.81%. As of 2005, there were 23 people employed in the primary economic sector and about 10 businesses involved in this sector. 393 people are employed in the secondary sector and there are 42 businesses in this sector. 788 people are employed in the tertiary sector, with 93 businesses in this sector.

There were 1,767 residents of the municipality who were employed in some capacity, of which females made up 38.5% of the workforce. In 2000, there were 439 workers who commuted into the municipality and 1,350 workers who commuted away. The municipality is a net exporter of workers, with about 3.1 workers leaving the municipality for every one entering. About 6.6% of the workforce coming into Arbedo-Castione are coming from outside Switzerland.

Of the working population, 11.1% used public transportation to get to work, and 64.2% used a private car.

As of 2009, there was one hotel in Arbedo-Castione.

== Religion ==
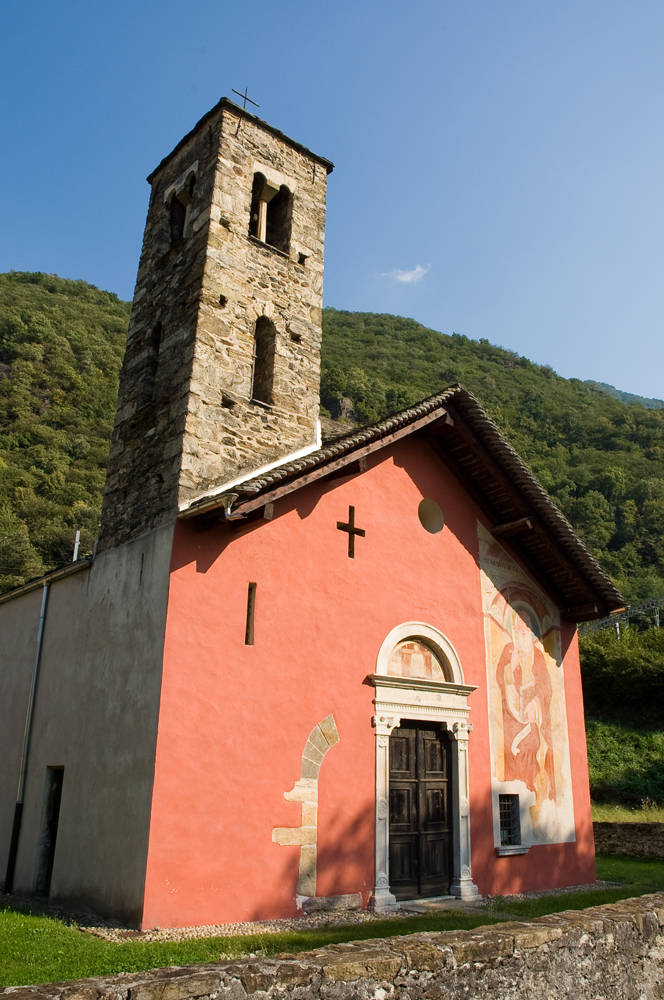
The church of San Paolo also known as Chiesa Rossa

From the 2000 census, 2,961 or 79.4% were Roman Catholic, while 156 or 4.2% belonged to the Swiss Reformed Church. There are 461 individuals (or about 12.36% of the population) who belong to another church (not listed on the census), and 151 individuals (or about 4.05% of the population) did not answer the question.

== Education ==
The entire Swiss population is generally well educated. In Arbedo-Castione about 58.1% of the population (between age 25-64) have completed either non-mandatory upper secondary education or additional higher education (either university or a Fachhochschule).

In Arbedo-Castione there are a total of 682 students (as of 2009). The Ticino education system provides up to three years of non-mandatory kindergarten and in Arbedo-Castione there are 126 children in kindergarten.

The primary school program lasts for five years and includes both a standard school and a special school. In the municipality, 163 students attend the standard primary schools and 15 students attend the special school. In the lower secondary school system, students either attend a two-year middle school followed by a two-year pre-apprenticeship or they attend a four-year program to prepare for higher education. There are 162 students in the two-year middle school and 1 in their pre-apprenticeship, while 73 students are in the four-year advanced program.

The upper secondary school includes several options, but at the end of the upper secondary program, a student will be prepared to enter a trade or to continue on to a university or college. In Ticino, vocational students may either attend school while working on their internship or apprenticeship (which takes three or four years) or may attend school followed by an internship or apprenticeship (which takes one year as a full-time student or one and a half to two years as a part-time student). There are 35 vocational students who are attending school full-time and 92 who attend part-time.

The professional program lasts three years and prepares a student for a job in engineering, nursing, computer science, business, tourism and similar fields. There are 15 students in the professional program.

As of 2000, there were 299 students in Arbedo-Castione who came from another municipality, while 165 residents attended schools outside the municipality.

== Transport ==
Arbedo-Castione is served by the Castione-Arbedo station, situated within the municipality. The station is on the Gotthard railway and the Ferrovia Mesolcinese tourist railway.
