= Piz de Molinera =

Mountain in Switzerland

- Location within Switzerland

Highest point
- Elevation: 2,288 m (7,507 ft)
- Prominence: 113 m (371 ft)
- Parent peak: Torent Alto
- Coordinates: 46°16′39.7″N 9°03′44″E

Geography
- Location: Switzerland
- Parent range: Lepontine Alps

Piz de Molinera is a mountain in the Lepontine Alps, located on the border between the cantons of Ticino and Graubünden. It overlooks the junction of the Ticino and the Moesa, north of Arbedo (Ticino).
