= Bellinzona–Mesocco railway =

Former railway line in Switzerland

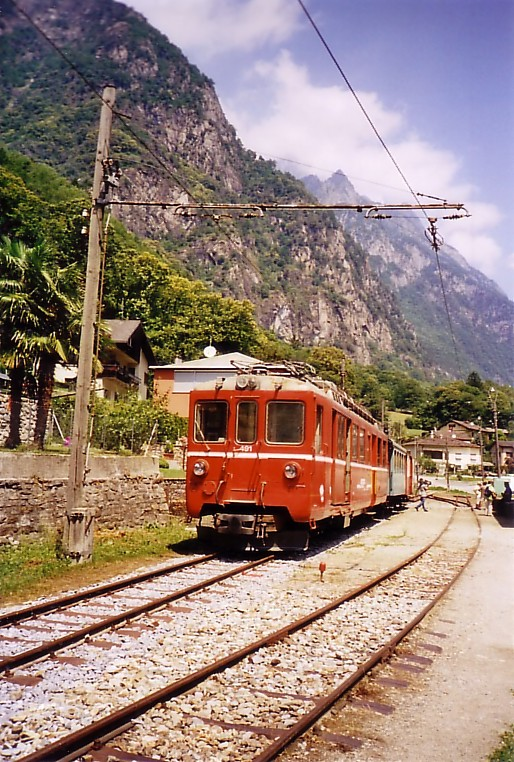
- Train at Cama in 2007

Overview
- Status: Partially closed and removed
- Locale: Cantons of Ticino and Graubünden, Switzerland
- Termini: Bellinzona; Mesocco
- Stations: 17

History
- Opened: 1907
- Closed: 1972 (Bellinzona–Castione); 1978 (Cama–Mesocco); 2013 (Castione - Cama)

Technical
- Line length: -1972: 31.3 kilometres (19.4 mi) -2013: 12.7 kilometres (7.9 mi)
- Track gauge: 1,000 mm (3 ft 3 3/8 in)
- Minimum radius: 80 metres (260 ft)
- Electrification: 1500 V, DC, overhead
- Maximum incline: 6‰

The Bellinzona–Mesocco railway (Italian: Ferrovia Bellinzona–Mesocco; BM) was a Swiss metre gauge railway that linked the towns of Bellinzona, in the canton of Ticino, and Mesocco, in the canton of Graubünden. The line was built by the Società Anonima della Ferrovia Elettrica Bellinzona-Mesocco and later became part of the Rhaetian Railway. Before complete closure, the section of the line between Castione-Arbedo, and Cama was operated by the Società Esercizio Ferroviario Turistico (SEFT) as a tourist railway known as the Ferrovia Mesolcinese.

== Project and construction ==
The Gotthard railway opened in 1882, providing a transport link to the communities of the valley of the Ticino River. In order to provide a link to the communities of the Val Mesolcina, a concession for the Bellinzona–Mesocco railway a committee was formed in 1891, which led to a concession being granted in 1899. The tributaries of the Moesa river carry large quantities of rock, which historically had occasionally dammed the Moesa and changed its course. The route had to be chosen for resilience to this risk, resulting in an initial estimate of CHF2.7 million. Raising the capital proved difficult, so the budget was very tight. As a consequence, although intended as a feeder line to the Gotthard railway, the Bellinzona terminus of the BM was located some 500 metres (1,600 ft) from the main line station, and the main transfer point was Castione-Arbedo station further north. The original line was 31.284 kilometres (19.439 mi) long, and rises 538.4 m (1,766 ft), mostly in the last 7 km (4.3 mi) after Cabbiolo. There were 17 stops, a maximum gradient of 60‰ and a minimum radius of 80 metres (260 ft). 160,000 cubic metres (5,700,000 ft^{3}) of earthworks, four short tunnels and 27 bridges were required.

== Operations ==
AC traction being still in its infancy, the line was electrified at 1500 V DC using overhead lines. A power station was built at Cebbia, using two Pelton wheels powering 1500kVAC and 10kVAC generators. The AC power was transmitted to Roveredo, where it was converted to DC.

Initially, six 240-horsepower (180 kW) passenger railcars were procured. With a gross weight of 34 tons, they could haul 50t up the 60‰ ruling gradient at nearly 20 km/h (12 mph). There were also similar goods railcars, four four-wheeled carriages and 28 four-wheeled goods wagons. In 1942 the line was merged into the RhB, without a physical connection, and in 1956 new railcars interchangeable with the Chur–Arosa railway were introduced.

In 1955, a transfer station for standard gauge wagons was installed at Castione-Arbedo.

=== San Bernardino railway project ===
An extension under the San Bernardino Pass to Thusis was planned, in order to provide a rail connection to the Rhaetian Railway (RhB).

== Decline and closure ==
In 1972, all passenger traffic ceased and the line between Bellinzona and Castione-Arbedo was closed, whilst freight traffic continued on the rest of the line. In 1978 the upper section of the line was damaged by a bad storm, and was never repaired. The remnant of the line between Castione-Arbedo and Cama continued carrying freight traffic until the closure of the factories on the line removed that traffic. In 2003, freight traffic ceased and the remaining 12.7 kilometres (7.9 mi) line was transferred to SEFT for operation as a tourist line. It was finally closed at end of 2013.

== Rolling stock ==
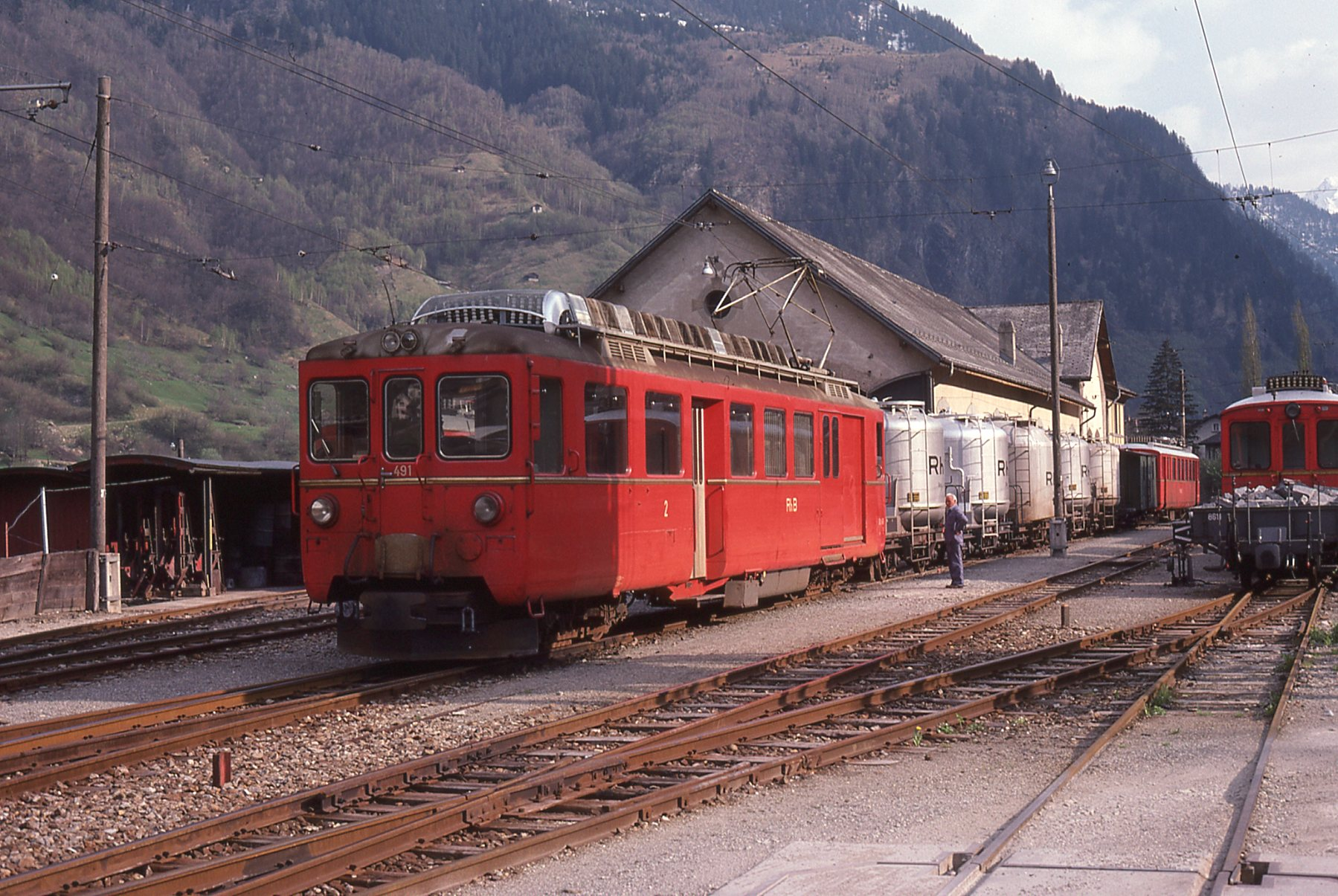
BDe 4/4 491 shunting freight wagons in Mesocco (1977)

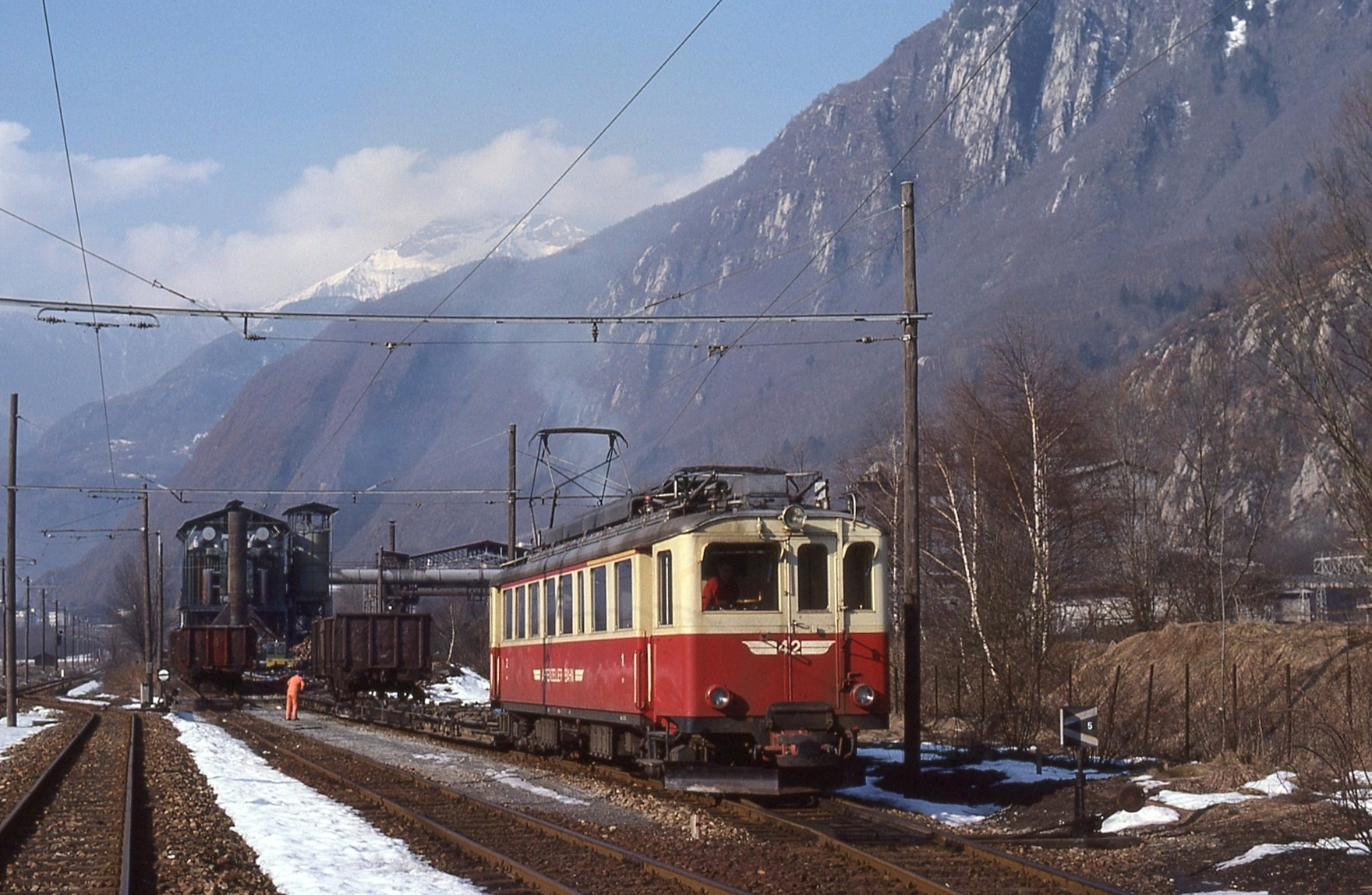
Railcar 42 shunting standard gauge wagons on Rollbocks at the Valmoesa steelworks in the 1980s

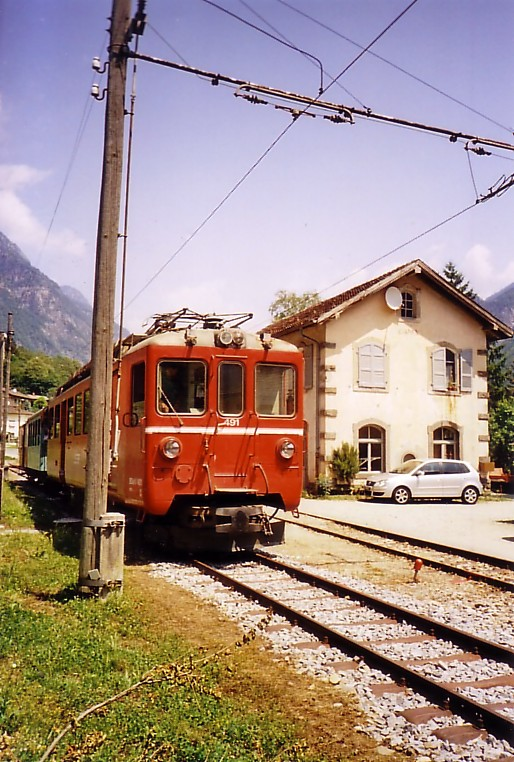
Railcar BDe 4/4 491 of the Ferrovia Mesolcinese in Cama (2006)

=== Bellinzona-Mesocco Railway between 1907 and 1942 ===
When the Bellinzona – Mesocco railway line opened in 1907, three BCe 4/4 railcars were put into operation. The cars were given the road numbers 1 to 3 and were henceforth used on the entire line. Two identical vehicles with the numbers 4 and 5 followed in 1909. An Fe 4/4 luggage railcar, number 501, was procured for freight traffic. The bodywork and chassis of all six railcars came from the Ringhoffer wagon works in Prague while the electrical part from Maschinenfabrik Rieter in Töss, who were also responsible as a general contractor for the railway construction as a whole.

=== Rhaetian Railway between 1942 and 2003 ===
After the merger, the Rhaetian Railway renumbered the railcars of the BM to 451–455 and 471 respectively and modernized them. To rejuvenate the vehicle fleet, it put the railcar RhB BDe 4/4 no.491 into service in 1957. The two ABDe 4/4 nos. 483 and 484 of the Arosa Railway could occasionally be seen in the Mesocco on a temporary basis. In 1969 three railcars (451, 455, 471) were damaged in collisions. As a replacement, the Rhaetian Railway rented the 1933 vintage ABe 4/4 no. 41 from Appenzell Railways (AB), until 1972. After the 1978 storm, the Rhaetian Railway scrapped the ABDe 4/4 no. 452 and sold no. 453; 454 was brought on the road to the lower part of the route, where it served from then on as a reserve for the BDe 4/4 491, which carried the main load of the remaining traffic until 2003. 491 came to Landquart for an overhaul in 1980, during which time it was replaced by the ABe 4/4 no. 42 of the Appenzeller Bahn. In 1987 this railcar was rented long-term from the Rhaetian Railway and labeled Ferrovia Retica.

=== Ferrovia Mesolcinese/SEFT since 2003 ===
With the transition to preservation line, the Rhaetian Railway also transferred the MC’s entire rolling stock (railcars 42 and 491 and some passenger cars) to the Ferrovia Mesolcinese. In addition, the latter also acquired the second “Appenzeller”. Other Swiss narrow-gauge vehicles later found a new home here. Initially, the Ferrovia Mesolcinese had the following railcars, some of which are no more (where noted):

- Numbers 1–2, formerly AB ABe 4/4 41–42
- Number 3, formerly FLP ABe 4/4 3, demolished in 2007 after an accident, parts to Agno
- Number 4, formerly RhB ABDe 4/4 454, original BM railcar, in poor condition, inoperative, demolished on March 22, 2011
- Number 5, formerly BA ABe 4/4 5
- Number 6, formerly RhB BDe 4/4 491

=== Post 2012 Diaspora ===
On April 27, 2021, the RhB BDe 4/4 491 was transported with a low loader from Grono via San Bernardino to Landquart. Restoration in the RhB main workshop in Landquart was completed in May 2021. From mid-June 2021, the plan was to move the railcar to a new location in front of the Albula Railway Museumin Bergün/Bravuogn, to be exhibited as "Grotto 491".

The ABe 4/4 No. 5 went to the WAGI Museum in Schlieren

The B 51 passenger car is in Winterthur as a café-bar on the former premises of the former Swiss Locomotive and Machine Works. The B 52 was acquired by the Brohltal railway in Germany.
