= RE80 =

Regional train service in Switzerland and Italy

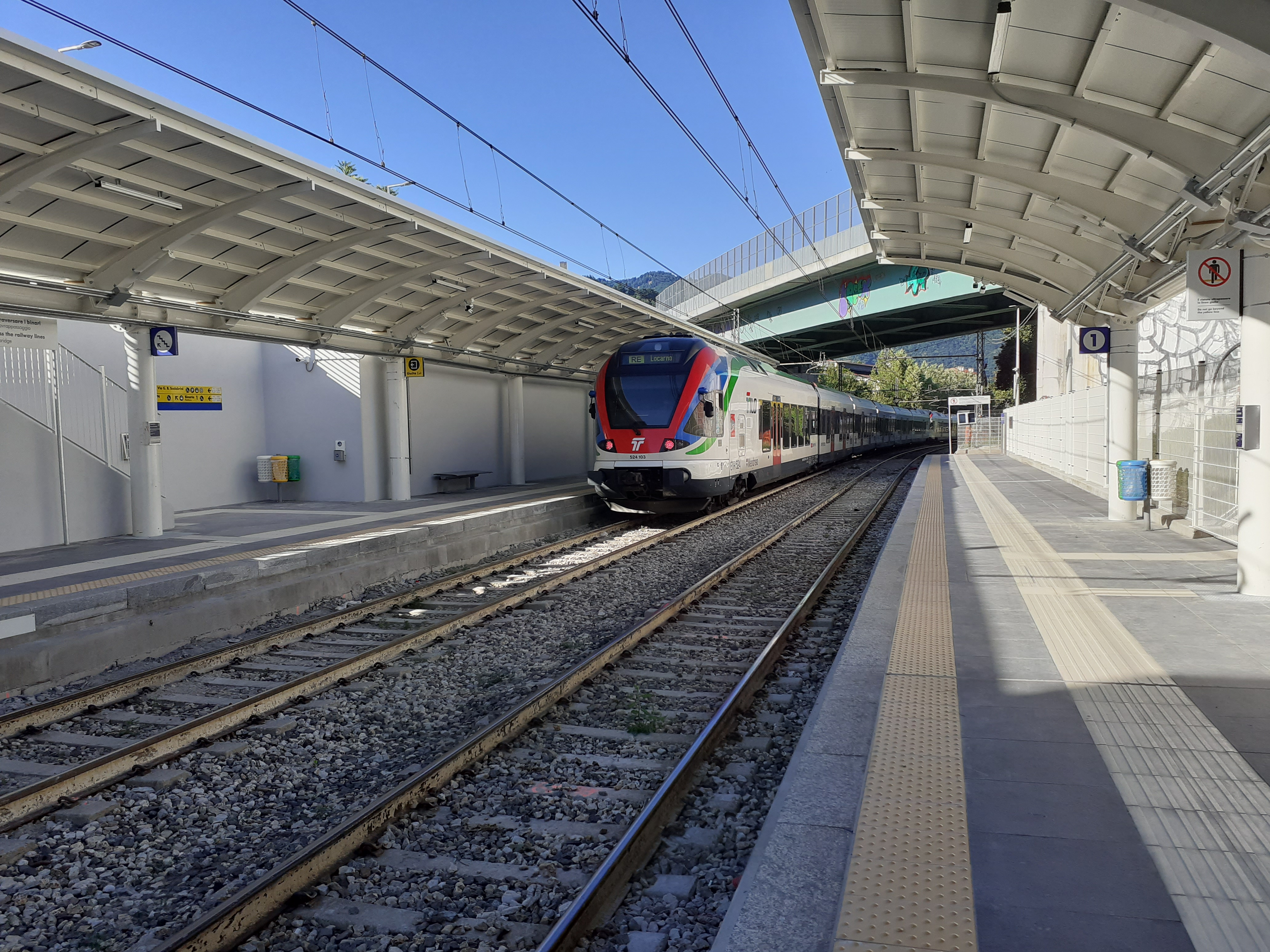
- RE80 at Como Camerlata in 2021

Overview
- First service: 13 December 2020
- Current operator: TiLo

Route
- Termini: Locarno; Milano Centrale
- Stops: 13
- Average journey time: 54 minutes (Locarno–Chiasso); 1 hour 52 minutes (Locarno–Milan)
- Service frequency: 30 minutes (Locarno–Chiasso); 60 minutes (Locarno–Milan)
- Lines used: Giubiasco–Locarno line; Gotthard line; Milan–Chiasso line

The RE80 is a RegioExpress service that runs every half-hour between Locarno and Chiasso in the Swiss canton of Ticino, with every other train continuing to Milano Centrale in Milan, Italy. The service is operated by Treni Regionali Ticino Lombardia (TILO), a joint venture between the Swiss Federal Railways and Trenord.

== Operations ==
The RE80 runs every half hour from Locarno to Chiasso, using the Giubiasco–Locarno line from Locarno to Sant'Antonino and the Gotthard line to Chiasso. The RE80 uses the Ceneri Base Tunnel between Sant'Antonino and Lugano, bypassing the traditional Gotthard route. South of Chiasso, every other train continues to Milano Centrale in Italy, providing hourly service between there and Locarno.

== History ==
The opening of the Ceneri Base Tunnel transformed regional services in Ticino. The RE80 began operation on 13 December 2020, running hourly from Locarno to Lugano with limited service beyond to Mendrisio or Chiasso. Its running mate was the RE10, running hourly between Castione-Arbedo, at the north end of the base tunnel, to Milano Centrale. This timetable was only temporary, and beginning on 5 April 2021 the RE80 began running half-hourly to Chiasso and hourly to Milano Centrale, replacing the RE10.
