= Locarno railway station =

Standard gauge railway station in Locarno, Ticino, Switzerland

Locarno
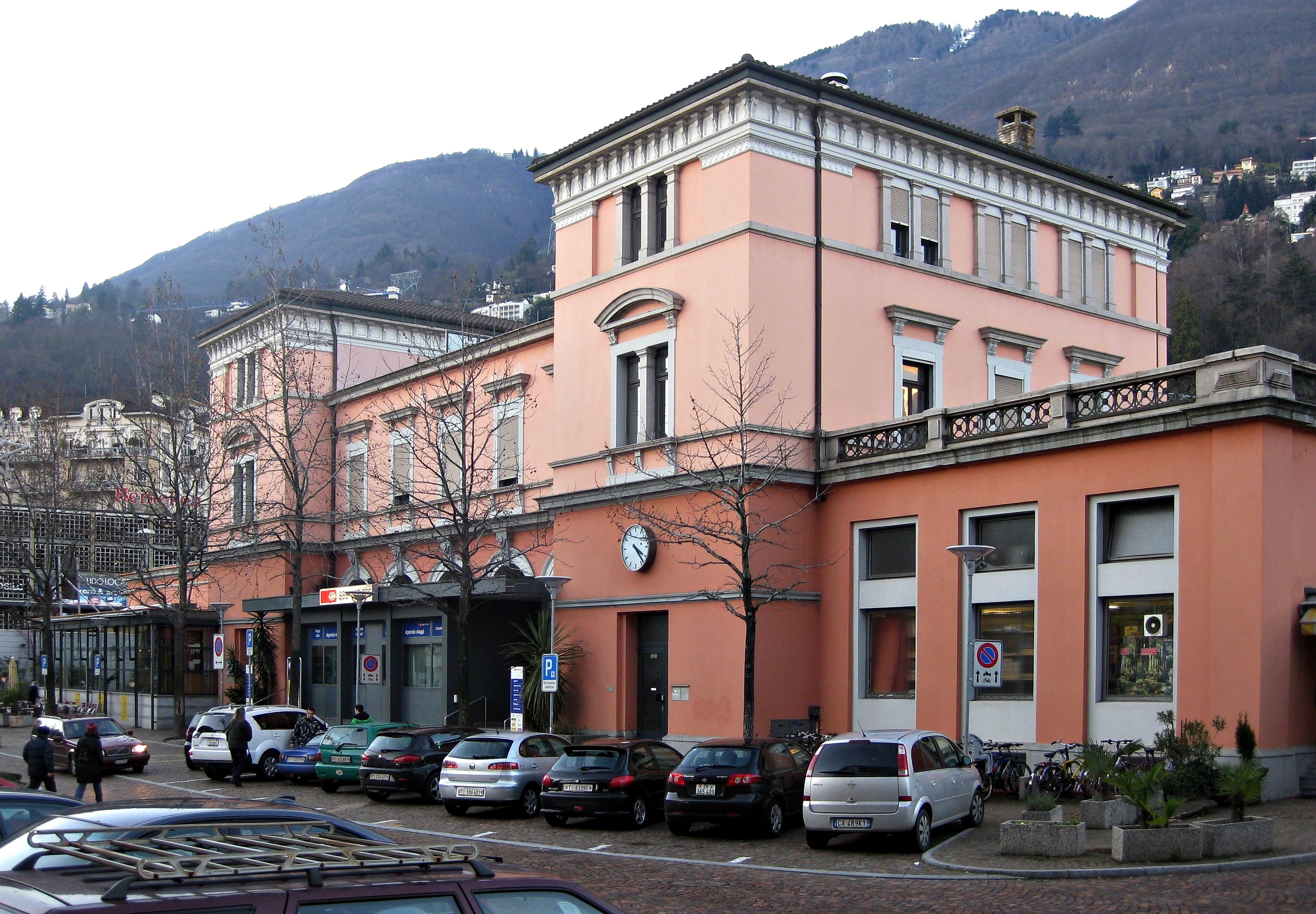
- The station building in 2011

General information
- Location: Muralto; Switzerland
- Coordinates: 46°10′21″N 8°48′05″E
- Elevation: 205 m (673 ft)
- Owner: Swiss Federal Railways
- Line: Giubiasco–Locarno line
- Distance: 180.5 km (112.2 mi) from Immensee
- Platforms: 3
- Tracks: 4
- Train operators: Südostbahn; Treni Regionali Ticino Lombardia
- Connections: Autopostale and FART buses

Other information
- Fare zone: 30/300 (Arcobaleno)

History
- Electrified: 15 May 1936

Passengers
- 2025: 10,800 per day (SBB, SOB)
- Rank: 71 out of 1,095

Services
Preceding station	Südostbahn	Following station
Terminus	IR 26	Tenero towards Basel SBB
Terminus	IR 46	Tenero towards Zürich Hauptbahnhof
Preceding station	TiLo	Following station
Terminus	RE80	Minusio towards Milano Centrale
Terminus	S20	Minusio towards Castione-Arbedo
Preceding station	FART	Following station
Locarno San Antonio towards Domodossola	Panorama Express transfer at Locarno FART	Terminus
Locarno San Antonio towards Camedo	Regio transfer at Locarno FART	Terminus
Location
- Location within Switzerland Location within Canton of Ticino

Locarno railway station (Italian: Stazione di Locarno) serves the city of Locarno, in the canton of Ticino, Switzerland. However, the station is located within the adjacent municipality of Muralto, near the shore of Lake Maggiore. The border between the two municipalities runs along the Torrente Ramogna stream, a short distance to the south and west of the station.

Since 1990, Locarno station has been divided into two distinct components, each served by a separately operated railway. At surface level, there is a standard gauge station, operated by the Swiss Federal Railways (SBB CFF FFS). That station is the terminal of a branch line from Giubiasco on the Gotthard Railway. Underground, there is another terminal station, Locarno FART, for the metre gauge Domodossola–Locarno railway, an international rail link operated in Switzerland by the Regional Bus and Rail Company of Canton Ticino (Italian: Ferrovie Autolinee Regionali Ticinesi, or FART).

Before the station was renovated into this form, the metre gauge trains operated from a separate platform on the station forecourt. As part of the reconstruction, the standard gauge station was augmented by a new finger platform between tracks two and three. Additionally, the two railway lines' goods yards were removed, and the underground station constructed in their place.

== Services ==
As of the December 2021 timetable change, the following services stop at Locarno:

- InterRegio: hourly service to Arth-Goldau; trains continue to Basel SBB or Zürich Hauptbahnhof.
- RE80: half-hourly service to Chiasso and hourly service to Milano Centrale.
- S20: half-hourly service to Castione-Arbedo.

== Gallery ==
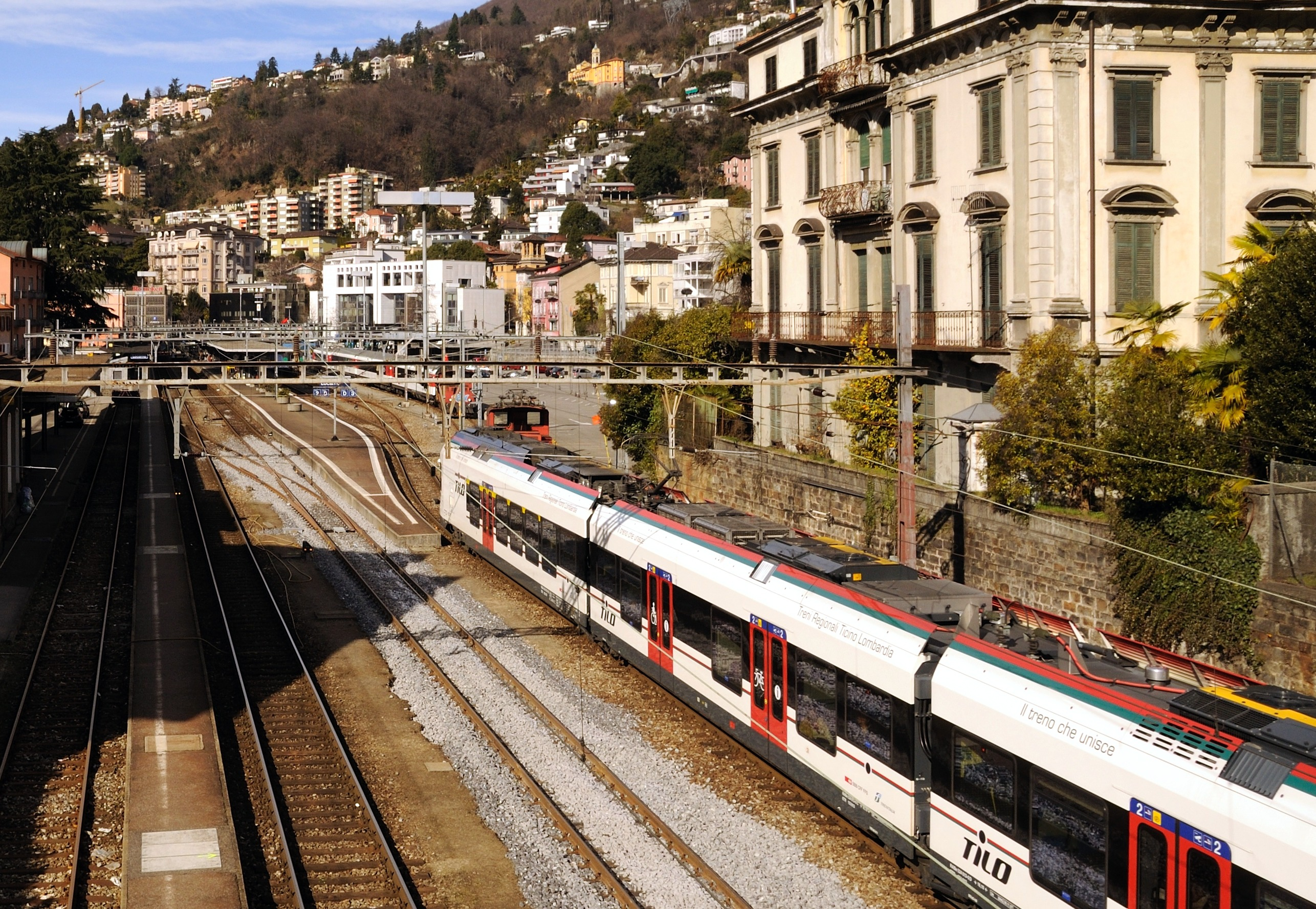
A TILO train arriving at the station in 2009

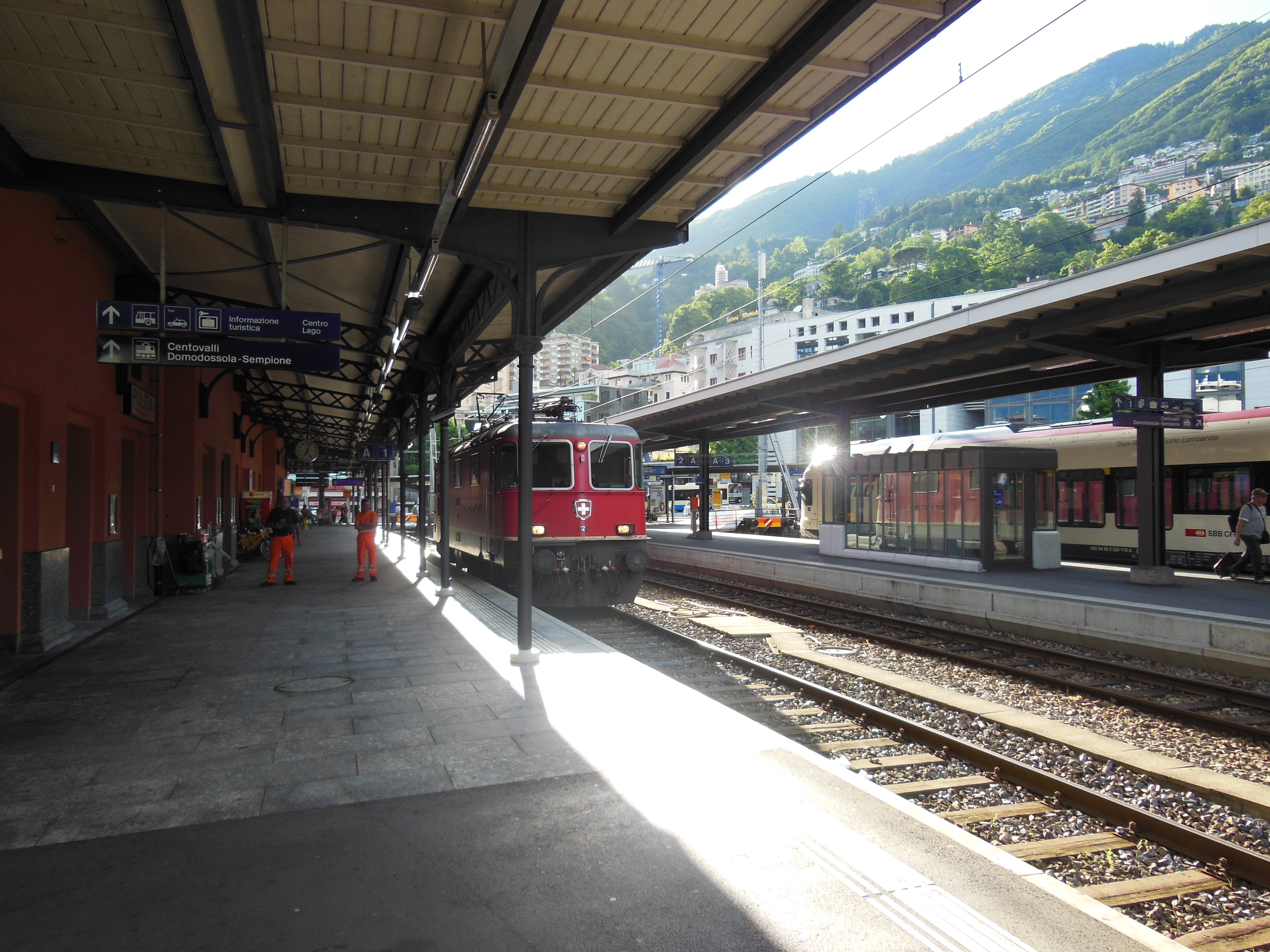
The above ground platforms

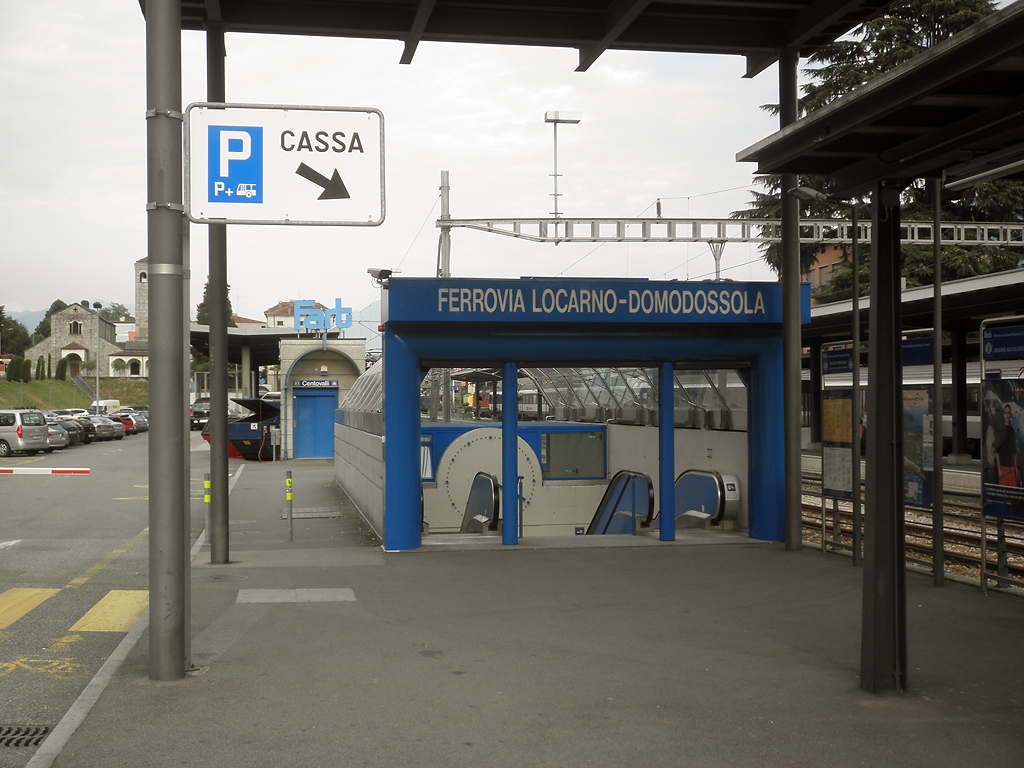
The entrance to the underground platforms

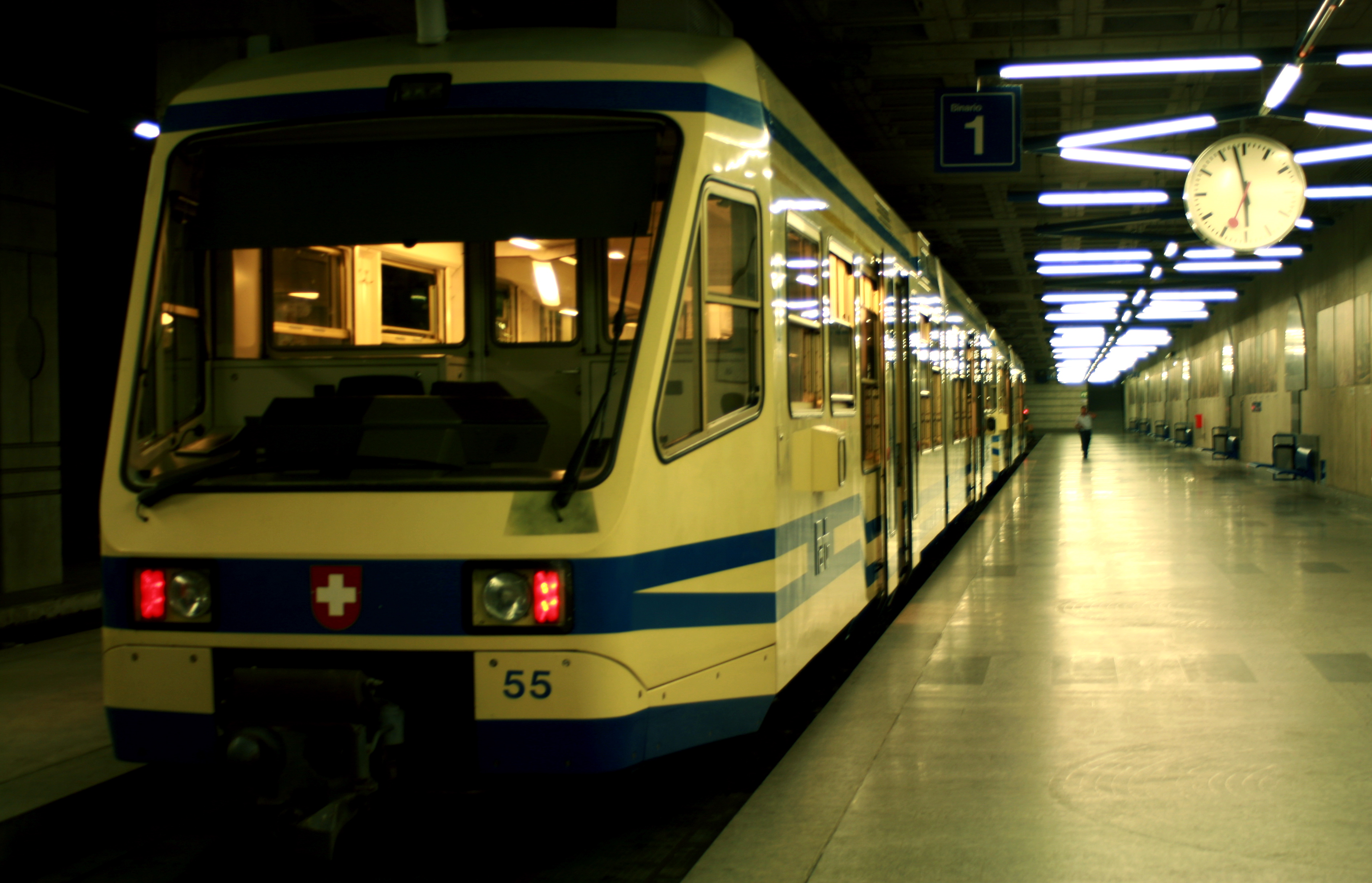
A FART train in the underground platforms

== See also ==
- Rail transport in Switzerland
