= S20 (TILO) =

Railway in Switzerland

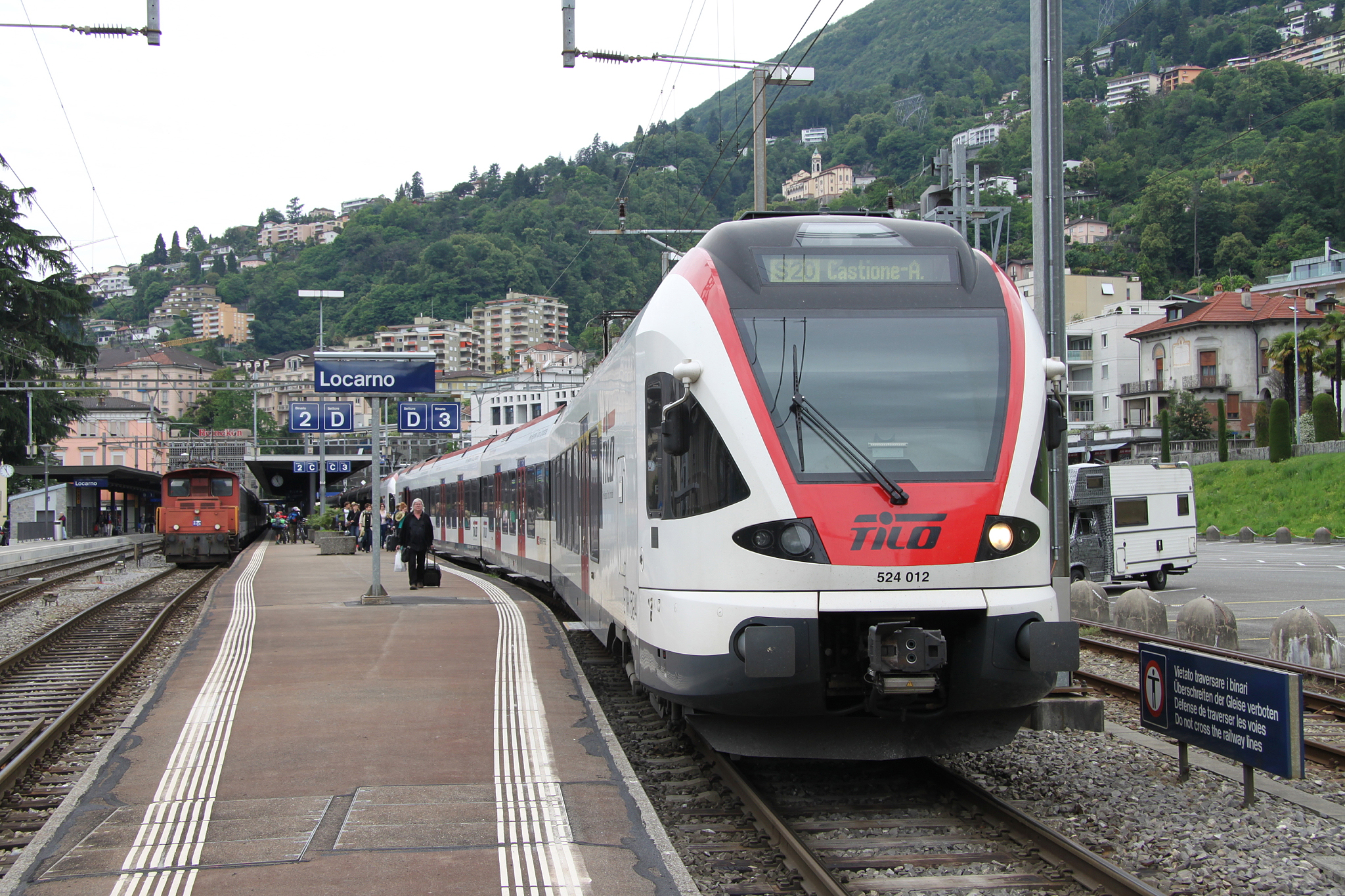
- A Castione-Arbedo-bound S20 at Locarno in 2015

Overview
- First service: 2004
- Current operator(s): Treni Regionali Ticino Lombardia

Route
- Termini: Castione-Arbedo; Locarno
- Distance travelled: 24.6 kilometres (15.3 mi)
- Average journey time: 33 minutes
- Service frequency: 30 minutes
- Line(s) used: Gotthard line; Giubiasco–Locarno line

The S20 is a railway service that runs every half-hour between Castione-Arbedo and Locarno in the Swiss canton of Ticino. Treni Regionali Ticino Lombardia (TILO), a joint venture of Swiss Federal Railways and Trenord, operates the service.

== Operations ==
The S20 runs every 30 minutes between Castione-Arbedo and Locarno, using the Gotthard line from Castione-Arbedo to Giubiasco and then the Giubiasco–Locarno line to Locarno.
