= Castione-Arbedo railway station =

Railway station in Switzerland

Castione-Arbedo
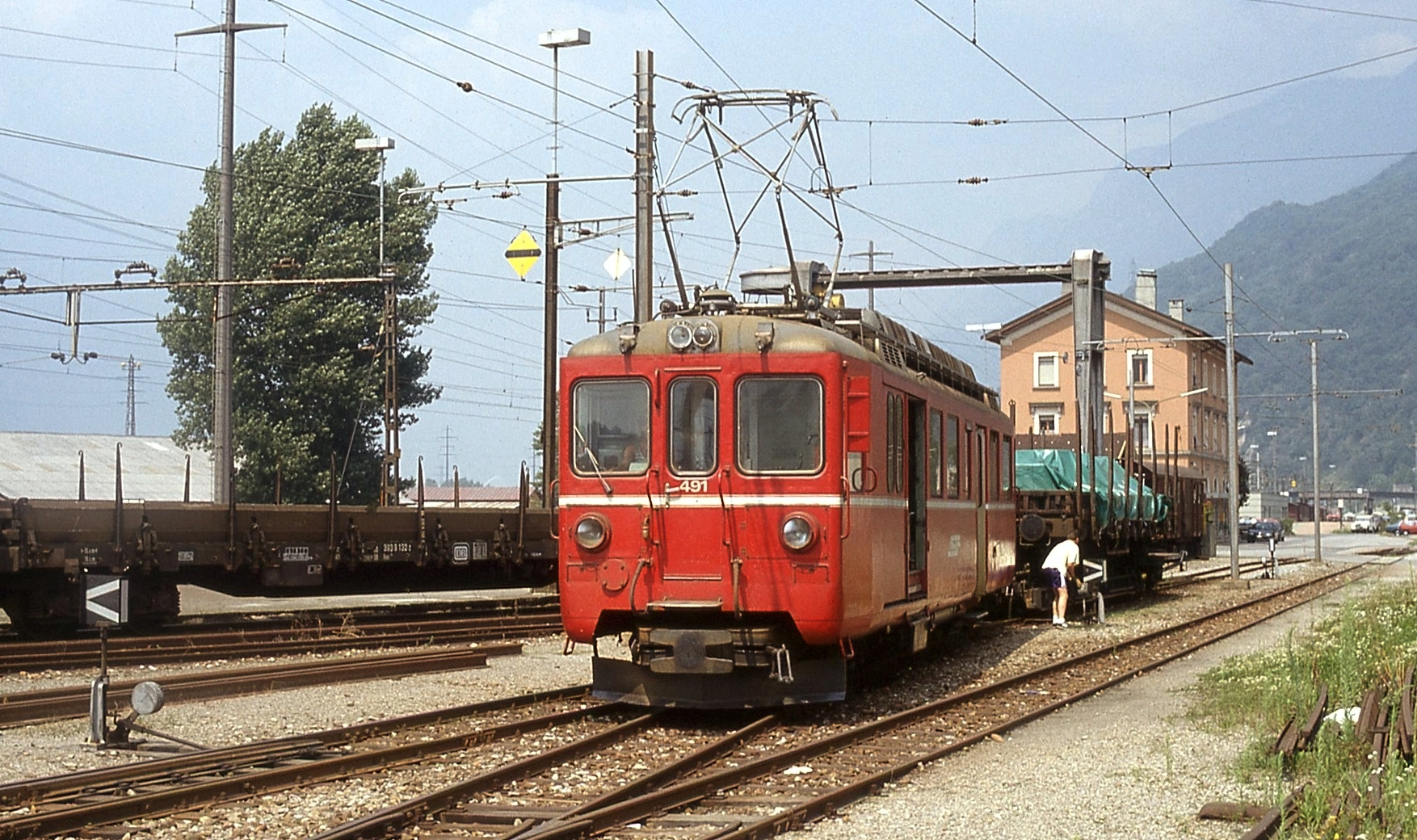
- Castione-Arbedo station in 1977, with BM track and train in the foreground

General information
- Location: Via Stazione; Arbedo-Castione; Switzerland
- Coordinates: 46°13′22″N 9°02′29″E
- Elevation: 240 m (790 ft)
- Owner: Swiss Federal Railways
- Lines: Gotthard line; Bellinzona–Mesocco line (closed)
- Distance: 147.3 km (91.5 mi) from Immensee
- Train operators: Südostbahn; Treni Regionali Ticino Lombardia
- Connections: Autopostale bus services

Other information
- Fare zone: 200 and 210 (arcobaleno)

Passengers
- 2018: 1,000 per weekday

Services
Preceding station	Südostbahn	Following station
Biasca towards Basel SBB	IR 26	Bellinzona towards Locarno
Biasca towards Zürich HB	IR 46	Bellinzona towards Locarno
Preceding station	TiLo	Following station
Biasca towards Airolo	S10	Bellinzona towards Como San Giovanni
Biasca towards Airolo	S50	Bellinzona towards Malpensa Aeroporto Terminal 2
Terminus	S20	Bellinzona towards Locarno
Location

Castione-Arbedo railway station is a railway station in the Swiss canton of Ticino and municipality of Arbedo-Castione. The station is on the Swiss Federal Railways Gotthard railway, between Biasca and Bellinzona.

From 1907, Castione-Arbedo station was the principal interchange point between the Gotthard railway and the Bellinzona–Mesocco railway (BM), a metre gauge railway linking Bellinzona and various communities in the Val Mesolcina as far as Mesocco. The line closed to passenger traffic in 1972, and to freight traffic in 2003, but the section north as far as Cama, operated as the Ferrovia Mesolcinese tourist line until its final closure in 2013.

== Services ==
As of the December 2021 timetable change, the following services stop at Castione-Arbedo:

- InterRegio: hourly service between Locarno and Arth-Goldau; trains continue to Basel SBB or Zürich Hauptbahnhof.
- S10 / S50: half-hourly service to Mendrisio and hourly service to Chiasso, Como San Giovanni, or Malpensa Aeroporto Terminal 2. One train per day continues to Airolo.
- S20: half-hourly service to Locarno.

The station is also served by bus services operated by Autopostale, including an hourly service between Bellinzona and Airolo that parallels the railway line.
