= Comunità tariffale Ticino e Moesano =

Transit district in Ticino and part of Grisons, Switzerland

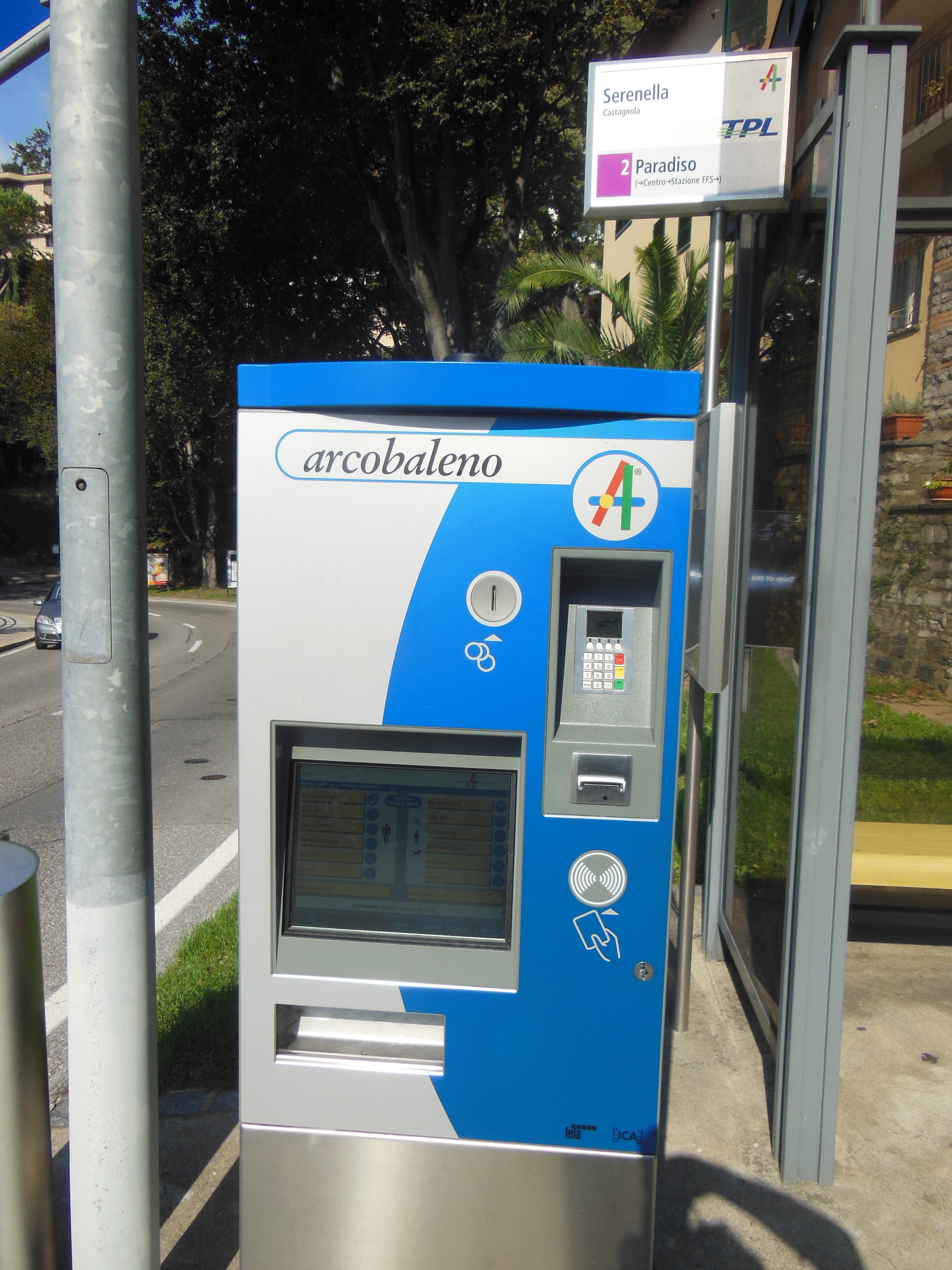
An Arcobaleno ticket machine at a TPL bus stop

The Comunità tariffale Ticino e Moesano, also known by its marketing name arcobaleno, is a Swiss tariff network covering the whole of the canton of Ticino, together with the Moesano district of the canton of Graubünden.

Arcobaleno offers various kinds of tickets, from single tickets to annual season tickets, which are valid on the buses, trains and boats of the operators that are members of the network. Tickets are only valid within the arcobaleno area, and a few operators have further restrictions on which tickets are accepted on which services. Ticket prices are based on zones, with 49 zones covering the whole of the arcobaleno area, whilst season tickets use a coarser zone structure of only 16 zones.

Tickets are available from the offices of the operators. Ticket machines sell a range of tickets at railway stations and urban bus stops. Where ticket machines are not available at bus stops, tickets may be obtained from the bus driver.

== Operators ==
The operators which make up the network are:

- Autolinee Bleniesi (ABL)
- Autolinea Mendrisiense (AMSA)
- Autolinee Regionali Luganesi (ARL)
- Ferrovie Autolinee Regionali Ticinesi (FART)
- Ferrovie Luganesi (FLP)
- Funicolare Locarno - Madonna del Sasso (FLMS) †
- Navigazione Lago Maggiore (NLM) †
- PostBus Switzerland
- Società Navigazione del Lago di Lugano (SNL) †
- Swiss Federal Railways (FFS)
- Treni Regionali Ticino Lombardia (TILO)
- Trasporti Pubblici Luganesi (TPL)

† - limitations to ticket acceptance
