= Brè-Aldesago =

Coordinates: 46°00′31.68″N 8°58′45.48″E

- Quarter
- Flag Coat of arms

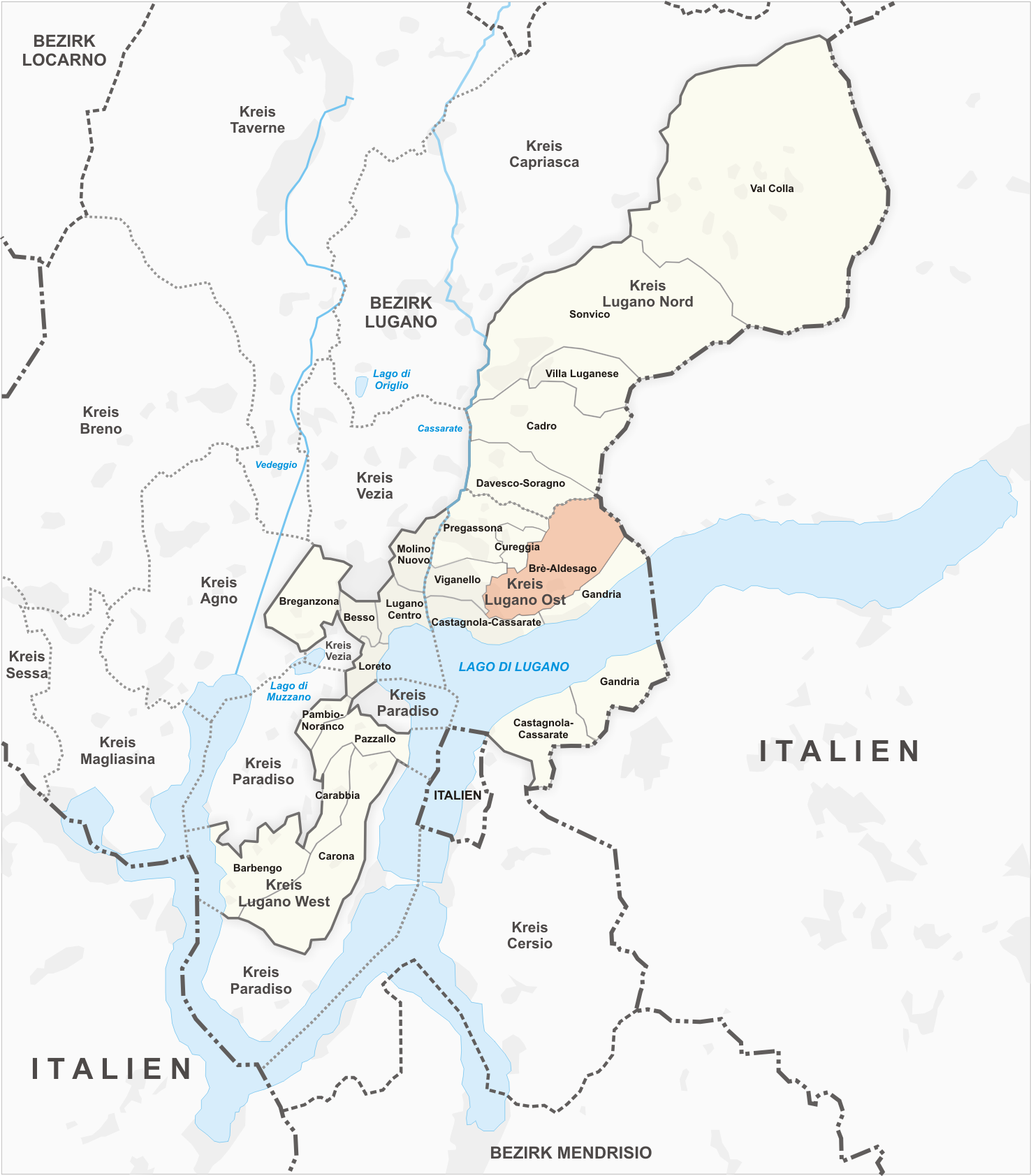
- Country: Switzerland
- Canton: Ticino
- District: Lugano
- City: Lugano

Area
  - Total: 4.2 km^{2} (1.6 sq mi)

Population (2012-12-31)
  - Total: 1,076
  - Density: 260/km^{2} (660/sq mi)

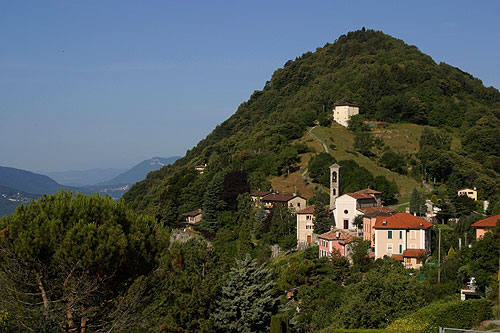
The village of Brè from the east, with Monte Brè behind. Aldesago (and Lugano) are on the other side of Monte Brè.

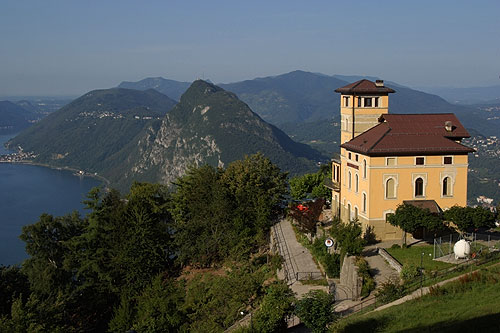
Restaurant near summit of Monte Brè, with view of Lake Lugano

Brè-Aldesago is a quarter of the city of Lugano, in the Swiss canton of Ticino.

Aerial view by Walter Mittelholzer (1919)

It occupies the slopes and summit of Monte Brè, and contains the mountain villages of Brè, to the east of the summit, and Aldesago, to the west. It has an area of 420 hectares (1,000 acres) and, in 2011, it had a population of 1,055.

Historically, Brè-Aldesago was an independent municipality, known simply as Brè until 1953. The municipality had 178 inhabitants in 1591, which increased to 244 in 1801, 378 in 1850, 393 in 1900, 400 in 1950 and 411 in 1970. It was incorporated into Lugano in 1972.

Brè was first recorded in 1280 as de Bre, and for most of its history has lived by agriculture and livestock. Until 1912, the only access to the village was on foot or by mule, but in that year Brè was reached by a road from Lugano via Aldesago, and the Monte Brè funicular was opened between Lugano and the summit of Monte Brè. Subsequently, Brè-Aldesago has become a resort and residential suburb.

The Brè-Aldesago quarter is accessed by a steep and winding road from Lugano. This first climbs to Aldesago village, before crossing the southern slopes of Monte Brè to reach Brè village. A further road ascends from near Brè village to near the summit of Monte Brè. Trasporti Pubblici Luganesi (TPL) bus route 12 operates from Lugano city centre to Brè village via Aldesago village, with one or two buses per hour. The Monte Brè funicular connects the Lugano suburb of Cassarate, itself served by frequent city buses, to the summit of Monte Brè, running every half-hour.

The summit of Monte Brè is a significant tourist attraction, with expansive views over Lake Lugano and the Alps, and several restaurants. Brè village is the home of the Wilhelm Schmid Museum, which contains a collection of works by Wilhelm Schmid (1892–1971), together with an artistic trail that includes the works of 20 nationally and internationally acclaimed artists.
