= Castagnola =

Castagnola may refer to:

- Castagnola-Cassarate, quarter of the city of Lugano, in the Swiss canton of Ticino
- Castagnola, Switzerland, village on the northern shore of Lake Lugano, Switzerland
- Castagnola (surname), Italian surname
- Castagnola's, historical restaurant in San Francisco, California, United States of America

== See also ==
- Castagnole (disambiguation)
