= Giuseppe Isola =

Italian painter (1808–1893)

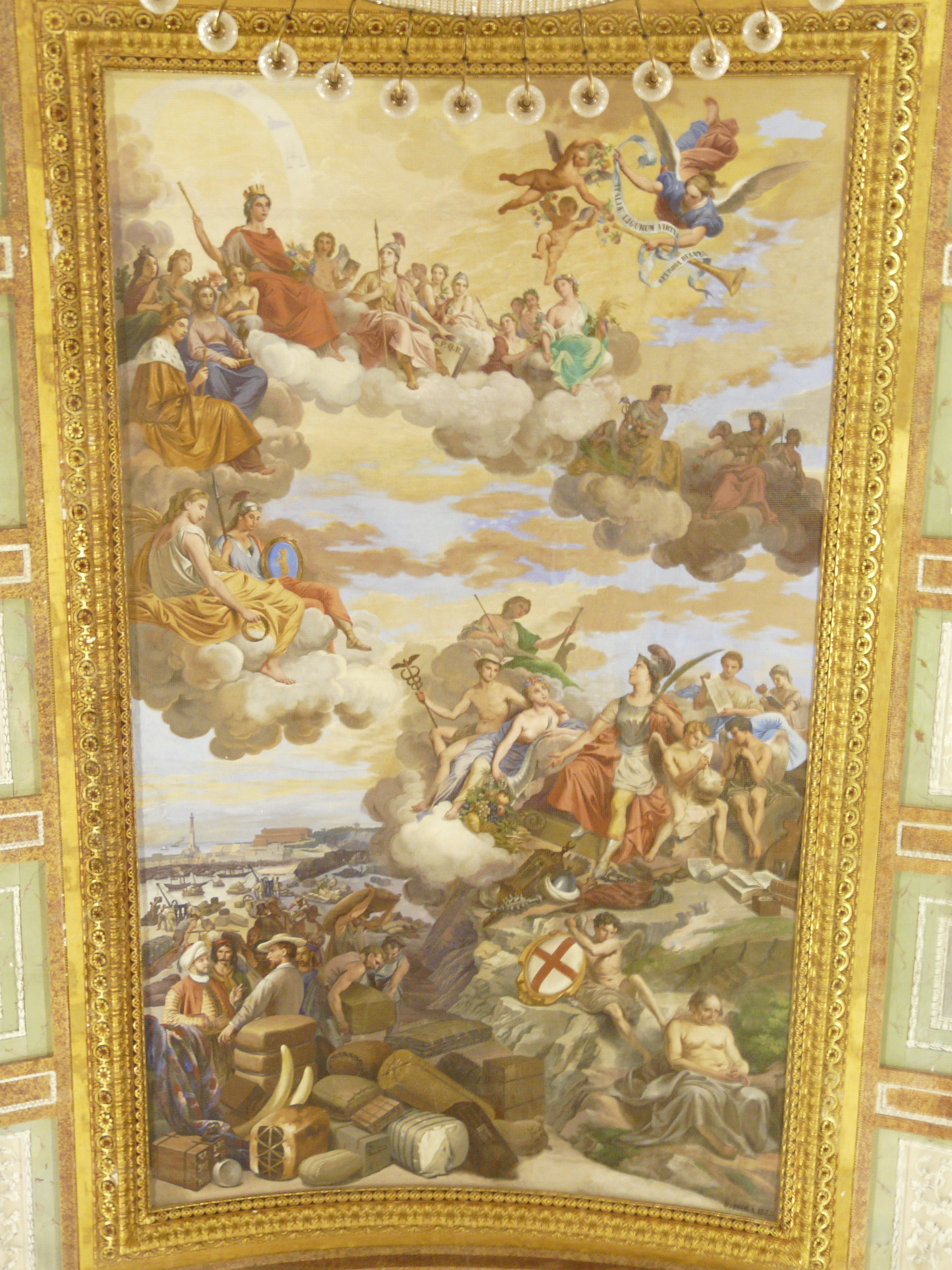
L'allegoria del Commercio dei Liguri in the Maggior Consiglio hall in Doge's Palace, Genoa.

Giuseppe (Tommaso Giuseppe) Isola (Genoa, April 7, 1808 – Genoa, July 21, 1893) was an Italian painter.

== Biography ==
He was the son of Gaetano Isola and Maria Annunziata Rolleri, during his youth he displayed his works in his father's furniture shop. His talent was noticed by marquess Giancarlo Serra, who became his patreon and allowed him to study painting in the Accademia Ligustica di Belle Arti and afterwards to travel Tuscany, Latium and Lombardy to improve his skills. In Liguria, Giuseppe focused on learning the fresco styles commonly used by artists in the sixteenth and seventeenth centuries.

His artistic debut took place in 1834, when he presented his portrait titled La Congiura di Gian Luigi Fieschi in the Accademia Ligustica. Giuseppe also presented Il conte di Carmagnola condannato a morte dal Senato di Venezia si congeda dalla famiglia and l'Assassinio di Alessandro de' Medici in1836.

Maria Drago wrote a letter in 1838 to her son Giuseppe Mazzini, an Italian national activist, noting how Isola was arrested and questioned in regards to his painting La morte di Opizzino d'Alzate, 1837, as the faces of the conjurants depicted in the work were similar to several patriots from Genoa.

Starting from 1841 Isola created some works commissioned by the Savoia family, such as the paintings Alcuni drappelli de' dragoni del re sbaragliano i Francesi sotto Mondovì and La strage degli innocenti which he made in Turin, where he was nominated as honorary historical painter at the court of Charles Albert of Sardinia, as well as several frescos in the halls of Palazzo Reale in Genoa.

In the following years Isola worked under commission producing works such as the fresco of the allegory of Commercio dei Liguri for the rooftop of the hall of Maggior Consiglio in Palazzo Ducale, Genoa and il Trionfo della Scienza in Liguria on the roof of the main hall of the Università di Genova, which was destroyed in World War II.

As an acknowledgment of his works Isola became an honorary professor in the Accademia Ligustica di Belle Arti in 1845, where he taught painting courses (from 1848 to 1851), nudes (from 1851 to 1871) and realism (from 1872). He was an associate of the Accademia di San Luca in Rome as well as for the academies of Bologna and Perugia, and the director of the galerries of Palazzo Bianco and Palazzo Rosso. Isola was friends with sculptors Giovanni Duprè and Santo Varni, as well as Massimo d'Azeglio, Giuseppe Frascheri and composer Giuseppe Verdi. Giuseppe also taught art to Gabriele Castagnola, Santo Bertelli and Nicolò Barabino

== Gallery ==
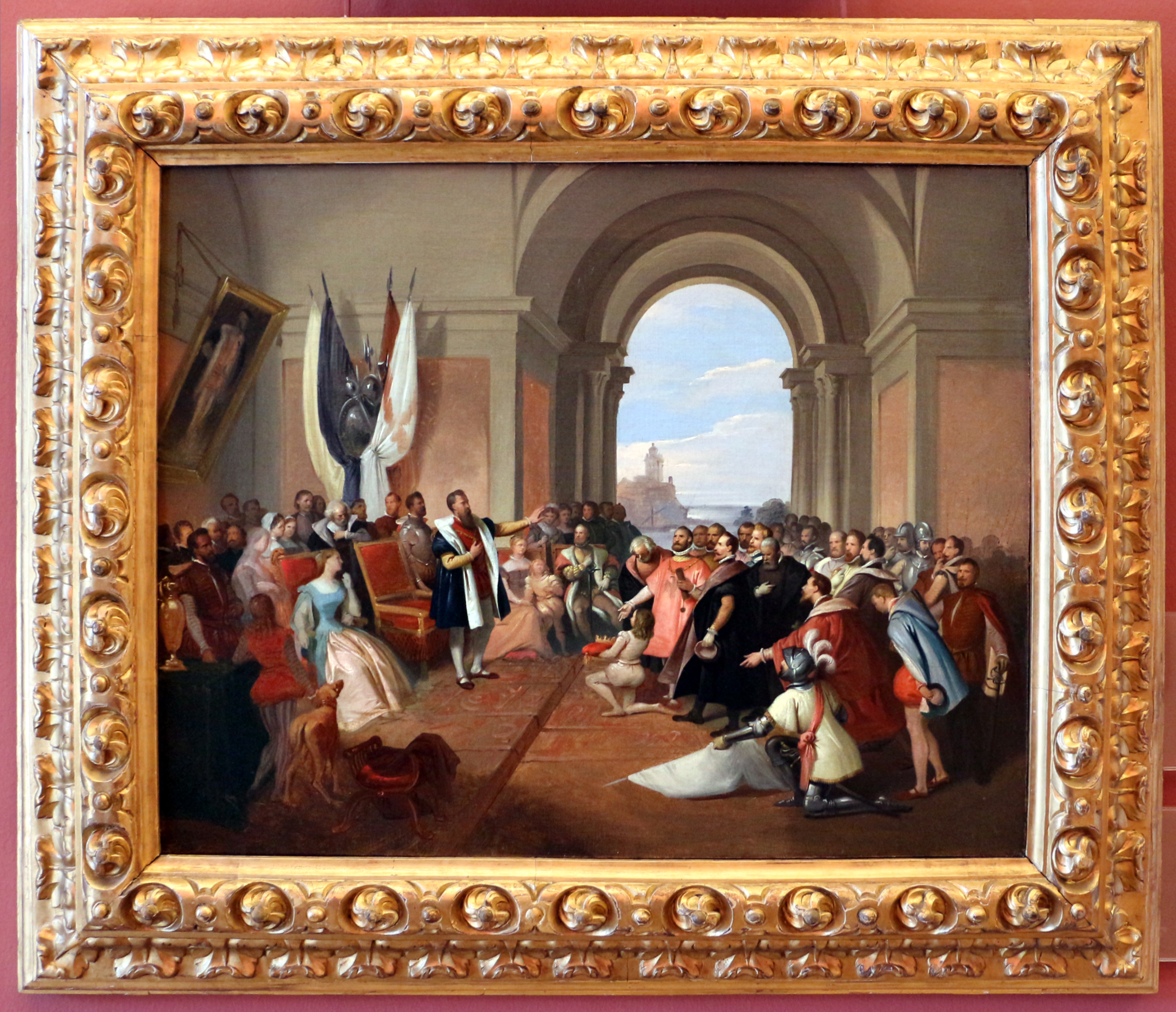
Andrea Doria che rifiuta la corona di Genova

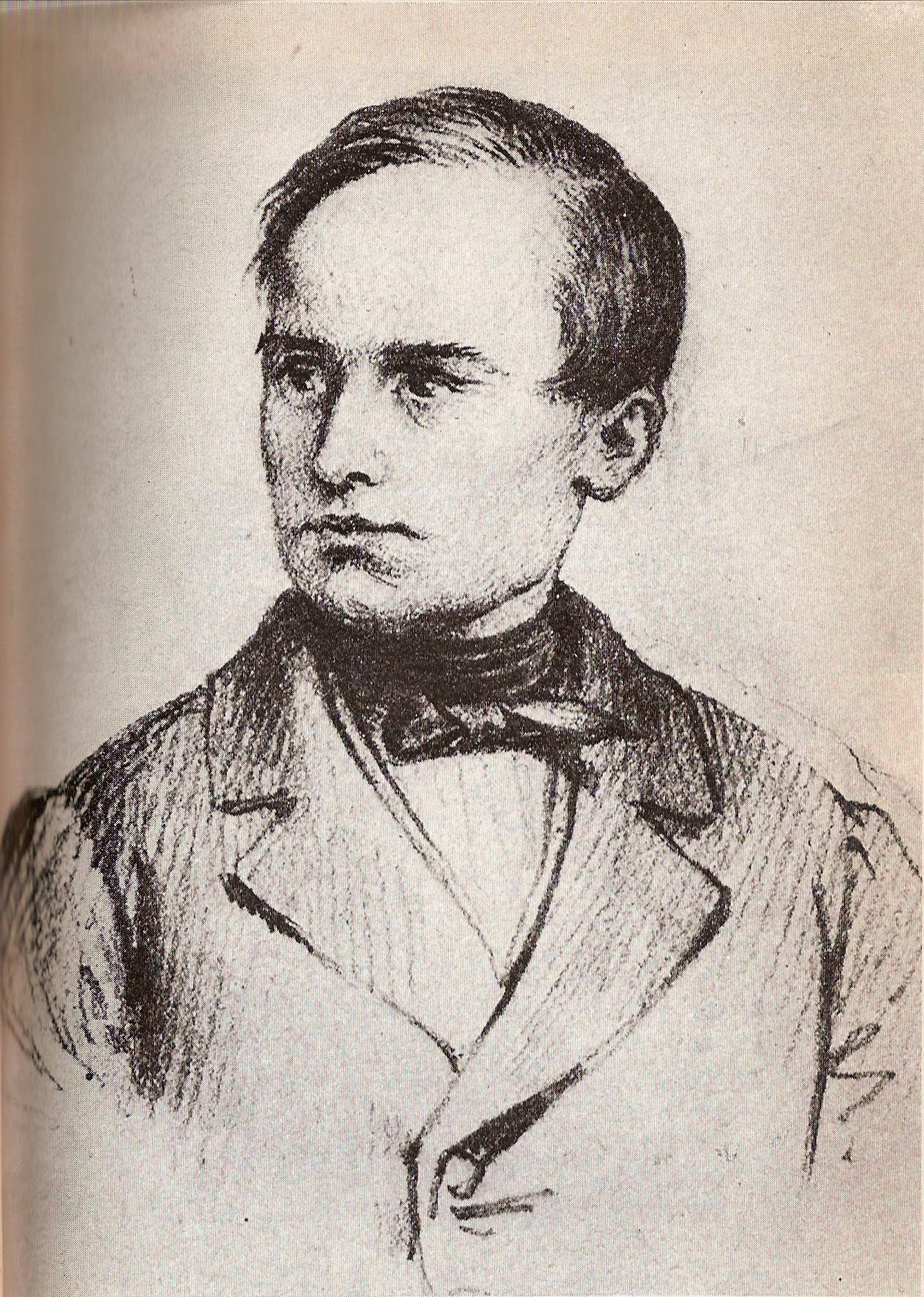
Sketch of Giuseppe Mazzini in 1830

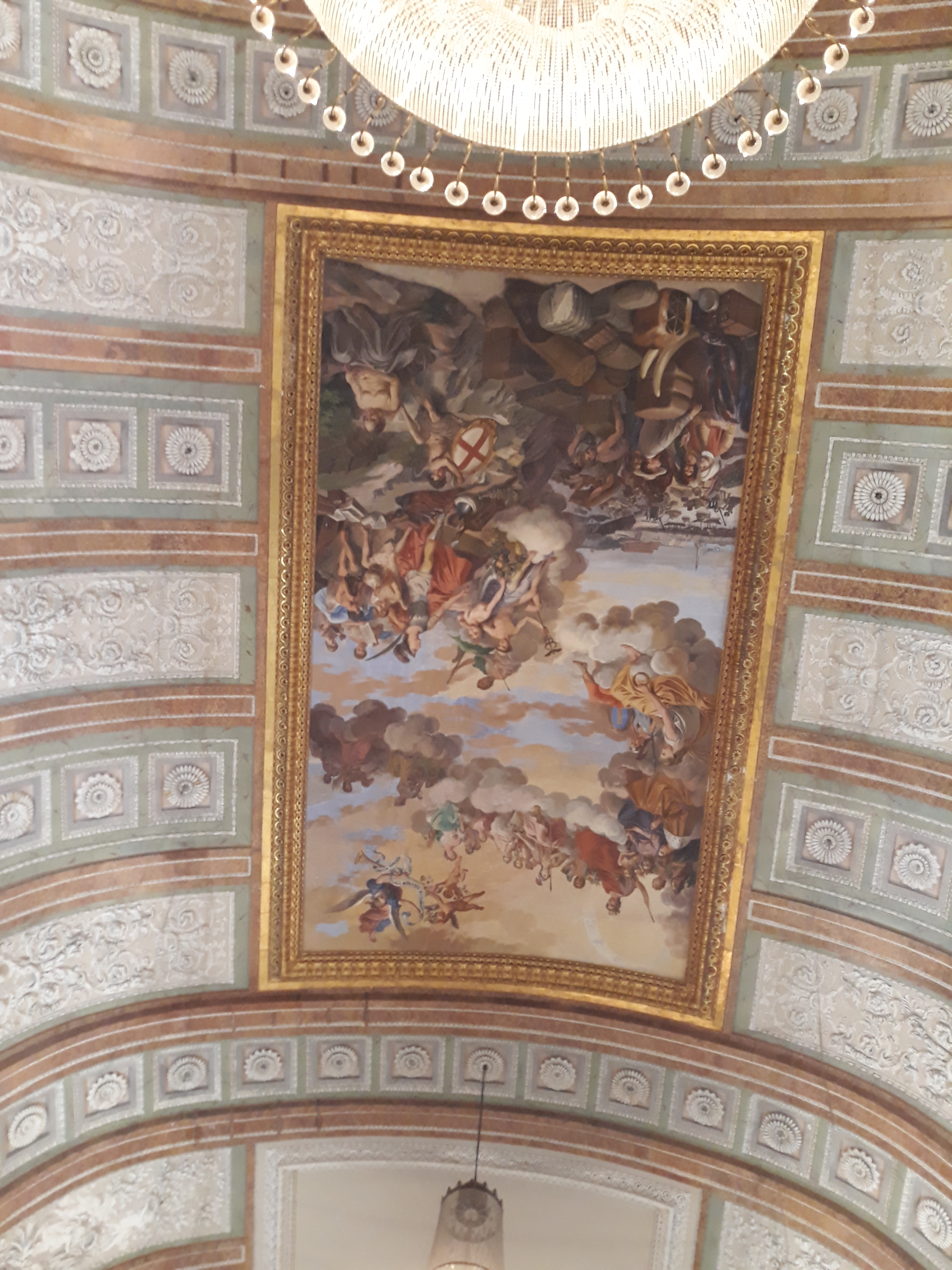
Palazzo Ducale's main hall's roof

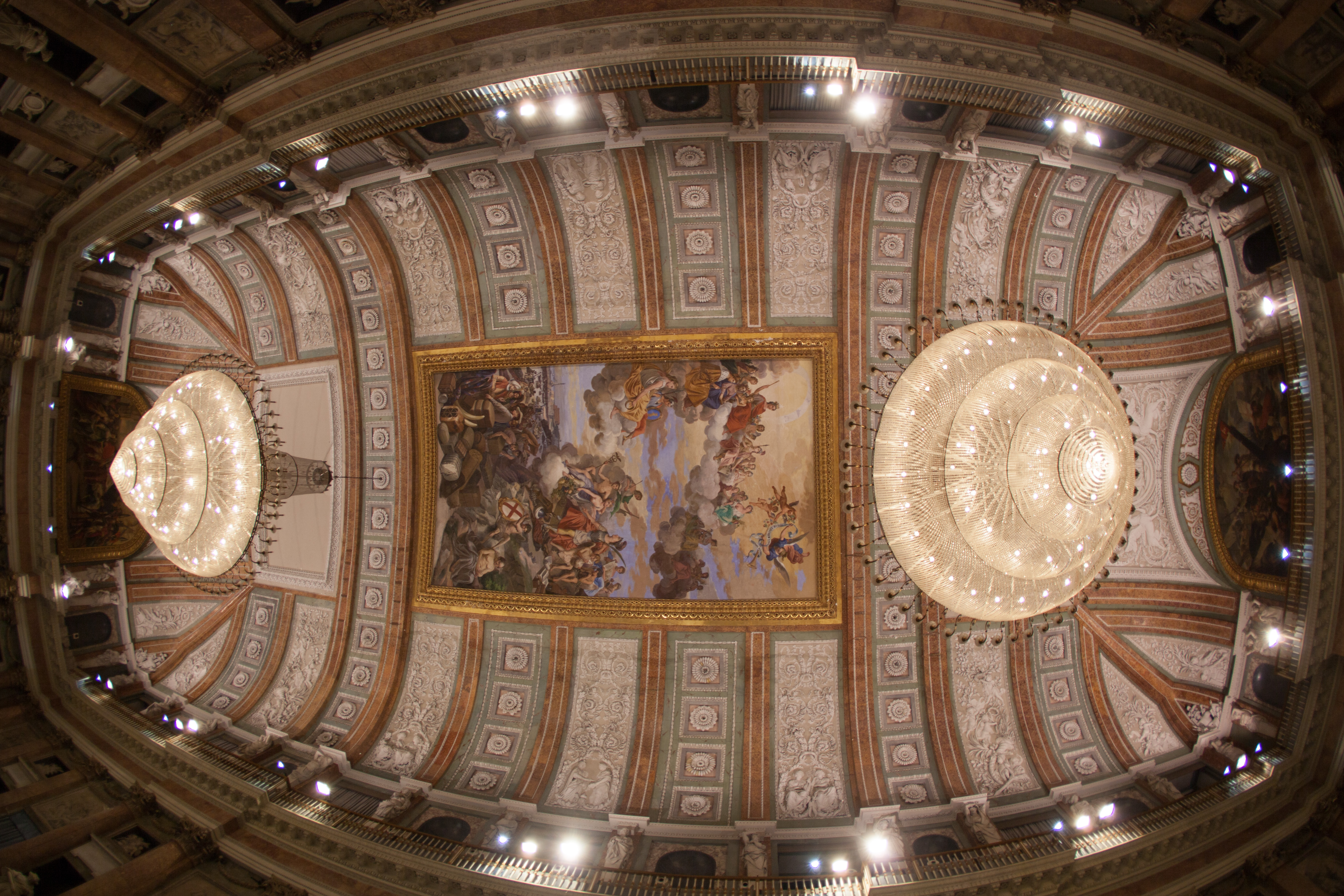
Palazzo Ducale's main hall's roof

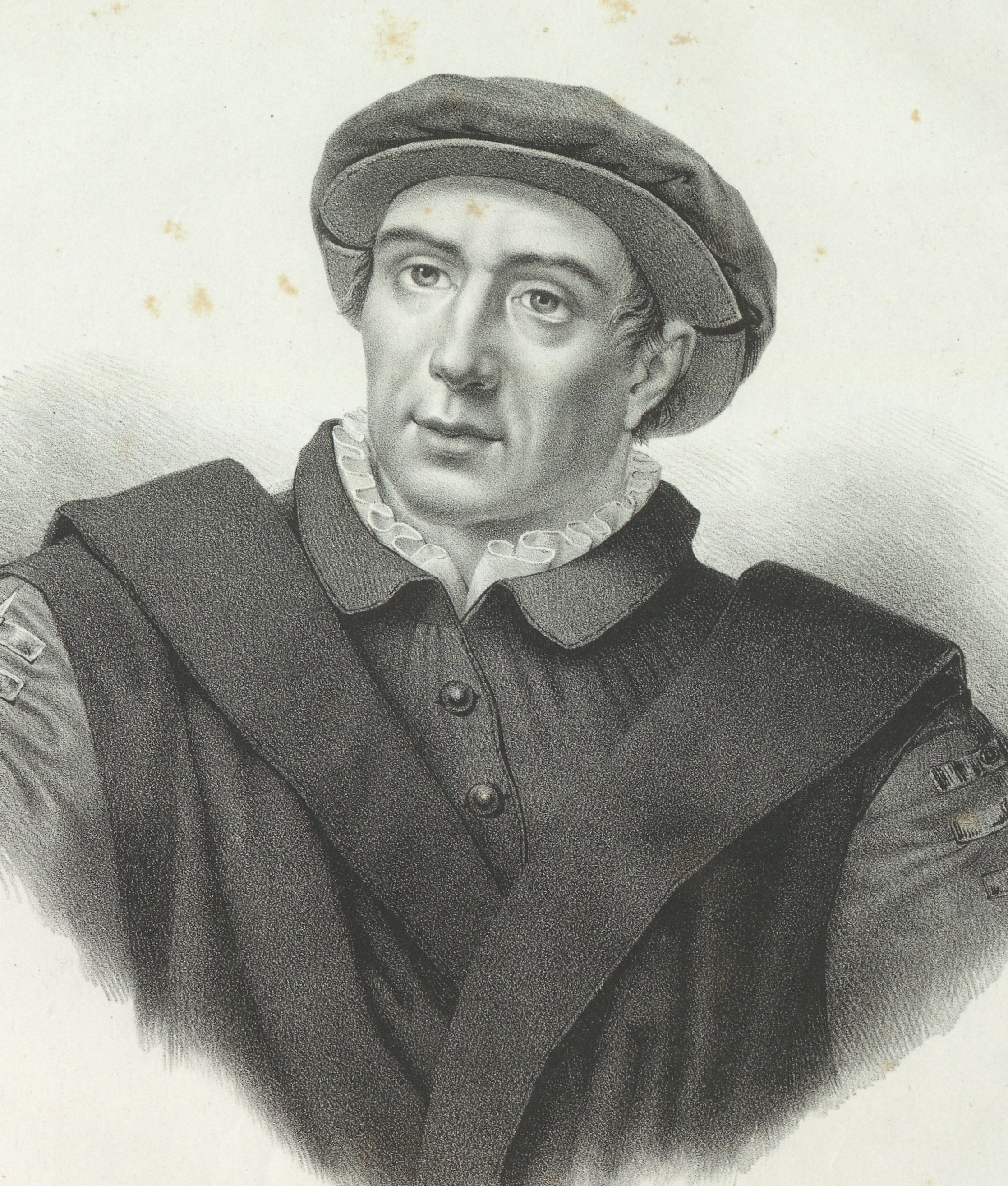
Portrait of Simone Boccanegra, before 1893

== List of Works ==
Giuseppe Isola's most notable wortks are as follows:

- La congiura di Gian Luigi Fieschi, 1834
- Il conte di Carmagnola condannato a morte dal Senato di Venezia si congeda dalla famiglia, 1836
- L'assassinio di Alessandro de' Medici, 1836
- La morte di Opizzino d'Alzate, 1837
- Il conte Ugolino, 1850
- Alcuni drappelli de' dragoni del re sbaragliano i Francesi sotto Mondovì, 1844, Turin, basilica di Superga
- La strage degli innocenti, 1851, Turin, Royal Palace of Turin
- Lo studio del pittore, Genova, Palazzo Doria Spinola
- Trionfo del Petrarca
- Tasso alla tomba di Eleonora, Genoa, Palazzo Podestà
- Tasso alla corte di Ferrara
- Giotto bambino e Cimabue
- Andrea Doria rifiuta la corona (a now destroyed decoration used on the curtaincall of the genoa teather Andrea Doria, the initial design is still conserved in the Galleria d'arte moderna in Genova-Nervi)
- Colombo in catene, 1863, Genoa, Palazzo Rosso
- Ritratto di Niccolò Paganini, 1835, Galleria d'Arte Moderna di Genova Nervi
- Ritratto del Dottor Guasconi, 1835, Galleria d'Arte Moderna di Genova Nervi
- Ritratto di Monsignor Ridolfo Brignole Sale, 1835, Galleria d'Arte Moderna di Genova Nervi
- Ritratto di Papa Pio IX, 1847, donated to the Accademia ligustica di belle arti
- Ritratto di Raffaele de Ferrari o del duca di Gallico, Genoa, Palazzo Rosso
- Ritratto di Santo Varni, 1836
- Ritratto di fanciulla, 1893
- Autoritratto, 1870, Florence, Uffizi, a copy of a self-portrait donated in 1863 to the Accademia Ligustica di Belle Arti
- Frescos in the genoa churches of Nunziata (1840), San Giorgio (1857),Consolazione (1874) San Francesco da Paola and Sant'Ambrogio in Varazze
- Giano consegna a Giove le chiavi del tempio della Guerra, 1843, fresco in the hall of Palazzo Reale in Genoa
- Giove manda sulla terra la Giustizia e la Prosperità, fresco in the dance hall of Palazzo Reale, Genoa
- Il riposo di Giove, fresco in the study of Palazzo Reale, Genoa
- Nettuno con tritoni, 1864, fresco in the loggia of Palazzo Reale, Genova
- Il commercio dei Liguri, 1866, fresco on the roof of the Maggior Consiglio hall in Doge's Palace, Genoa
- Trionfo della Scienza in Liguria, 1871, fresco in the main hall of the Università di Genova, destroyed during World War II
