= Castagnola (surname) =

Castagnola is an Italian surname. Notable people with the name include:

- Bartolomé Castagnola (1970), Argentine polo player
- Gabriele Castagnola, (1828 – 1883), Italian artist
- Giuliano Castagnola, (1572 – 1620), Italian Catholic
- Lou Castagnola (1936), American long-distance runner
- Luigi Castagnola (water polo) (1953), Italian former water polo player
- Luigi Castagnola (politician) (1936), Italian politician
- Rosa Graciela Castagnola (1931), Argentine politician better known as Graciela Fernández Meijide

== See also ==
- Castagnola (disambiguation)
