= Aldesago =

Coordinates: 46°00′30″N 8°58′45″E

- Village
- Interactive map of Aldesago
- Country: Switzerland
- Canton: Ticino
- District: Lugano
- City: Lugano
- Quarter: Brè-Aldesago

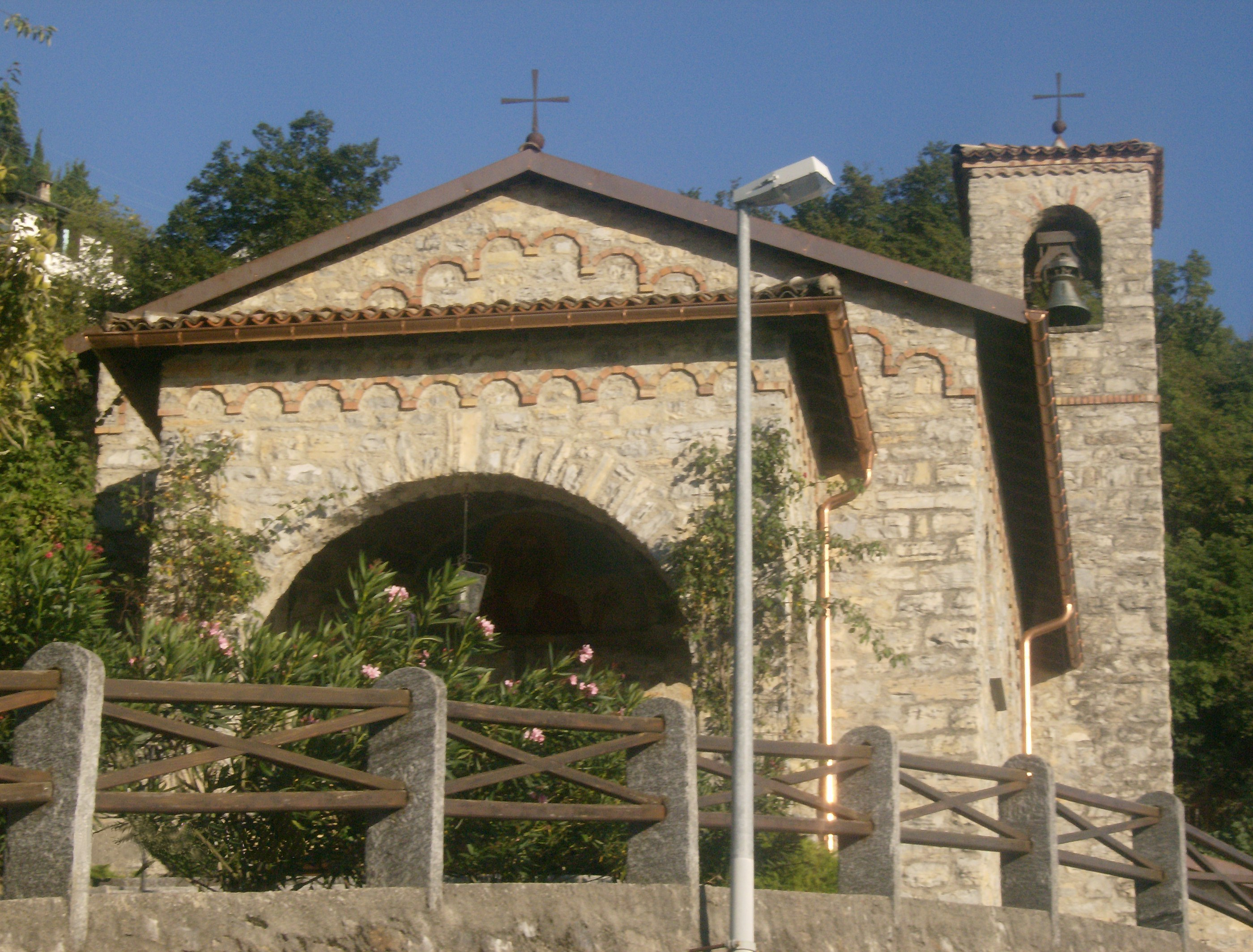
The Oratory of the Immaculate Heart of Mary in Aldesago.

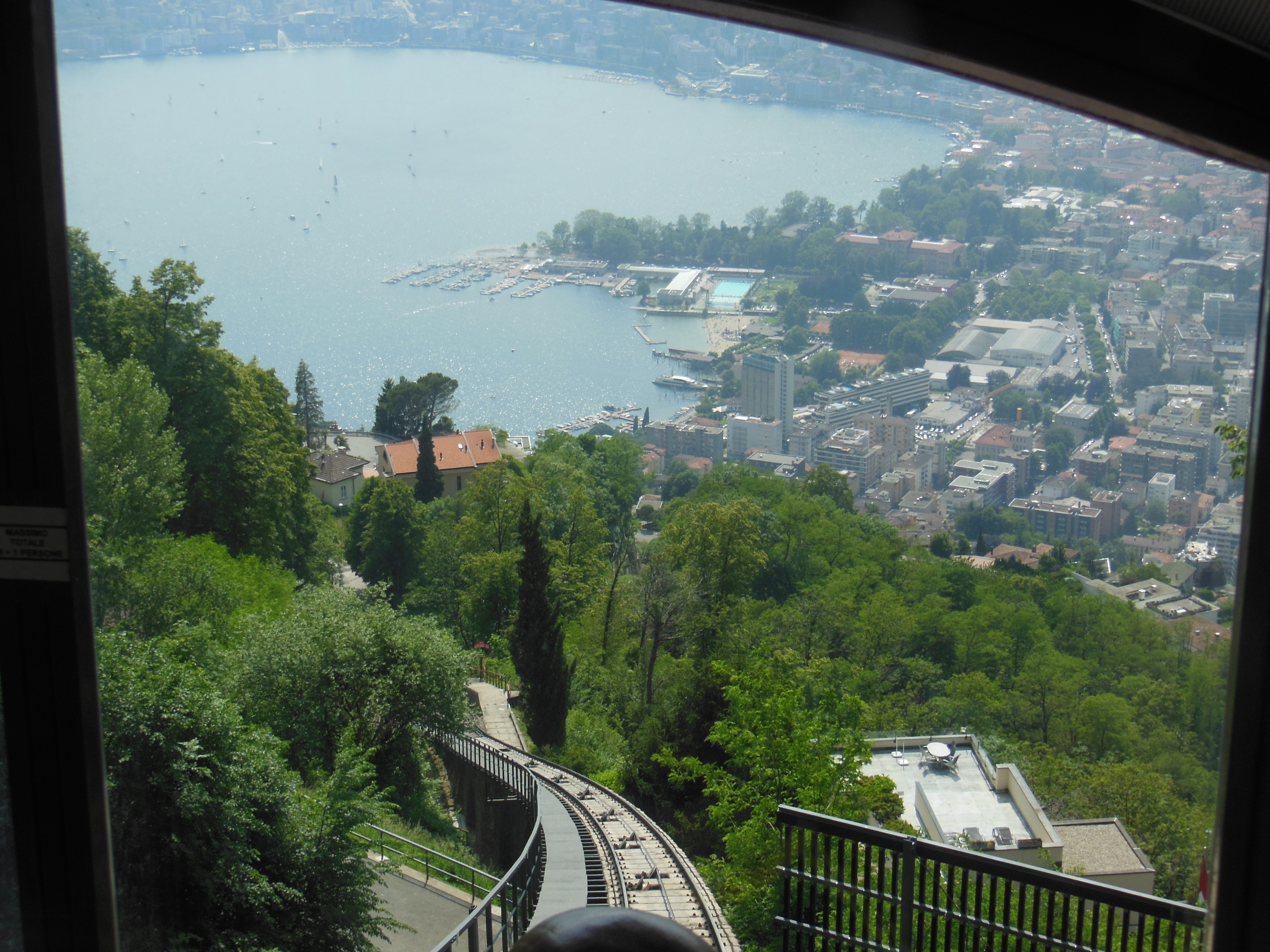
View from a funicular car approaching the Aldesago stop, just visible over the road bridge.

Aldesago is a village on the western slopes of the mountain of Monte Brè, in the Swiss canton of Ticino. Politically the village forms part of the Brè-Aldesago quarter of the city of Lugano, although until 1972 Brè-Aldesago was an independent municipality.

Aldesago is accessed by a steep and winding road from Lugano. This road then crosses the southern slopes of Monte Brè to reach the village of Brè. Trasporti Pubblici Luganesi (TPL) bus route 12 operates along this road from Lugano city centre to Brè village, with one or two buses per hour. The Monte Brè funicular, which connects the Lugano suburb of Cassarate, itself served by frequent city buses, to the summit of Monte Brè, serves a stop in Aldesago and runs every half-hour.

The church in Aldesago was first mentioned in 1636, but this building was demolished in 1941 to make way for road works. The replacement church, known as the Oratory of the Immaculate Heart of Mary, was consecrated in 1943.
