= Luigi Castagnola =

Luigi Castagnola may refer to:

- Luigi Castagnola (water polo)
- Luigi Castagnola (politician)
