= Brè =

Coordinates: 46.011432°N 8.997142°E

- Village
- Interactive map of Brè
- Country: Switzerland
- Canton: Ticino
- District: Lugano
- City: Lugano
- Quarter: Brè-Aldesago

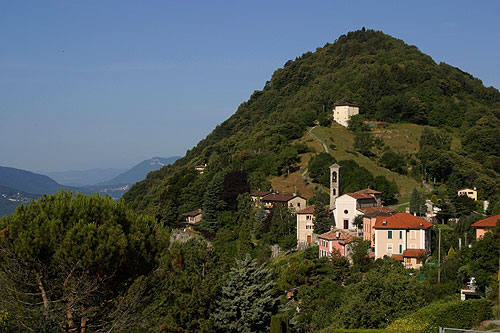
The village from the east, with the summit of Monte Brè behind.

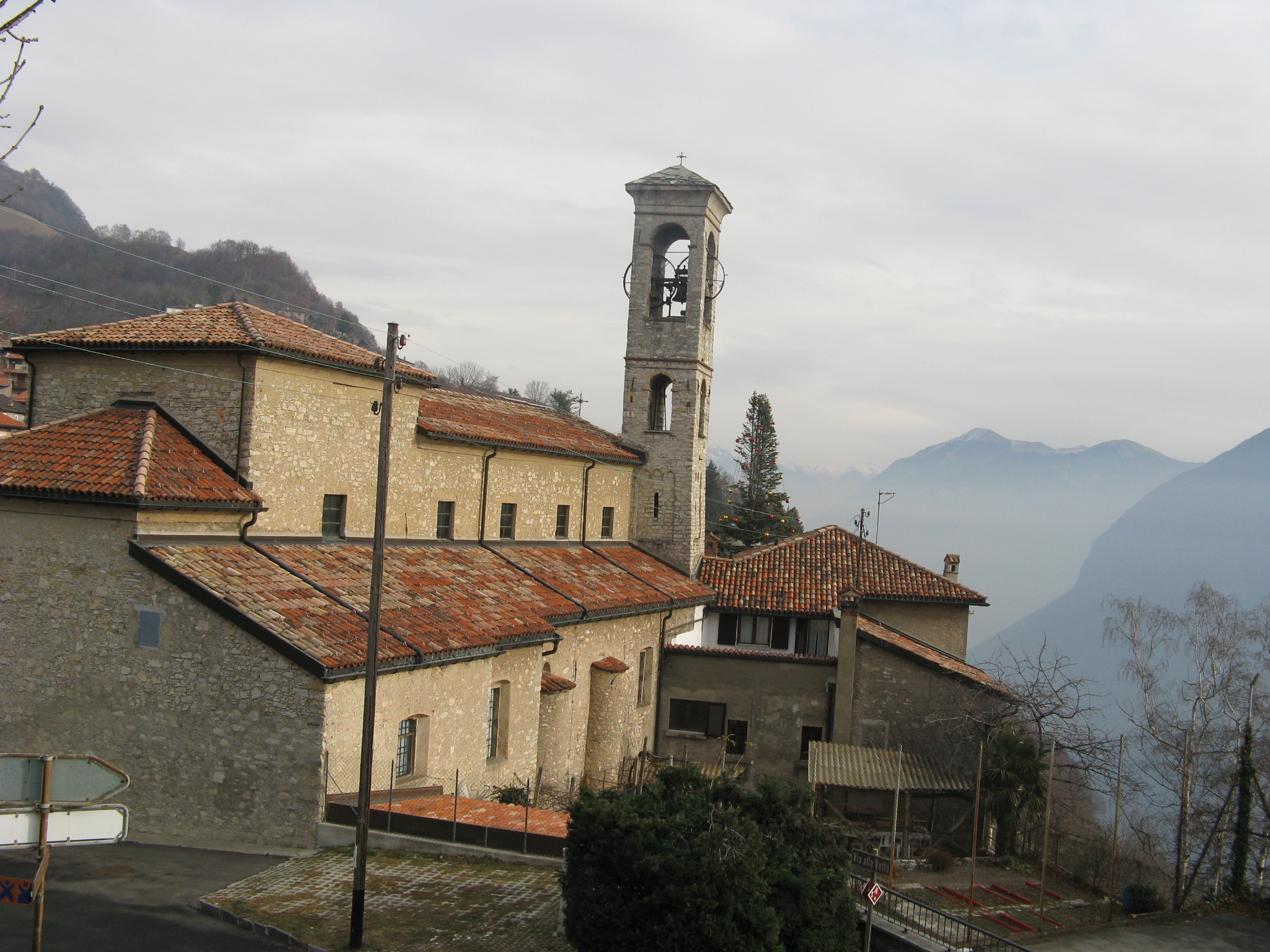
The Church of Saints Simon and Fedele in the village.

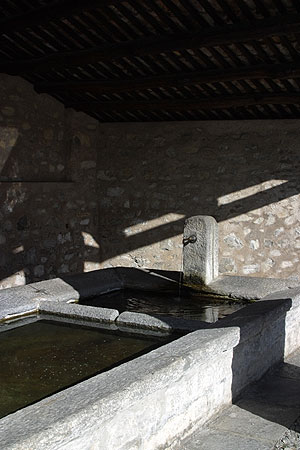
A preserved public wash house in the village.

Brè (Italian pronunciation: [brɛ]) is a village on the eastern slopes of the mountain of Monte Brè, in the Swiss canton of Ticino. Politically the village forms part of the Brè-Aldesago quarter of the city of Lugano, although until 1972 Brè-Aldesago was an independent municipality, known simply as Brè until 1953.

The village of Brè was first recorded in 1280 as de Bre, and for most of its history has lived by agriculture and livestock. Until 1912, the only access to the village was on foot or by mule, but in that year Brè was reached by a road from Lugano, and the Monte Brè funicular was opened between Lugano and the summit of Monte Brè. Subsequently Brè has become a resort and residential suburb.

Brè is accessed by a steep and winding road from Lugano. This first climbs to the village of Aldesago, before crossing the southern slopes of Monte Brè to reach Brè village. Trasporti Pubblici Luganesi (TPL) bus route 12 operates along this road from Lugano city centre to Brè village, with one or two buses per hour. The Monte Brè funicular, which connects the Lugano suburb of Cassarate, itself served by frequent city buses, to the summit of Monte Brè, serves a stop known as Brè Villagio, although this is a 1 kilometre (0.62 mi) walk from the village itself. The funicular runs every half-hour.

The Wilhelm Schmid Museum, in the village, is the former residence of Wilhelm Schmid (1892–1971) and today contains a collection of his works. Schmid was the only Swiss painter of the northern Magical Realism style. The village is also home to an artistic trail that includes the works of 20 nationally and internationally acclaimed artists.

The parish church of Saints Simon and Fedele is first mentioned in 1591, in an account of a visit by Feliciano Ninguarda, then bishop of Como. It is believed, however, to date back to medieval times, and the tower, located in the southeast corner of the basilica, has Romanesque blind arches on its base. The church contains artistic works from different eras, including 17th-century frescos and 20th-century paintings by Jozeph Birò, a Hungarian painter and one-time resident of the village.
