= Francesco De Lorenzi =

Italian painter (1827–1900)

Francesco De Lorenzi (1827 – June 16, 1900) was an Italian painter, mainly of ornamental fresco decoration.

== Biography ==
He was born in Varese. After studying at the Brera Academy of Milan, he settled in Genoa. There he worked under Nicolo Barabino in a number of projects, including painting inside the church of the Madonna dell’Olivo. He decorated a number of palaces and private homes, including that of Celesia on via Assarotti, Pallavicino, Rubattino, Orsini in Via Roma, and Pignone in Sal. Santa Caterina. Some of the frescoes, including that on the Palazzo Centurione of Sampierdarena, were on external facades, and have since disappeared. He also painted for houses of worship, including the Oratory of SS. Pietro e Paolo, and the parish churches of Sampierdarena, Varazze, and Rivarolo Canavese). He traveled to Poland to decorate some portion of the Vilnius Castle Complex. He helped decorate the pavilion at the Exposition of Nice in 1884. He was named academic of merit at the Accademia Ligustica of Genoa, where for many years he taught ornamentation. He died from a fall from a scaffolding while painting the cupola of the church at Campomorone.
