= Castagnola, Switzerland =

Coordinates: 46.003446°N 8.977568°E

Castagnola
- Village
- Interactive map of Castagnola
- Country: Switzerland
- Canton: Ticino
- District: Lugano
- City: Lugano
- Quarter: Castagnola-Cassarate

Castagnola is a village on the northern shore of Lake Lugano, below the mountain of Monte Brè, in the Swiss canton of Ticino. Politically the village forms part of the Castagnola-Cassarate quarter of the city of Lugano, although until 1972 Castagnola-Cassarate was an independent municipality under the name Castagnola.

Castagnola was first recorded in 1335 as Castigniola.

Amongst its notable residents is the artist Angela Lyn. and Latvian poet couple Rainis and Aspazija, who lived here from 1905–20. Carlo Cattaneo, Italian writer and philosopher, died here in 1869.
