= Castagnole =

Castagnole may refer to several places in Italy:

- Castagnole delle Lanze, a municipality in the Province of Asti, Piedmont
- Castagnole Monferrato, a municipality in the Province of Asti, Piedmont
- Castagnole Piemonte, a municipality in the Province of Turin, Piedmont
- Castagnole (Paese), a civil parish of Paese, province of Treviso, Veneto

== See also ==
- Castagnola (disambiguation)
