= Nicolò Barabino =

Italian painter

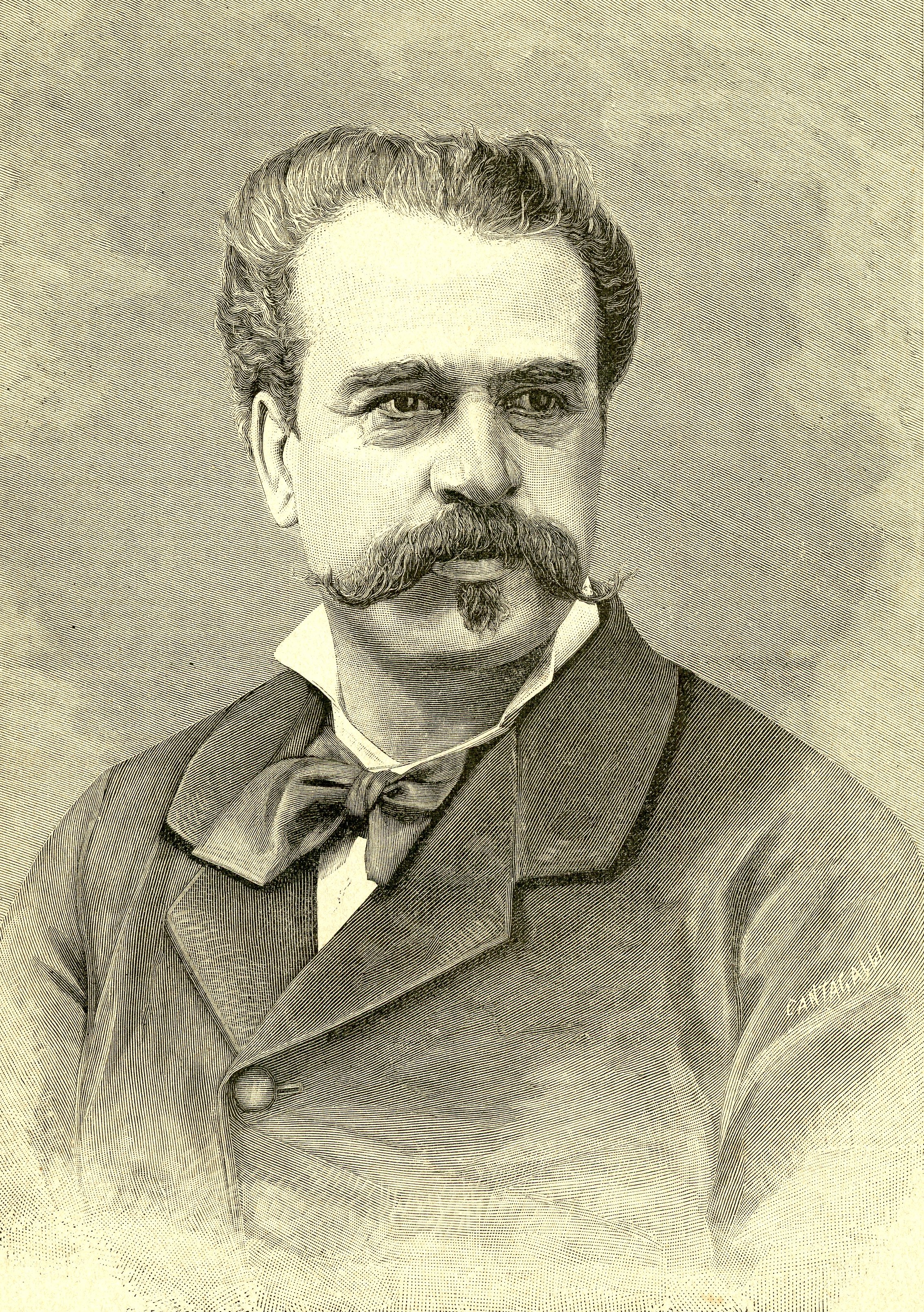
Nicolò Barabino

Nicolò Barabino (13 June 1832 – 19 October 1891) was an Italian academic painter of religious and historical subjects, active in Florence and Genoa.

== Biography ==
He was born in Sampierdarena. His initial studies were at the Genovese Accademia Ligustica di Belle Arti, under Giuseppe Isola. In Genoa, he befriended Maurizio Dufour. In 1857, he won the Durazzo scholarship to attend the Accademia di Belle Arti in Florence. He designed some of the lunettes completed as mosaics for the portals of the Florence Cathedral. He also worked in frescoes for the City Hall of Genoa.

His first work in Florence was an altarpiece depicting the Madonna Consolatrice degli afflitti. He also frescoed the church of Riviera Ligure, and the parish church di San Giacomo di Corte in Santa Margherita Ligure. In 1856 he exhibited in Florence a canvas depicting the Death of Boniface VIII.

The marchesa Luisa Durazzo of Genoa commissioned a triptych for her chapel, in the church of the Concezione in Genoa. He frescoed a hall in the palazzina Celesia with the following three pictures: Galileo before the Inquisition; Piero Capponi tears up the terms offered by Carlo VIII of France, and The Sicilian Vespers. He also provided frescoes for the Hospital of the Duchess of Galliera, and in a hall of the palazzo of signor Pignone in Genoa.

The lawyer Tito Orsini commissioned large historical canvases for his palazzo Orsini, representing: Galileo in Arcetri, Galileo ill surrounded by pupils; Columbus before Council of Salamanca, and Archimedes and Alessandro Volta. The painting of Galileo won a fourth prize at the Esposizione Nazionale of Turin in 1880.

In 1884, he aided the government during a cholera epidemic. He was knighted as a Cavaliere dell'Ordine del Merito Civile di Savoia. One of his pupils was Francesco De Lorenzi. He died in Florence.

== Gallery ==
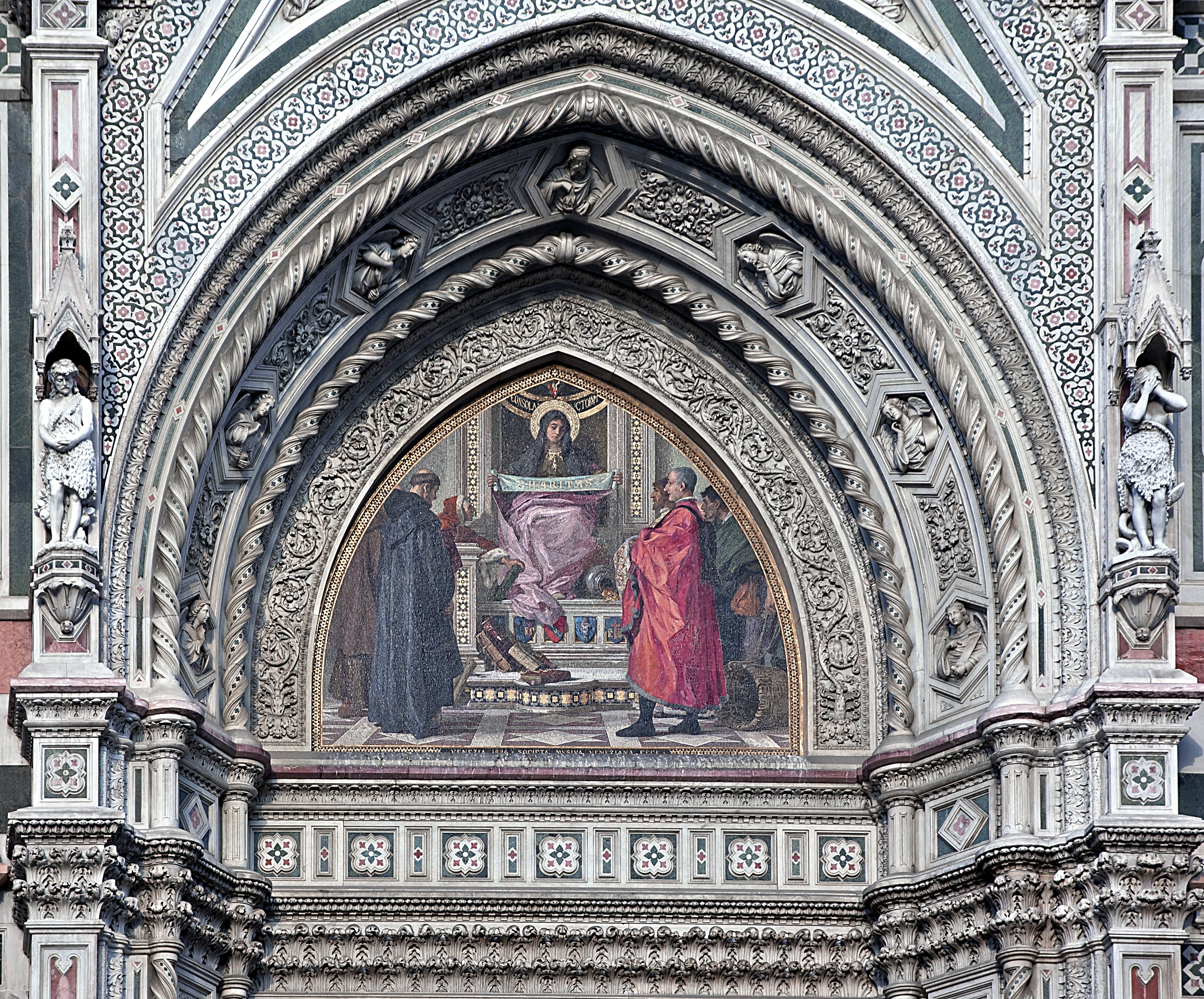
Mosaic Left Tympanum of Cathedral of Florence

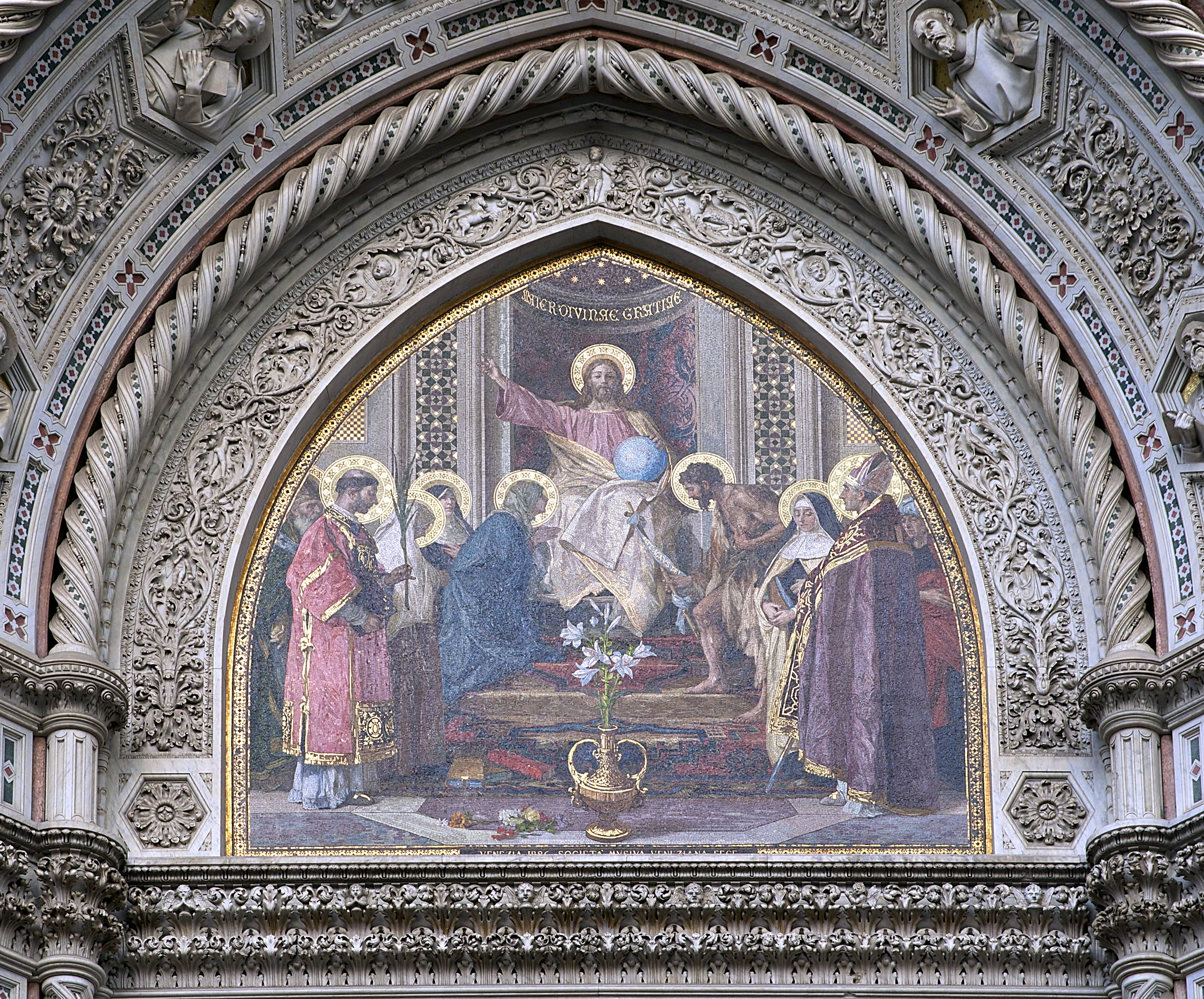
Mosaic Central Tympanum of Cathedral of Florence

Mosaic Right Tympanum of Cathedral of Florence
