= Monte Brè funicular =

Funicular railway above Lake Lugano, Ticino, Switzerland

Coordinates: 46.006214°N 8.970364°E

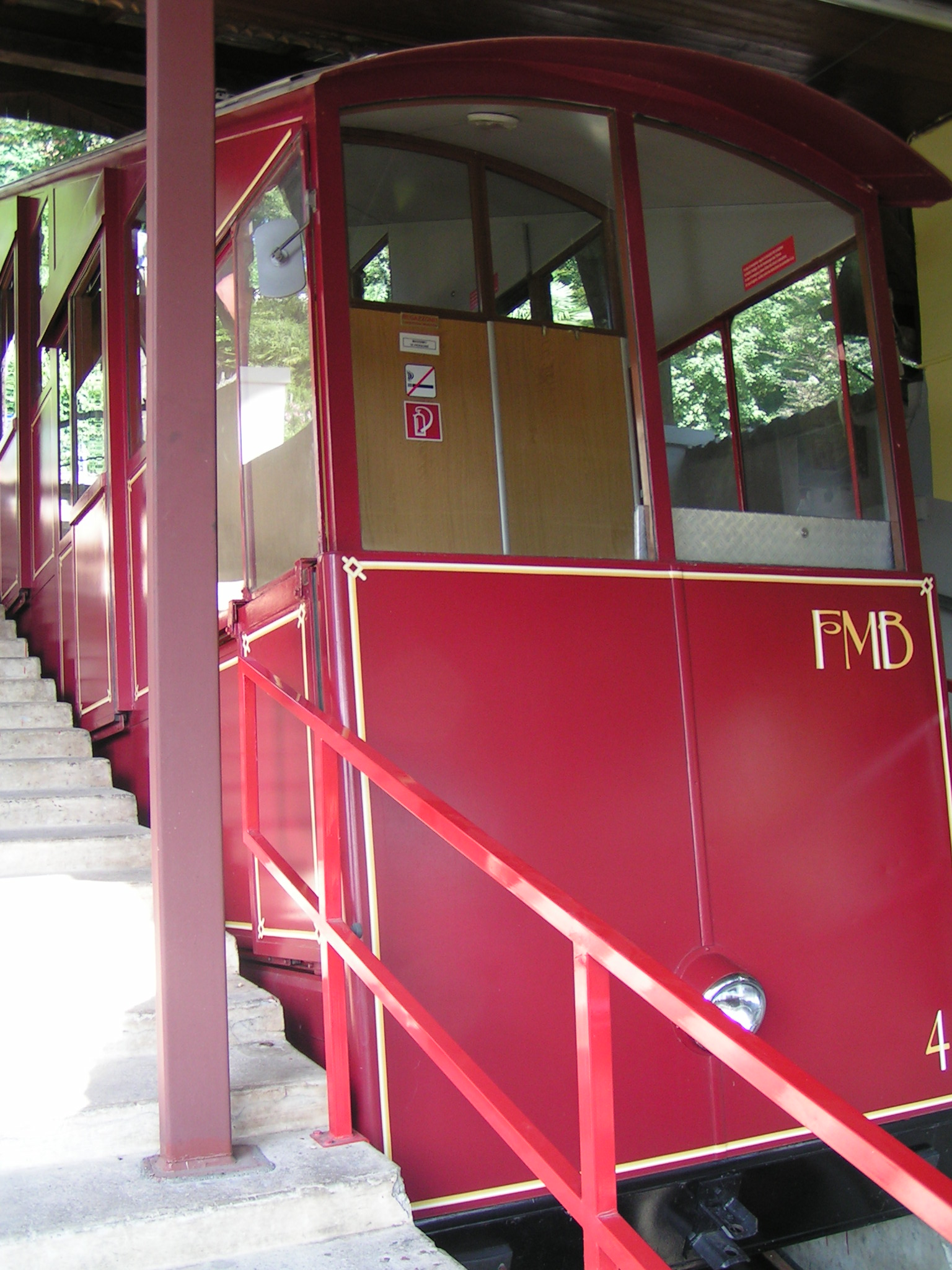
- Upper section car

Overview
- Other name: Funicolare Cassarate-Monte Brè
- Status: in operation
- Owner: Società Funicolare Cassarate-Monte Brè SA (Note: In 2019, "SA" was added and changed to uppercase: "SOCIETÀ FUNICOLARE CASSARATE-MONTE BRÈ SA")
- Locale: Ticino, Switzerland
- Termini: "Cassarate"; "Monte Brè"
- Stations: 6 (including Suvigliana, Albonago, Aldesago, "Brè Villaggio")

Service
- Type: Funicular with 2 sections
- Operator(s): Società Funicolare Cassarate-Monte Brè SA
- Rolling stock: 4 (2 on each section)

History
- Opened: 10 June 1908; 117 years ago (first section); 17 February 1912 (second section)
- Enhancements: 1959, 1984

Technical
- Track length: 1,599 metres (5,246 ft)
- Number of tracks: 1 each section with a passing loop
- Track gauge: Metre (3 ft 3 3/8 in)
- Electrification: from opening
- Highest elevation: 883 m (2,897 ft)
- Maximum incline: 60.5%
Route map
Map

The Monte Brè funicular, or Funicolare Cassarate - Monte Brè, is a funicular railway in the city of Lugano in the Swiss canton of Ticino. The line links a lower station in the Lugano suburb of Cassarate with an upper station at 883 m (2,897 ft) near the summit of the Monte Brè. The top yields views of the city and Lake Lugano.

The funicular is composed of two separate and independent sections. The first section links the stops of Cassarate and Suvigliana and is only 196 metres (643 ft) long. At Suvigliana passengers must cross the road to reach the lower station of the second, and significantly longer, section. This section is 1,403 metres (4,603 ft) long, and is very sinuous with further intermediate stops of Albonago, Aldesago and Brè Villaggio. The first three intermediate stops serve the villages of Suvigliana, Albonago and Aldesago, all of which are on the western flank of Monte Brè, whilst the Brè Villaggio stop is linked to the village of Brè on the eastern flank by a 1-kilometre (0.6 mi) long path.

The Monte Brè funicular is one of three operational funiculars within the Lugano area. The other two are the Monte San Salvatore funicular, which ascends Monte San Salvatore on the opposite side of the city, and the Lugano Città–Stazione funicular, which links the city centre with the railway station.

== History ==
The concession for the construction of the funicular was granted in 1905, with the intention of creating a resort where the inhabitants of Lugano could, without abandoning their businesses, enjoy the cool during the heat of summer, along with the views. The lower section opened in 1908, with the upper section following in 1912.

In 1959, the cars of the lower section were replaced with the new metal-bodied cars in a then-modern style, with a capacity of 42 persons each. Similarly new cars were provided for the upper section in 1984, although in this case the cars had a capacity of 68 persons and were designed with a nostalgic look. In both cases, the cars are still in use.

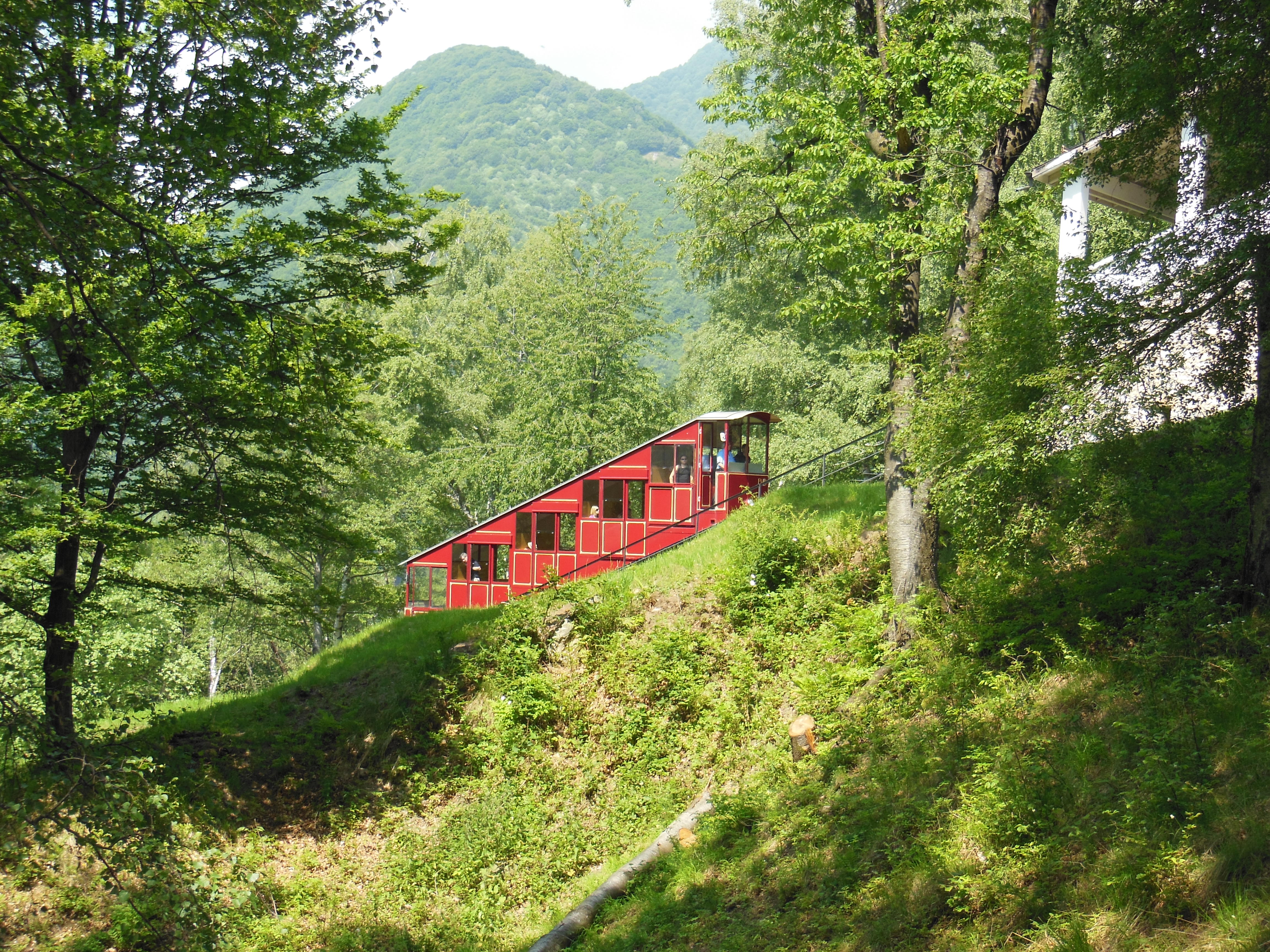
Car approaching the upper terminus of the upper section of the Monte Brè funicular

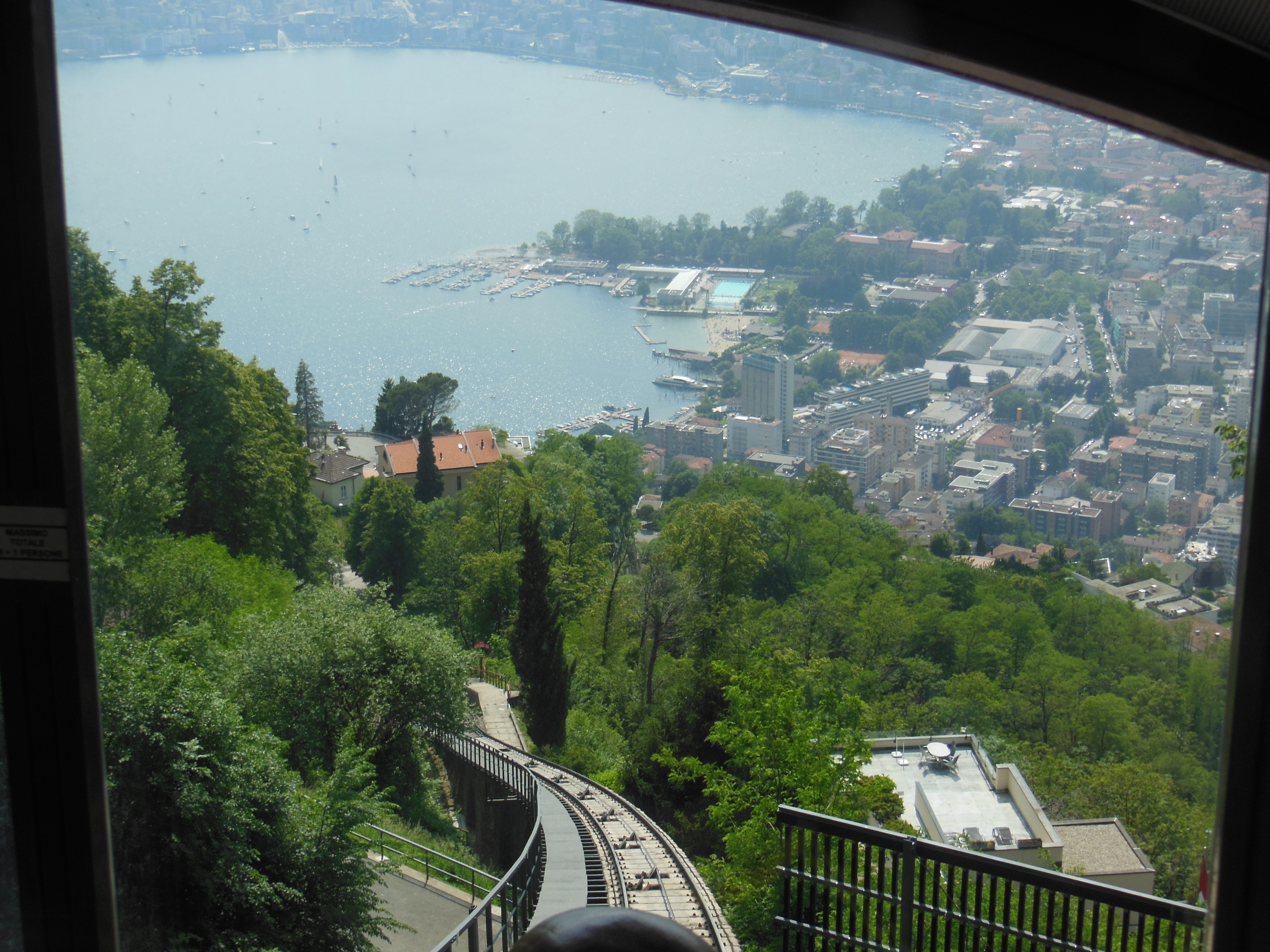
Looking downhill to Lugano from a car descending the upper section

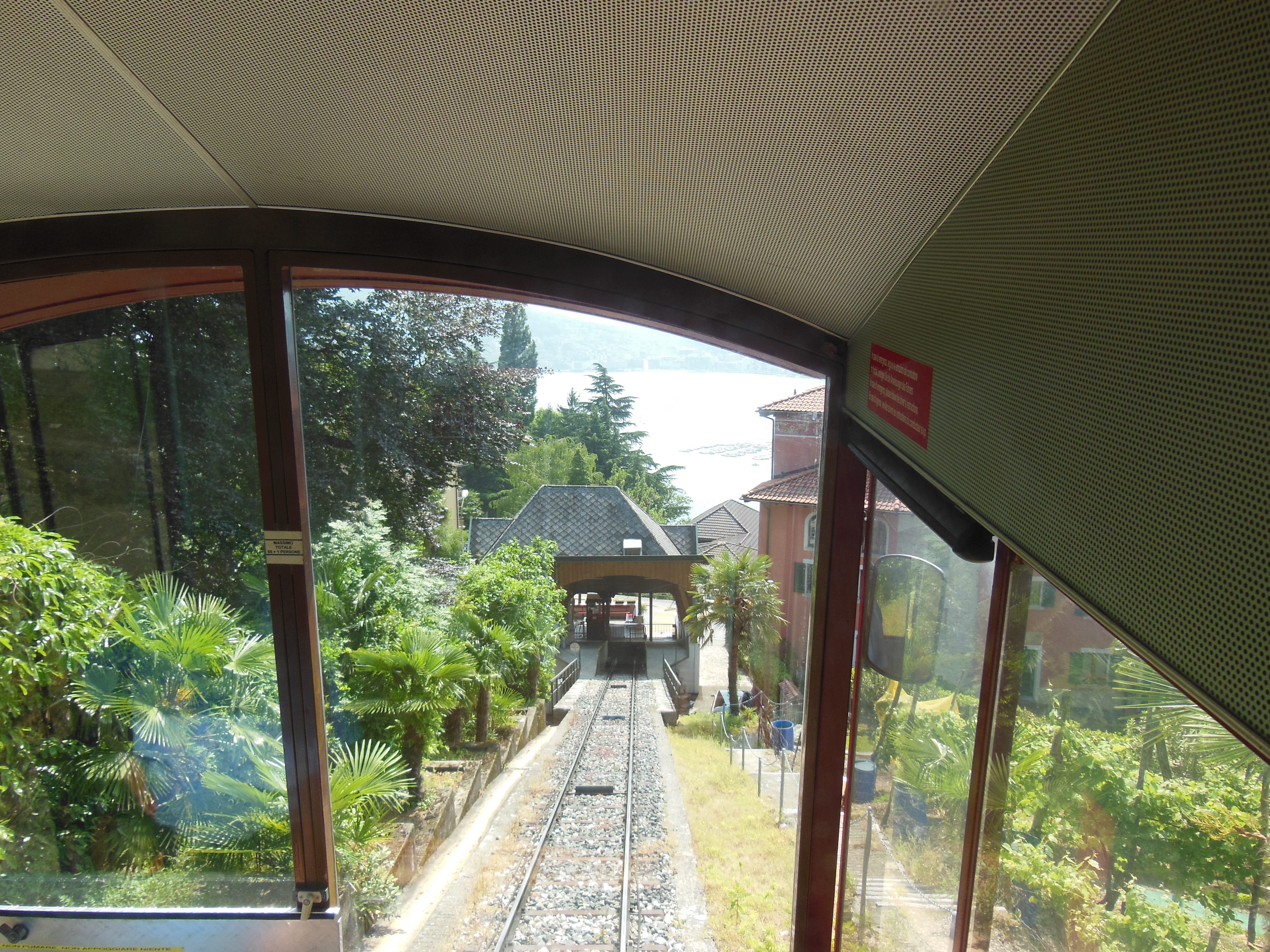
Looking downhill from a car about to enter the lower station of the upper section

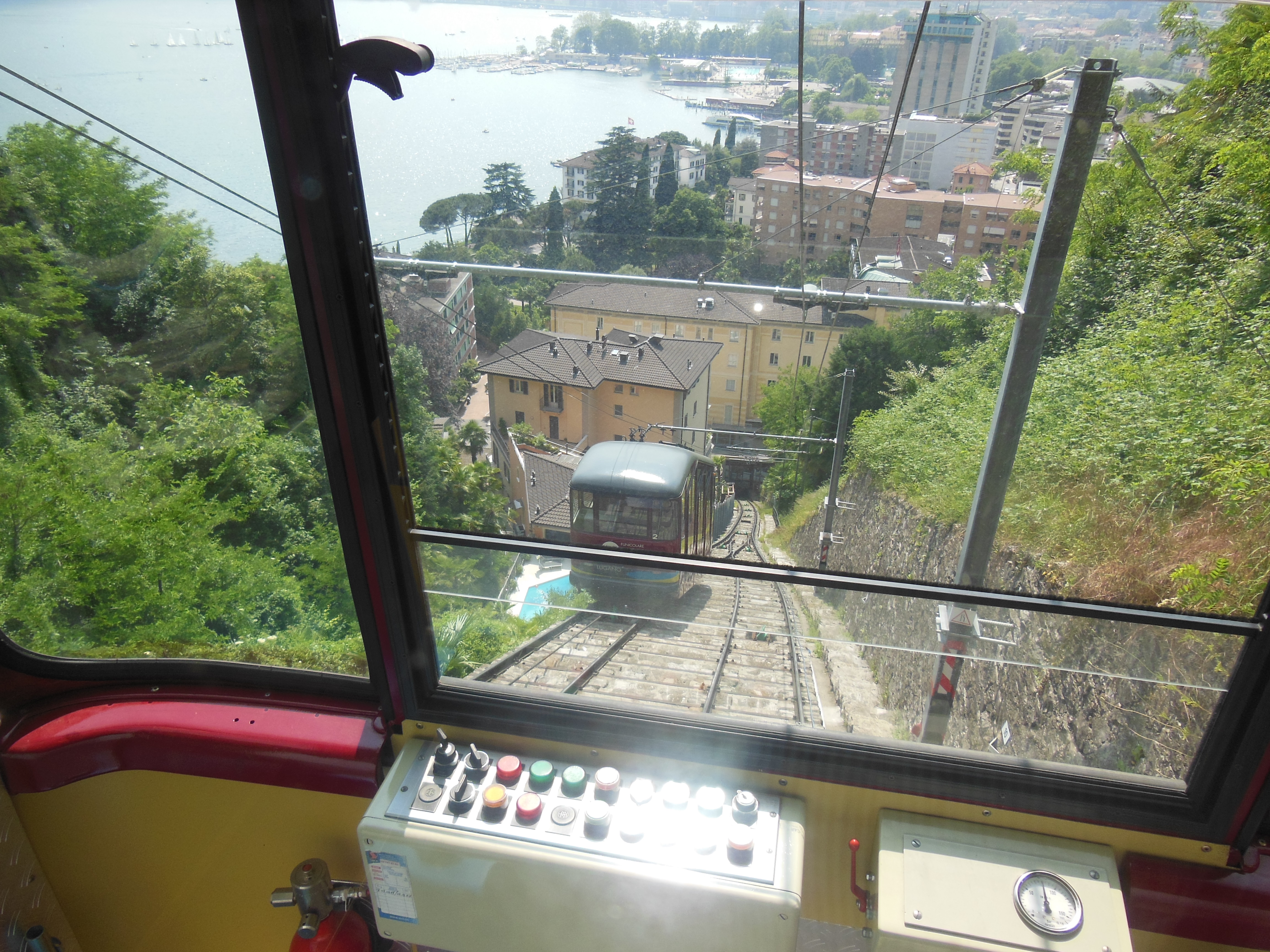
Cars at the passing loop of the lower section

== Operation ==
The line has the following parameters:

Feature	Lower section	Upper section
Number of cars	2	2
Number of stops	2	5
Configuration	Single track with passing loop	Single track with passing loop
Mode of operation	Automatic	Manual
Track length	196 metres (643 ft)	1,403 metres (4,603 ft)
Rise	102 metres (335 ft)	522 metres (1,713 ft)
Maximum gradient	60.5%	47.5%
Track gauge	1,000 mm (3 ft 3 3/8 in)	1,000 mm (3 ft 3 3/8 in)
Capacity	30 passengers per car	68 passengers per car
Maximum speed	2 metres per second (6.6 ft/s)	3 metres per second (9.8 ft/s)
Journey time	4 minutes	12 minutes
Opened	10 June 1908	17 February 1912

== See also ==
- List of funicular railways
- List of funiculars in Switzerland
