= Castagnola-Cassarate =

Coordinates: 46.003446°N 8.977568°E

- Quarter
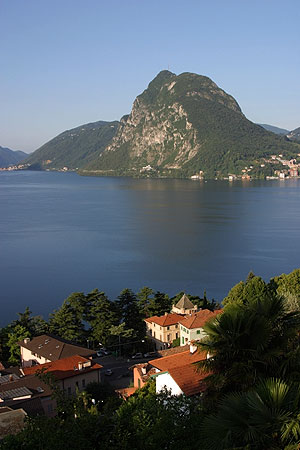

- Flag Coat of arms

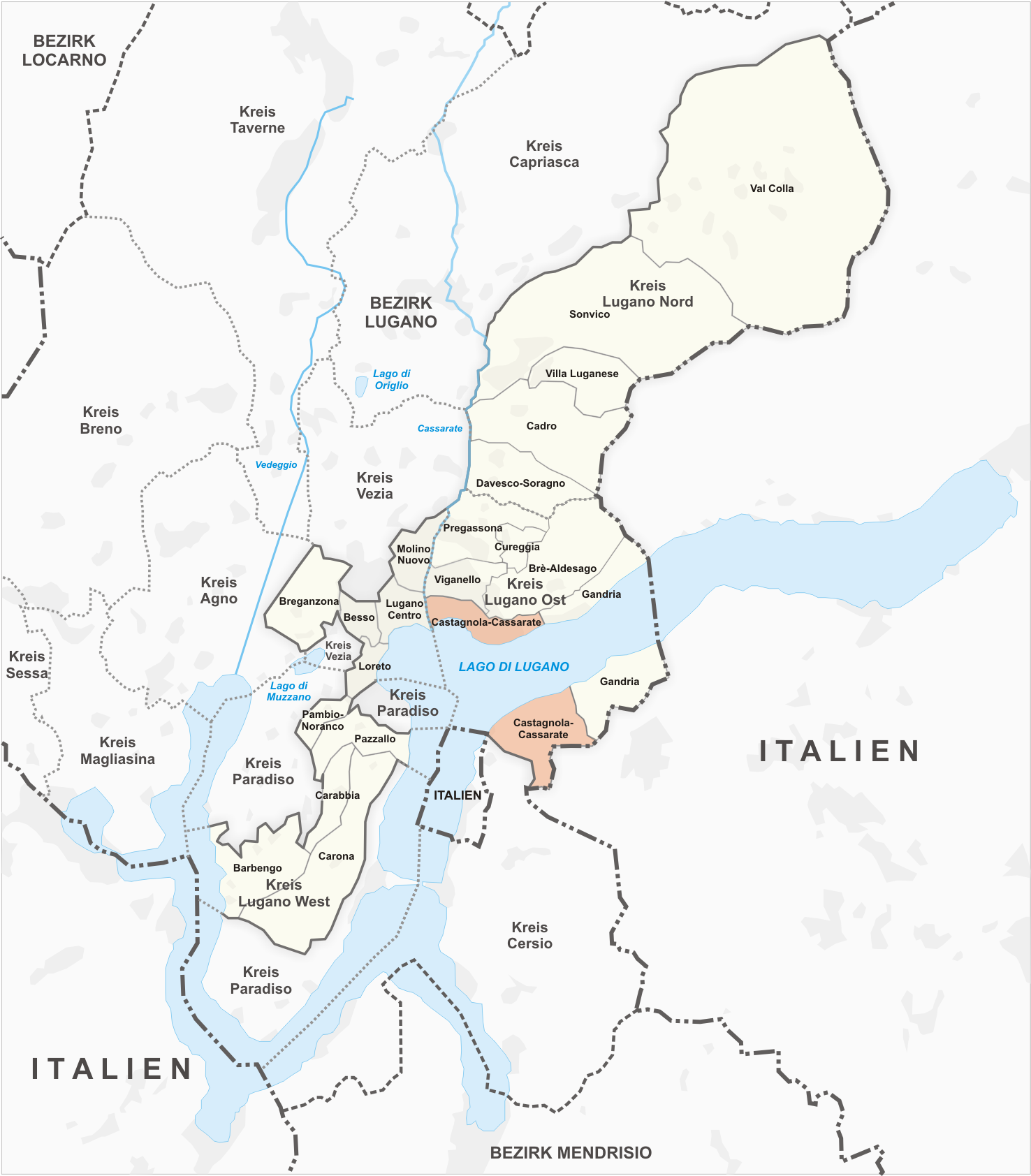
- Country: Switzerland
- Canton: Ticino
- District: Lugano
- City: Lugano

Area
  - Total: 2.97 km^{2} (1.15 sq mi)

Population (2011-12-31)
  - Total: 6,223
  - Density: 2,100/km^{2} (5,430/sq mi)

Castagnola-Cassarate is a quarter of the city of Lugano, in the Swiss canton of Ticino.

Aerial view from 300 m by Walter Mittelholzer (1919)

Until 1972, it was an independent municipality under the name Castagnola.

Castagnola-Cassarate includes the waterfront on the north side of Lake Lugano from the outfall of the Cassarate River in the west, continuing under Monte Brè to a border with Gandria in the east. It also includes waterfront areas on the opposite, southern, side of Lake Lugano, reaching up to the border with Italy at the summit of Sighignola. The villages and settlements of Caprino, Cassarate, Castagnola, Cavallino, Ruvigliana and Suvigliana are all included. It has an area of 297 hectares (730 acres) and, in 2011, it had a population of 6,167.

The municipality of Castagnola had 157 inhabitants in 1591, which increased to 214 in 1801, 419 in 1850, 1,060 in 1900, 2,926 in 1950, 4,430 in 1970, and 5,509 in 1991.
