= Gabriele Castagnola =

Italian painter (1828–1883)

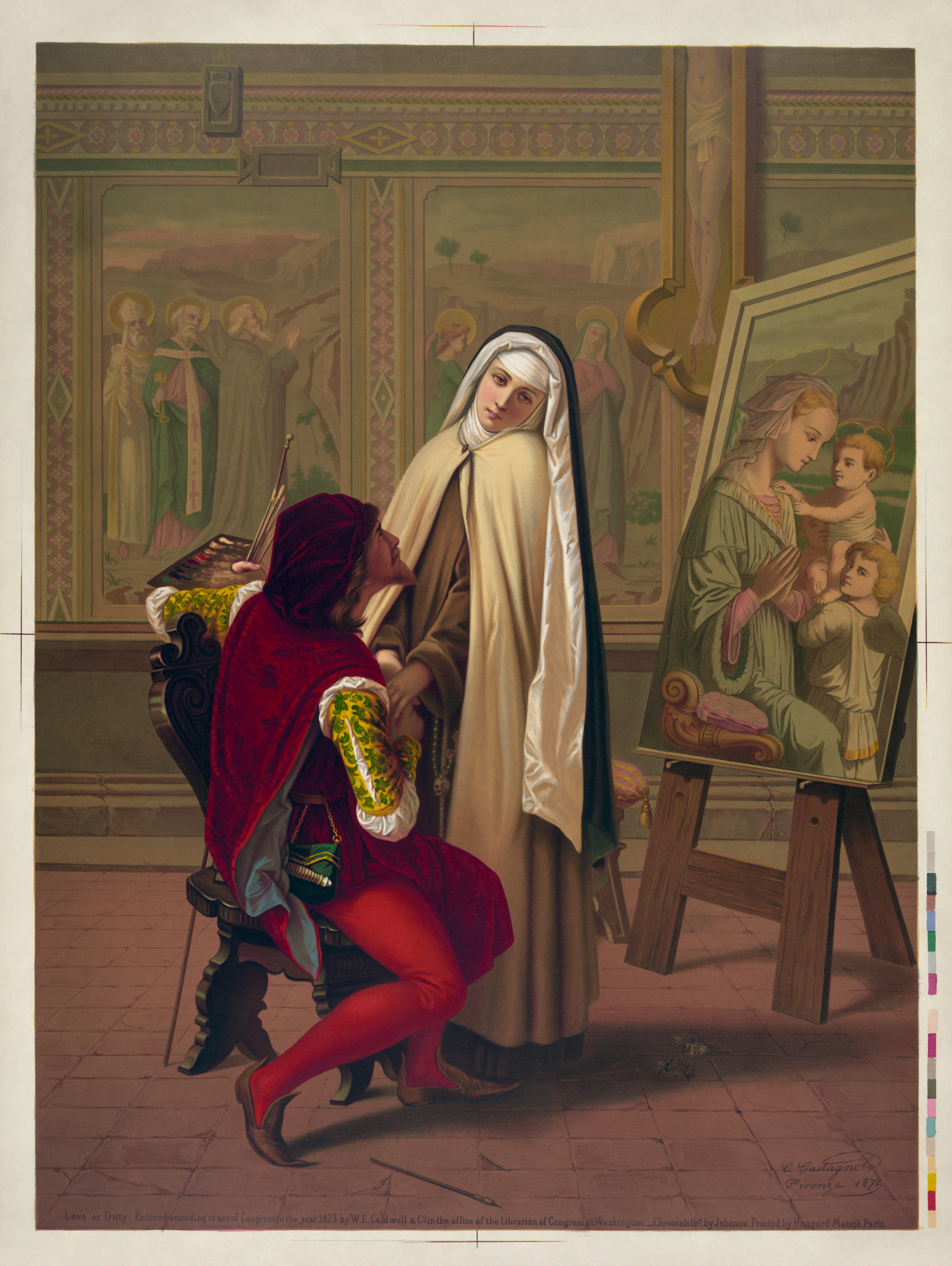
Love or Duty, an example of his chromolithography. Note the color scale on the right.

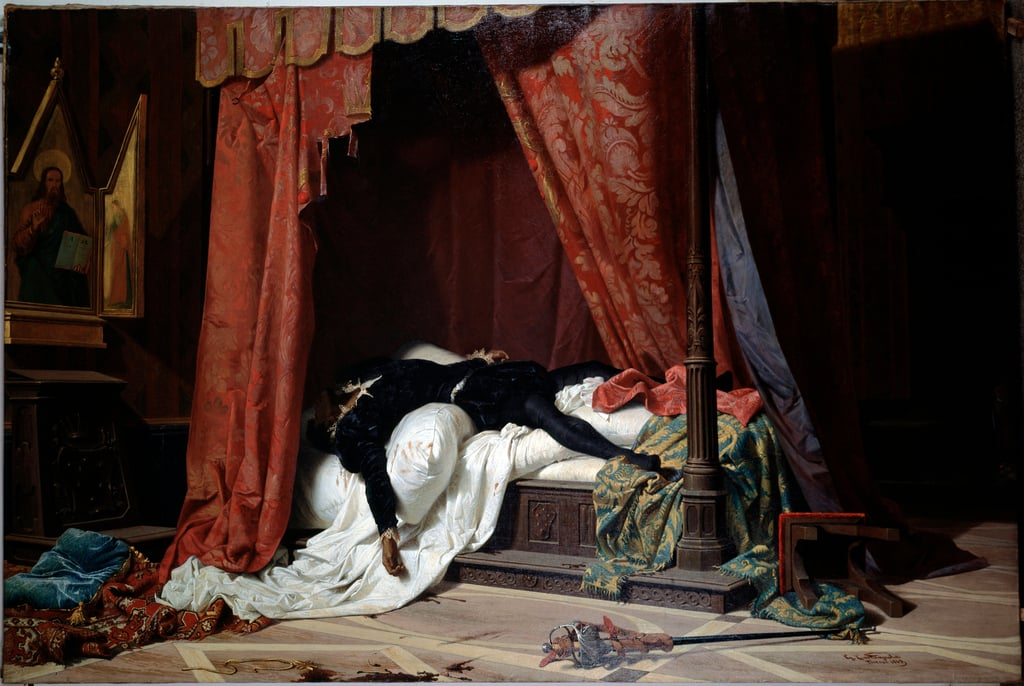
The End of Alessandro de Medici

Gabriele Castagnola (14 November 1828 – 30 August 1883) was an Italian lithographer and painter, in the academic style.

== Life and work ==
He studied at Genoa's Accademia Ligustica di Belle Arti from 1840 to 1847 then, from 1849 to 1852, he worked as a magazine illustrator.

For the next five years, he was primarily involved with creating lithographic prints. In 1858, he began to focus on paintings with historical and literary themes. This occupied him for a decade, and was his most successful period. Many of these works depicted scenes from the ongoing Risorgimento. During this time, he continued his studies. In 1860, he went to Naples to attend the private school operated by Domenico Morelli.

In 1865, he settled permanently in Florence. That same year, he was named an "Academician of Merit" at his alma mater in Genoa. Two years later, his painting of the assassination of Alessandro de'Medici was exhibited at the Exposition Universelle in Paris, at the Italian pavilion. This experience would prompt him to join with several other painters in a protest against the selection committee for works to be sent to the Exposition.

He frequented the Caffè Michelangiolo, a gathering place for the city's writers and artists, and was a close associate of the fresco painter, Nicolò Barabino, who was also from Genoa.

In his later years, he painted fewer historical scenes; preferring to focus on genre scenes instead. Many of these involved love and romance. He was also fond of portraying nuns.
