= Palazzo Doria Spinola =

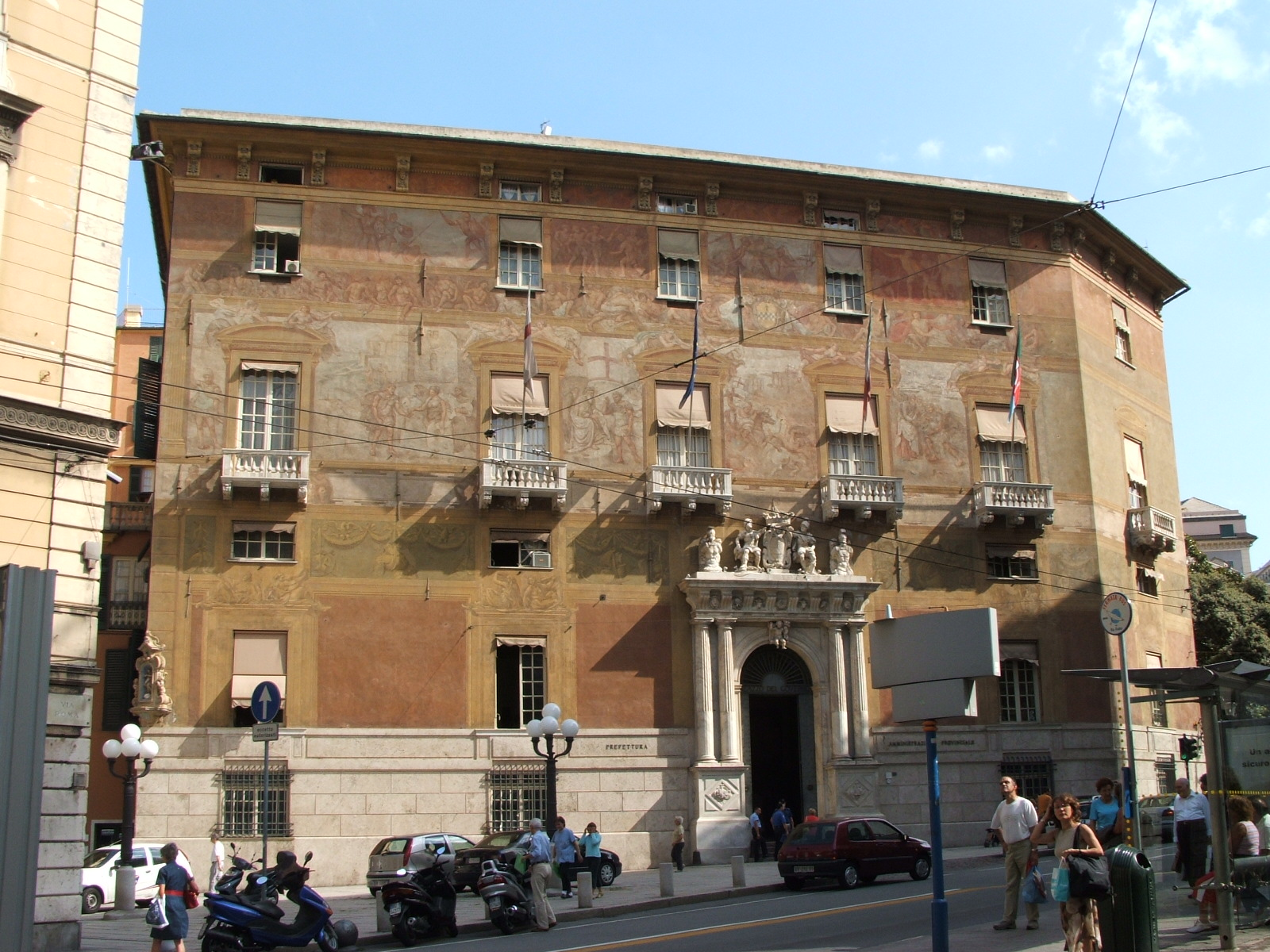
- Former names: Palazzo Antonio Doria
- Alternative names: Palazzo della Provincia

General information
- Status: In use
- Type: Palace
- Architectural style: Mannerist
- Location: Genoa, Largo Eros Lanfranco, 1, Genoa, Italy
- Coordinates: 44.4099°N 8.9373°E
- Groundbreaking: 1541
- Owner: Province of Genoa
- Landlord: Antonio Doria

Design and construction
- Architects: Bernardino Cantone, Giovan Battista Castello

UNESCO World Heritage Site
- Part of: Genoa: Le Strade Nuove and the system of the Palazzi dei Rolli
- Criteria: Cultural: (ii)(iv)
- Reference: 1211
- Inscription: 2006 (30th Session)

The Palazzo Doria-Spinola or Palazzo Antonio Doria is a palace located in largo Eros Lanfranco in the historical center of Genoa, Northwestern Italy. The palace was one of the 163 Palazzi dei Rolli of Genoa, one of those selected private residences where notable guests of the Republic of Genoa were hosted during State visits. On 13 luglio del 2006 it was added to the list of 42 palaces which now form the UNESCO World Heritage Site Genoa: Le Strade Nuove and the system of the Palazzi dei Rolli. The palace now hosts the Prefecture of Genoa and the seat of the Province of Genoa. It is possible to visit the areas of the building which are open to the public.

== The Rolli of Genoa ==
The Rolli di Genova - or, more precisely, the Rolli degli alloggiamenti pubblici di Genova (Italian for "Lists of the public lodgings of Genoa") were the official lists at the time of the Republic of Genoa of the private palaces and mansions, belonging to the most distinguished Genoese families, which - if chosen through a public lottery - were obliged to host on behalf of the Government the most notable visitors during their State visit to the Republic. Later, these palaces hosted many famous visitors to Genoa during their Grand Tour, a cultural itinerary around Italy

== History ==
Antonio Doria, cousin of the Genoese Admiral Andrea Doria, after his former residence was demolished to make way to the construction of the new walls, commissioned the palace to Bernardino Cantone and, later, to Giovan Battista Castello. The area was, at the time, immersed in nature near the demolished Acquasola Gate, which the same new walls had made redundant. At the end of the 16th century, Taddeo Carlone completed the facade with the marble portal at the main entrance. In 1624 the palace passed to the Spinola family, which expanded it to the East with a richly decorated gallery by Andrea Ansaldo, demolished in the 19th century to open via Roma. The main rooms were decorated by Giovanni and Luca Cambiaso with scenes from the Trojan War and battles between sea monsters. The palace contains a room inspired by the Gallery of Maps in the Vatican, documenting the achievements of the Doria family and, in particular, of the first owner Antonio Doria, who worked as strategist for the Spanish Crown. In 1877, the palace became the seat of the Province of Genoa and the Prefecture.

== See also ==
- Genoa: Le Strade Nuove and the system of the Palazzi dei Rolli
- List of World Heritage Sites in Italy
- Genoa
- Doria
- Spinola

== Bibliography ==
- Gioconda Pomella (2007), Guida Completa ai Palazzi dei Rolli Genova, Genova, De Ferrari Editore( ISBN 9788871728155)
- Mauro Quercioli (2008), I Palazzi dei Rolli di Genova, Roma, Libreria dello Stato ( ISBN 9788824011433)
- Fiorella Caraceni Poleggi (2001), Palazzi Antichi e Moderni di Genova raccolti e disegnati da Pietro Paolo Rubens (1652), Genova, Tormena Editore ( ISBN 9788884801302)
- Mario Labò (2003), I palazzi di Genova di P.P. Rubens, Genova, Nuova Editrice Genovese

== Gallery ==
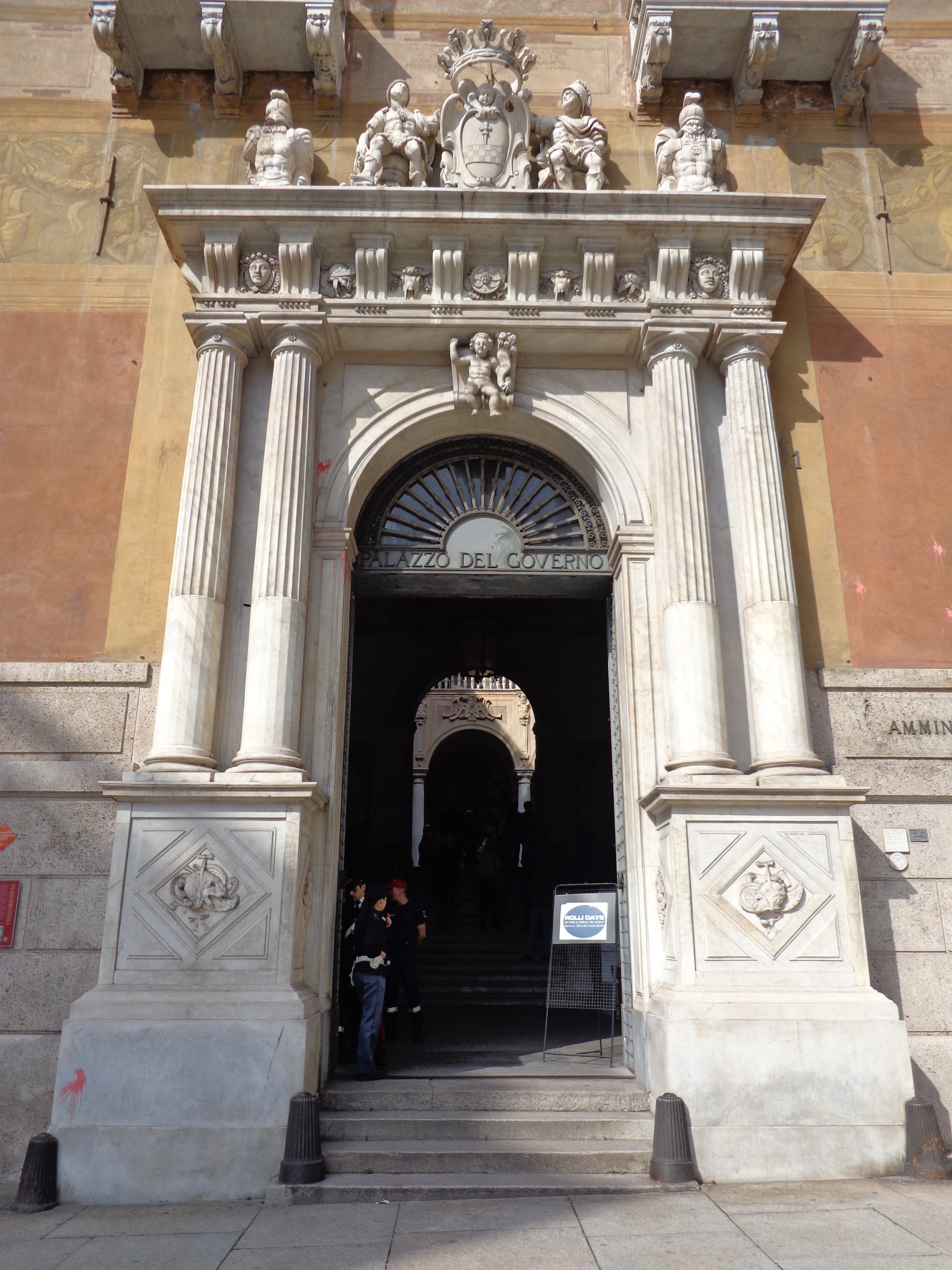
Palazzo Doria Spinola, Genoa

Palazzo Doria Spinola, Genoa

Palazzo Doria Spinola, Genoa

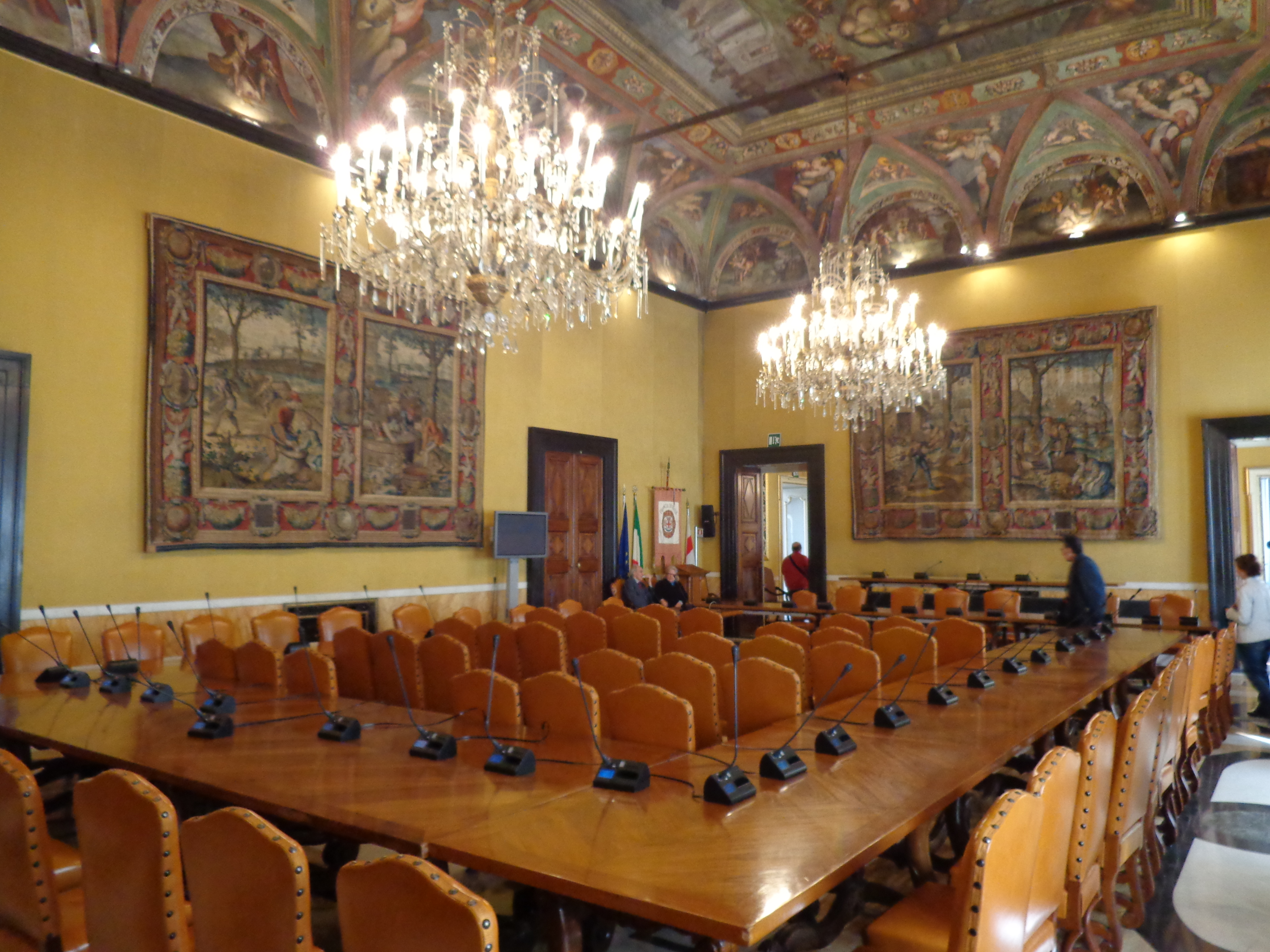
Palazzo Doria Spinola, Genoa

Palazzo Doria Spinola, Genoa

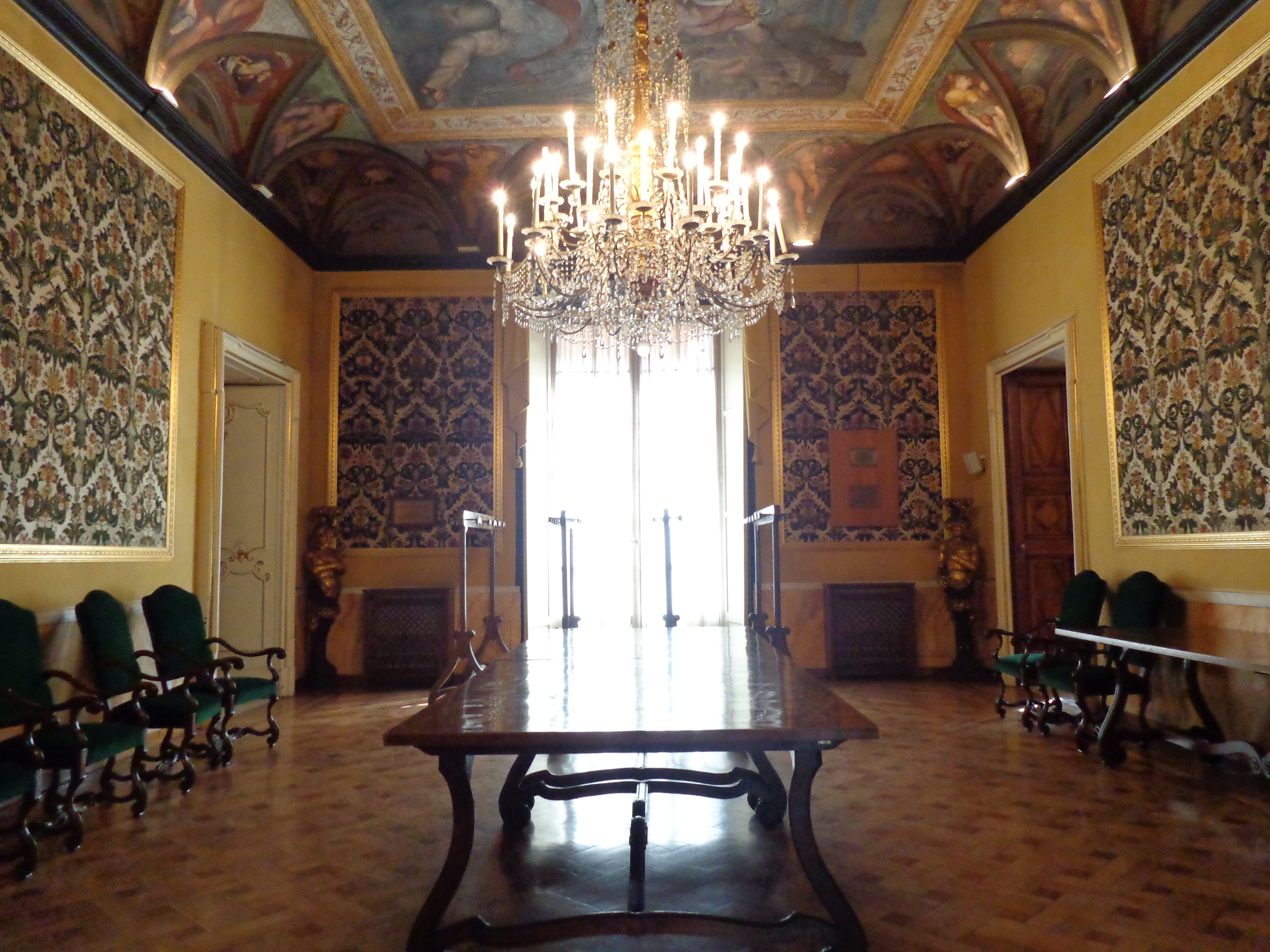
Palazzo Doria Spinola, Genoa

Palazzo Doria Spinola, Genoa

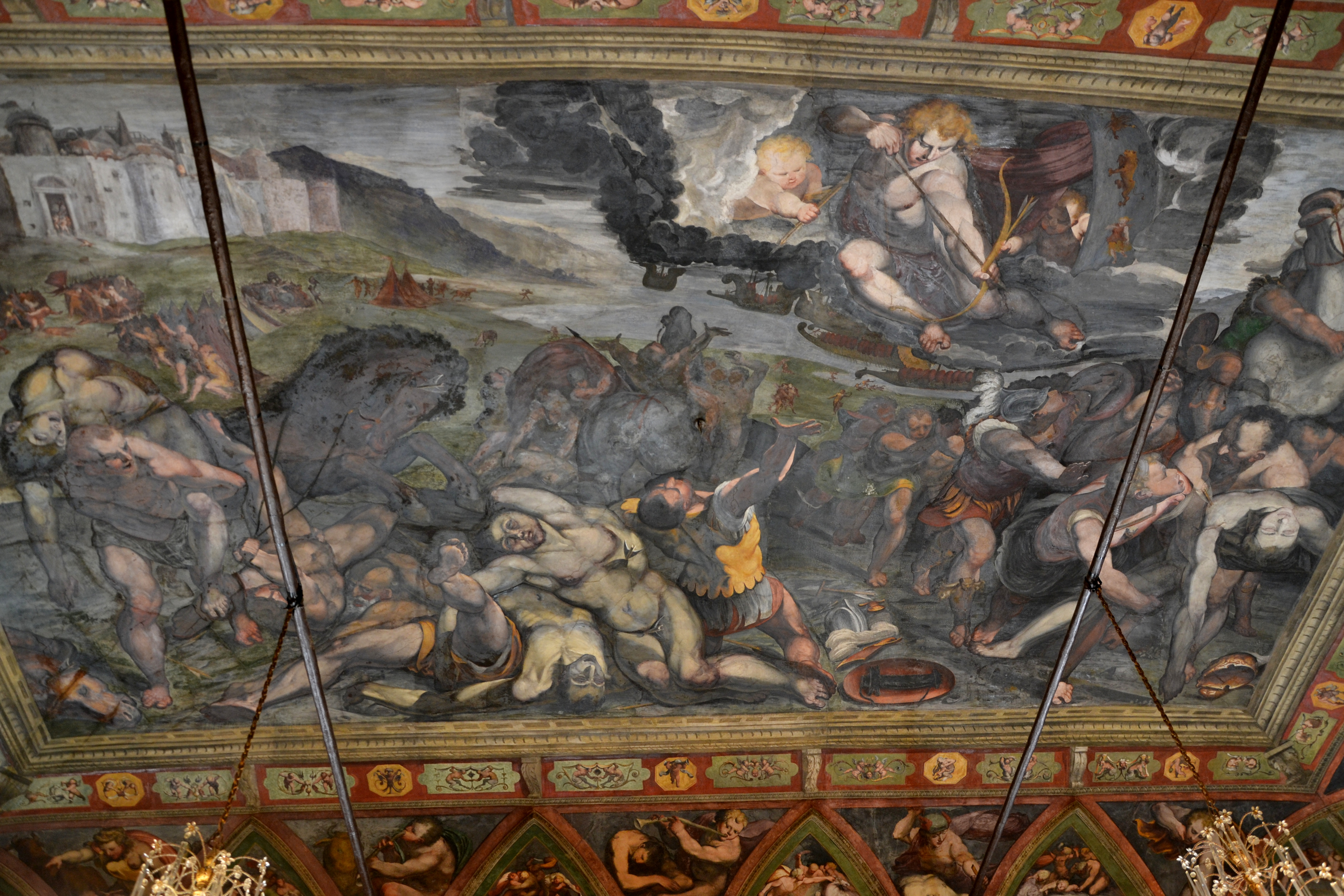
Palazzo Doria Spinola, Genoa

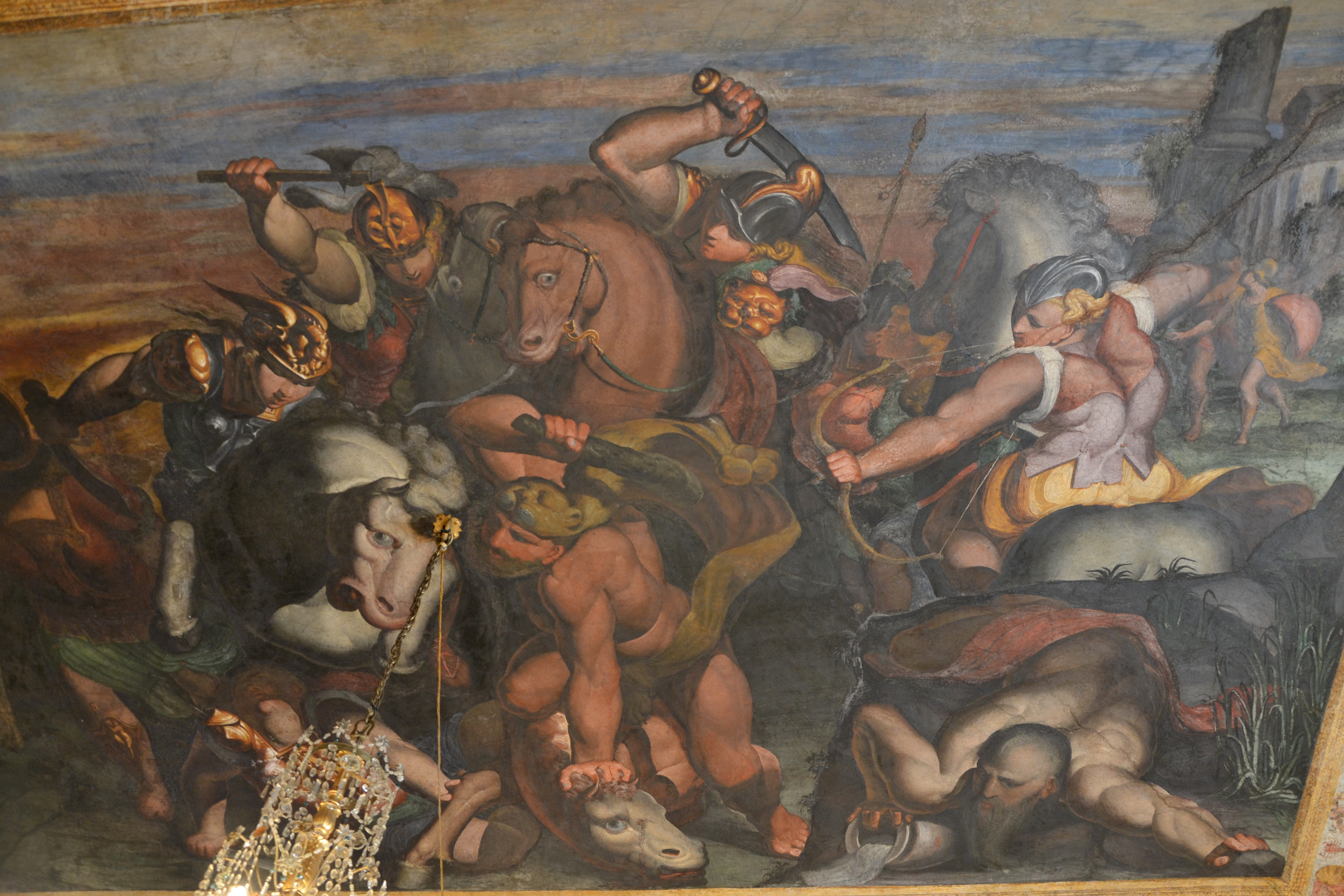
Palazzo Doria Spinola, Genoa

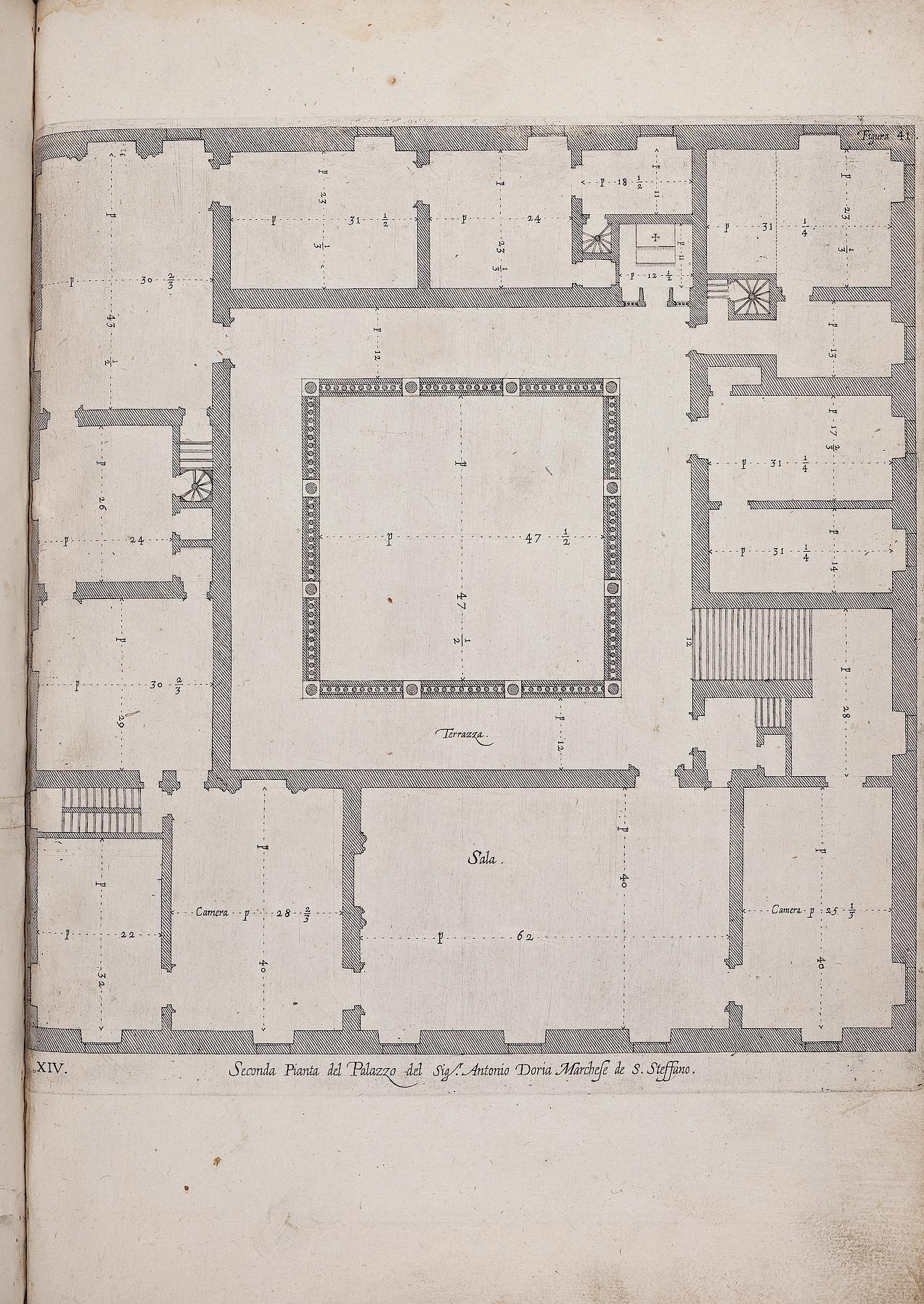
Palazzo Doria Spinola, Genoa
