= Castagnola's =

Defunct restaurant in San Francisco, California, U.S.

- Interactive map of Castagnola's
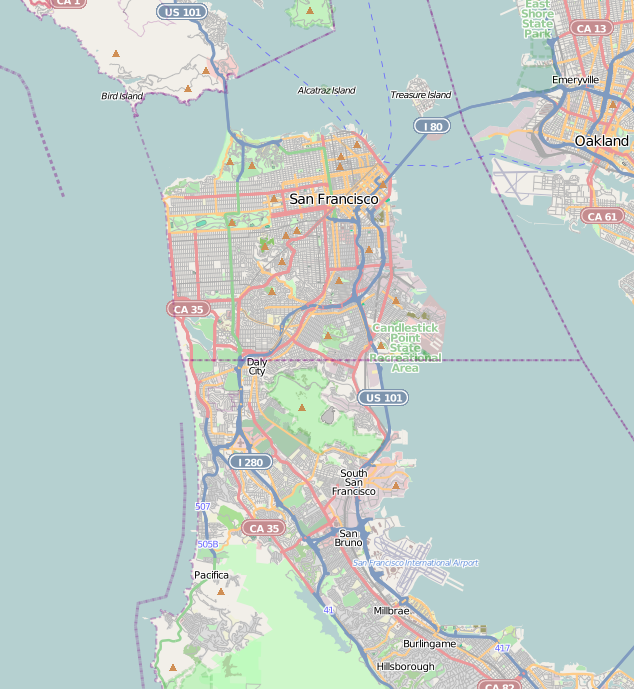
- Location within San Francisco

Restaurant information
- Established: 1916
- Closed: March 2020
- Location: 286 Jefferson Street, San Francisco, California, United States
- Coordinates: 37°48′29.7″N 122°25′3.2″W

Castagnola's was a historical restaurant in San Francisco, California, in the city's Fisherman's Wharf at 286 Jefferson Street. The restaurant was famous for its crab cocktail. It was the oldest restaurant on the Wharf.

== History ==
After founder Thomaso Castagnola introduced the crab cocktail at the Panama–California Exposition, he opened the first crab stand on Fisherman's Wharf in 1916, selling fresh crab to passersby. He and his family owned and operated the restaurant until it was sold in 1975.

Andrew Lolli, a retired U.S. Army general, purchased the restaurant from the Castagnolas. He ran the restaurant as a family business until his death in 2006. It remained in the family when his stepdaughters took over. Lolli temporarily closed the restaurant in 2001 after a labor dispute caused them to try to sell the lease.
