= Wilhelm Schmid (painter) =

Swiss artist (1892–1971)

- Born: 7 February 1892; Remigen, Switzerland
- Died: 20 November 1971 (aged 79); Brè sopra Lugano, Switzerland
- Occupation: Painter
- Known for: Painting, graphic art, mural painting
- Movement: Neue Sachlichkeit, Magic Realism

Wilhelm Schmid (7 February 1892 – 20 November 1971) was a Swiss painter associated with Neue Sachlichkeit and Magic Realism. After beginning his career in architecture, he moved to Berlin and became a co-founder of the Novembergruppe. His works included Luna, and his later work in Switzerland consisted mainly of Ticino scenes, landscapes and still lifes.

== Biography ==
Wilhelm Schmid was born on 7 February 1892 in Remigen. After training as an architectural draughtsman in Brugg, he worked as an architect in Zürich from June 1911. In 1912, Schmid moved to Berlin, where he worked in architecture offices.

Schmid exhibited in Munich and Berlin in 1916 and 1917. In 1918, he married the singer Maria Metz. He was a co-founder of the Novembergruppe, and was a member of the group from 1918 to 1922 and again from 1930 to 1933. He later gave up architecture. From 1924 to 1931, he had a studio in Paris, spending summers mainly in Provence.

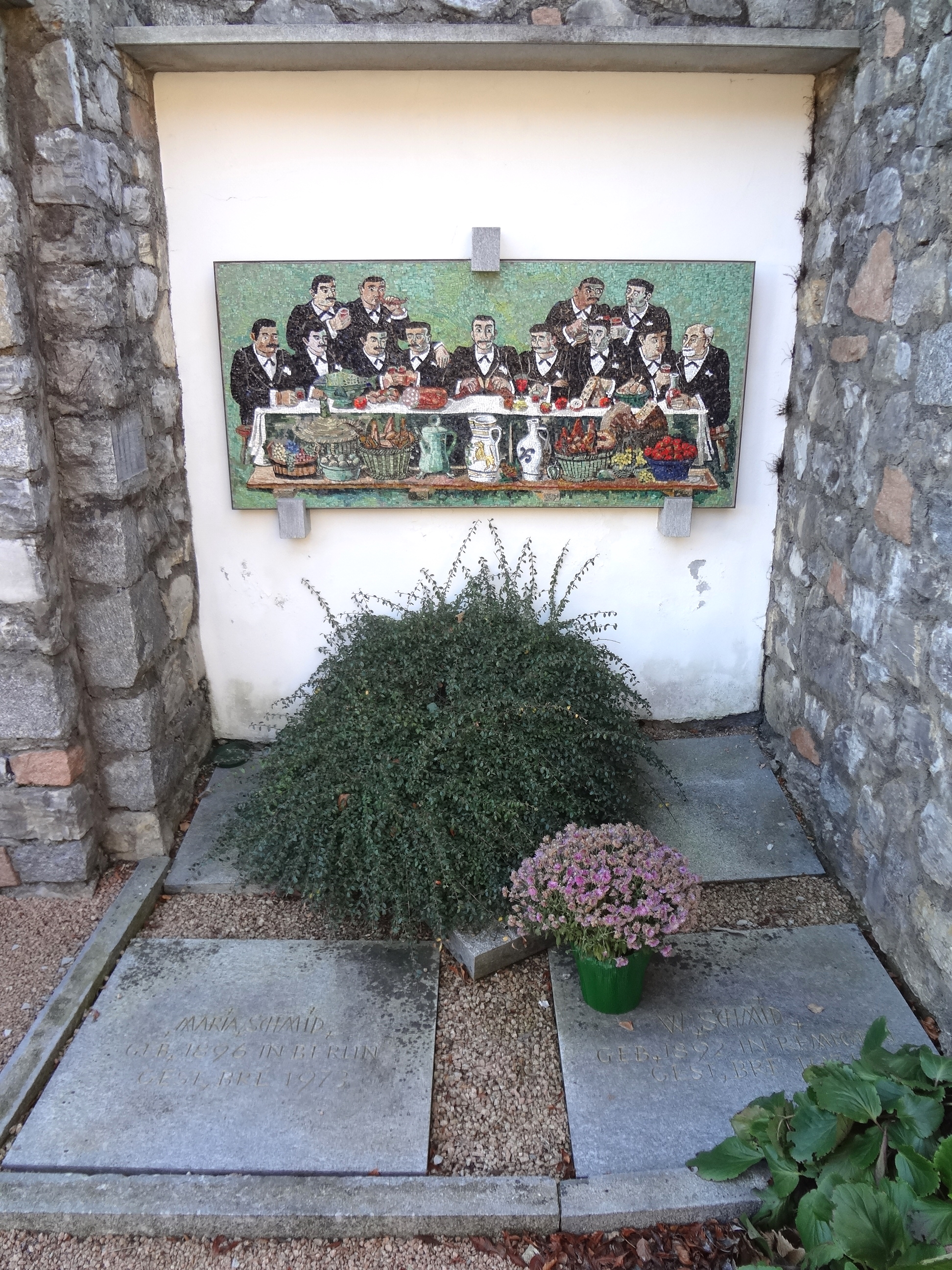
The tomb of Maria and Wilhelm Schmid in Brè

After returning to Berlin and Potsdam, Schmid came under increasing pressure as a so-called “Kulturbolschewist”. In 1937, his art was declared degenerate. In 1938, he left Germany with his Jewish wife and settled in Brè sopra Lugano. He died there on 20 November 1971.

== Work ==
Schmid was largely self-taught as a painter, apart from a course in figure drawing. His learned mainly by studying art. He soon became known and also worked as a mural painter.

His early figure paintings often used theatrical scenes. In Luna, the static composition, sharply separated colours and bright palette showed features associated with Neue Sachlichkeit. Schmid was one of the few Swiss representatives of that movement.

His work also drew on Magic Realism. Around 1923 and 1924, he moved away from more ambitious subjects and placed greater emphasis on painting technique. During the late 1920s and early 1930s, he painted figure compositions with billiard players, jazz bands and waiters. His later work in Switzerland consisted mainly of Ticino scenes, landscapes and still lifes.

== Selected works ==
Schmid’s 1920 painting Luna, also known as Mona Luna or Frau Luna, is held by the Aargauer Kunsthaus. Together with Gelbe Musikanten and Traum des Pierrots, the work caused a scandal at the Juryfreie Berliner Ausstellung in 1920 and brought him wider attention.

In 1937, Schmid was listed among artists labelled “degenerate”, and his works were removed from museums. Some of his major works, including Luna and Madame Dubarry, were brought to Switzerland.

== Legacy ==
After Schmid's death, Swiss newspapers published substantial obituaries, and institutions including the Berlin museums and the government of Aargau sent condolences. Later exhibitions included a retrospective at the Kunstmuseum Olten in 2007 and a Potsdam Museum exhibition on Schmid and the Novembergruppe marking the group's centenary in 2018.
