= Luigi Castagnola (politician) =

Italian politician

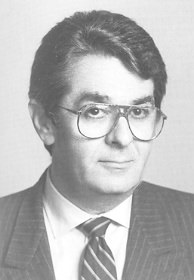
- Castagnola in 1992

Member of the Chamber of Deputies of Italy
- In office 1983–1994

Personal details
- Born: 25 August 1936 (age 89) Sestri Levante, Italy
- Party: Italian Communist Party; Democratic Party of the Left

Luigi Castagnola (born 25 August 1936) is an Italian politician. He served as a member of the Chamber of Deputies of Italy from 1983 to 1994. He is a certified teacher.

== Biography ==
A member of the Italian Communist Party, Castagnola was elected to the regional council in the 1970 regional elections in Liguria and was re-elected in the 1975 regional elections. He was then appointed councilor for finance, the budget, and relations with local authorities in the administration led by Angelo Carossino, serving in that capacity until 1976.

In the 1983 general election, he was elected to the Chamber of Deputies, winning the Genoa constituency with 32,913 votes. He was re-elected in the 1987 general election, when he received 29,111 votes.

After the Bolognina turning point, Castagnola joined the Democratic Party of the Left in 1991 and was re-elected on its ticket in the 1992 general election with 7,643 votes.

His term in Parliament ended in 1994.
