= Monte Brè =

Mountain in Switzerland

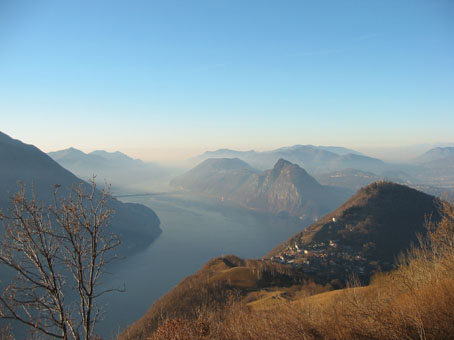
- View of Monte Brè with Lake Lugano and the village of Brè (right).

Highest point
- Elevation: 925 m (3,035 ft)
- Prominence: 135 m (443 ft)
- Coordinates: 46°0′30.81″N 8°59′11.3″E

Geography
- Location within Switzerland
- Location: Ticino, Switzerland
- Parent range: Lugano Prealps

Climbing
- Easiest route: Hike or ride Monte Brè funicular

Monte Brè (925 m) is a small mountain east of Lugano on the flank of Monte Boglia (1,516 m) with a view of the bay of Lugano and the Pennine Alps and the Bernese Alps. It is considered one of the sunniest points in Switzerland.

Since 1912, the Monte Brè funicular has led from Lugano Cassarate to Monte Brè.

== Brè Village ==
Aerial recording of Monte Brè

The village of Brè (800 m; population 300) lies on the eastern slope of Monte Brè and is connected to Lugano by bus service.

The village shows the typical Ticinese architectural style. The traditional communal washing fountain or "Lavatoio" is still preserved. In the center of the old village is the "Path of Art" with notable artists.

The Wilhelm Schmid Museum was the residence of the artist (1892–1971) and today contains a collection of his works. Schmid was the only Swiss painter of the northern Magical Realism style.

== See also ==
- List of mountains of Switzerland accessible by public transport
