= Accademia Ligustica di Belle Arti =

Fine arts school in Genoa, Italy

Coordinates: 44.4077°N 8.9345°E

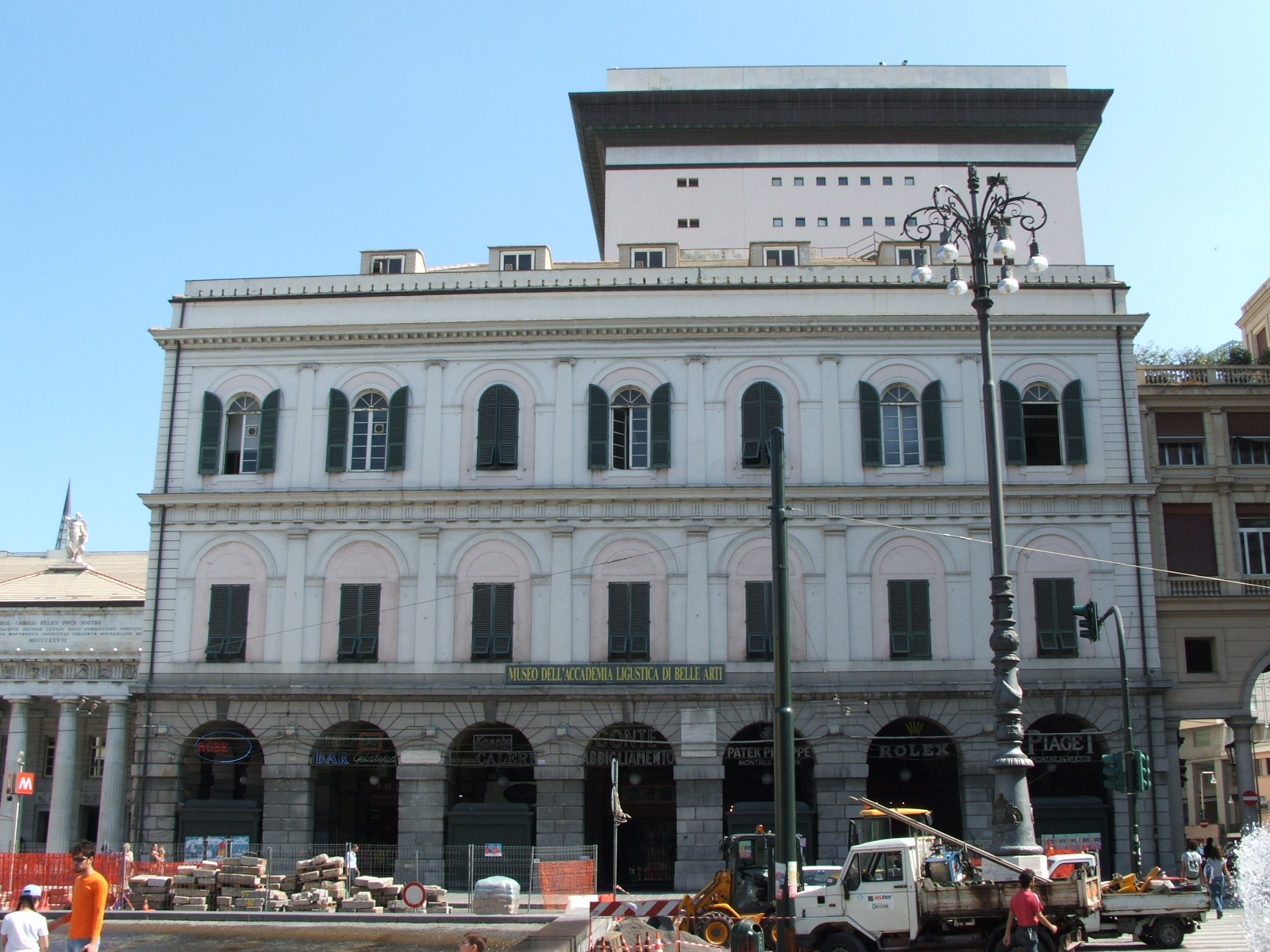
- Genoa, Italy

Information
- Established: 1751; 275 years ago

The Accademia Ligustica di Belle Arti is a tertiary academy of fine arts located in Genoa, Italy. It also houses a museum (Museo dell'Accademia Ligustica di Belle Arti), which includes works of Giovanni Benedetto Castiglione, Giuseppe Abbati, Anton Raphael Mengs, Perin del Vaga, Luca Cambiaso, Bernardo Strozzi, Giovanni Battista Paggi, Sinibaldo Scorza, Domenico Fiasella, Luciano Borzone, Serafino De Tivoli, and Plinio Nomellini. The academy was founded in 1751.
