= Cassarate =

Coordinates: 46.006292°N 8.966432°E

- Village
- Interactive map of Cassarate
- Country: Switzerland
- Canton: Ticino
- District: Lugano
- City: Lugano
- Quarter: Castagnola-Cassarate

Cassarate is a village on the northern shore of Lake Lugano, to the east of the outfall of the Cassarate River, in the Swiss canton of Ticino. Politically the village forms part of the Castagnola-Cassarate quarter of the city of Lugano, although until 1972 Castagnola-Cassarate was an independent municipality under the name Castagnola.
