= Villa Cesarina =

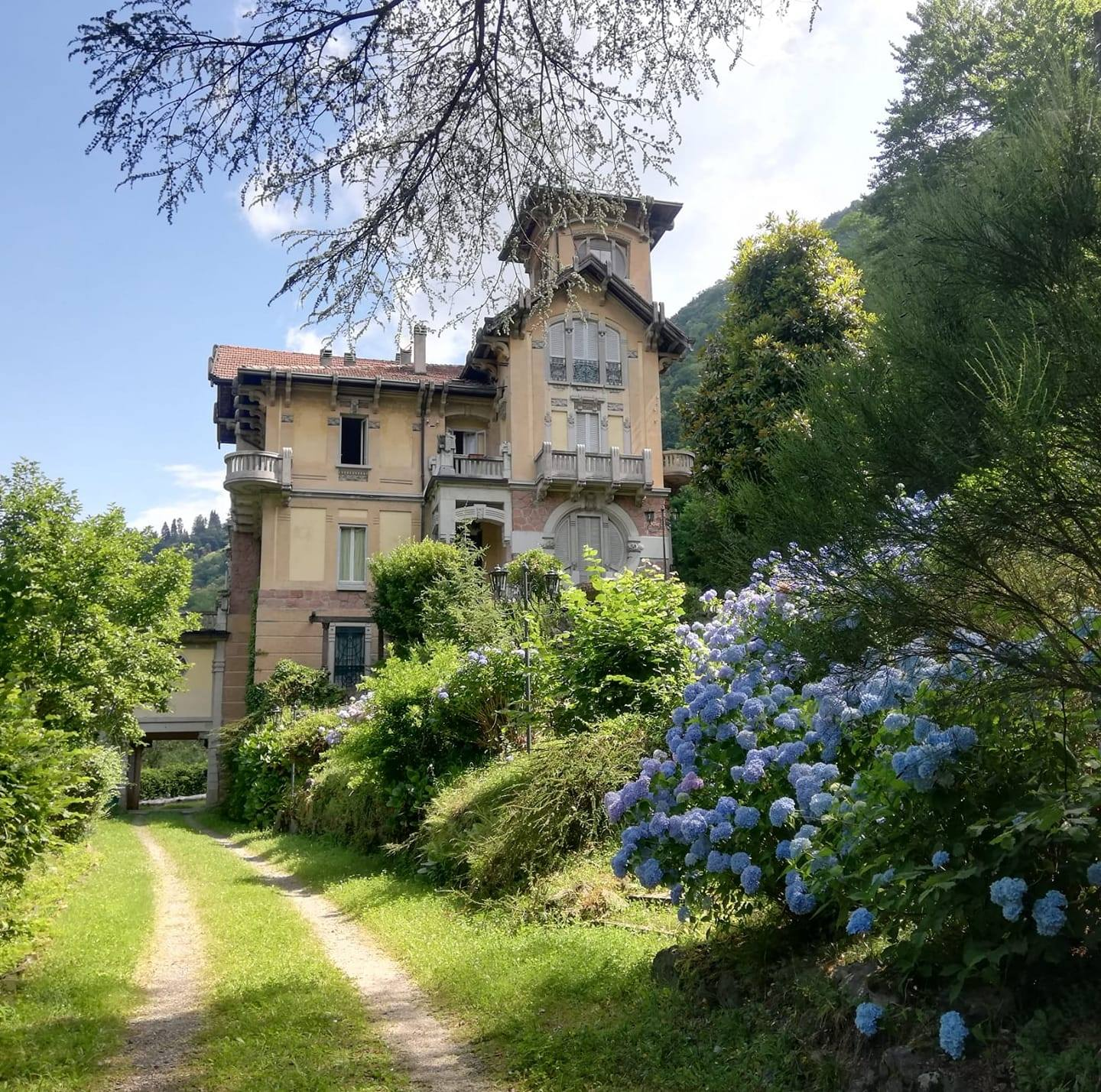
- Villa Cesarina in 2020
- Click on the map for a fullscreen view

General information
- Location: Valganna, Italy
- Coordinates: 45°54′17.4″N 8°49′41.3″E

Villa Cesarina is a historic Art Nouveau villa located in Valganna, Italy.

== History ==
The villa was built in 1906 to a design by the Milanese engineer Vittorio Verganti, on behalf of by the Calegari family. At the time, Valganna was developing into a popular resort town.

== Description ==
The villa is located on the slopes of Valganna. Its commanding position over the valley offers panoramic views of Lake Ganna. It is surrounded by an extensive parkland.

The three-storey building is topped by a small tower and features an Art Nouveau style. Floral motifs, rustication, corbels, and circular openings adorn its façades.
