= Capo San Martino =

Swiss-Italian locality

Coordinates: 45°58′59″N 8°57′22″E

Capo San Martino is a locality in the municipality of Lugano, Switzerland, situated on the eastern side of Monte San Salvatore, along the cantonal road that connects Lugano with Melide. As the name suggests, Capo San Martino ("Cape of Saint Martin") is a natural cliff overlooking Lake Lugano.

Historically, the locality of Capo San Martino was also known as Forca di San Martino ("Saint Martin's Gallows"), because capital punishments by hanging were executed there. The last hanging took place in 1804.

Until 1861, Capo San Martino was in Italian territory, as it belonged to Campione d'Italia. In 1863, Capo San Martino became a hamlet of Pazzallo, then still an independent municipality in the district of Lugano.

During the 19th century, a lime furnace operated from Capo San Martino, along the lake shore. This furnace was just one among several others in Caslano, Melide, Castagnola, Pazzallo, Cimadera, Campione and Melano, which exploited the abundant deposits of limestone of the Sottoceneri region for the production of lime.

== Gallery ==
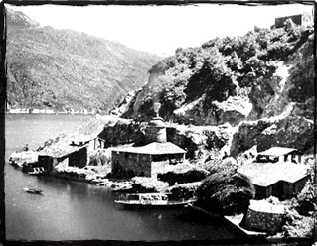
View of the lime furnace at Capo San Martino, date unknown

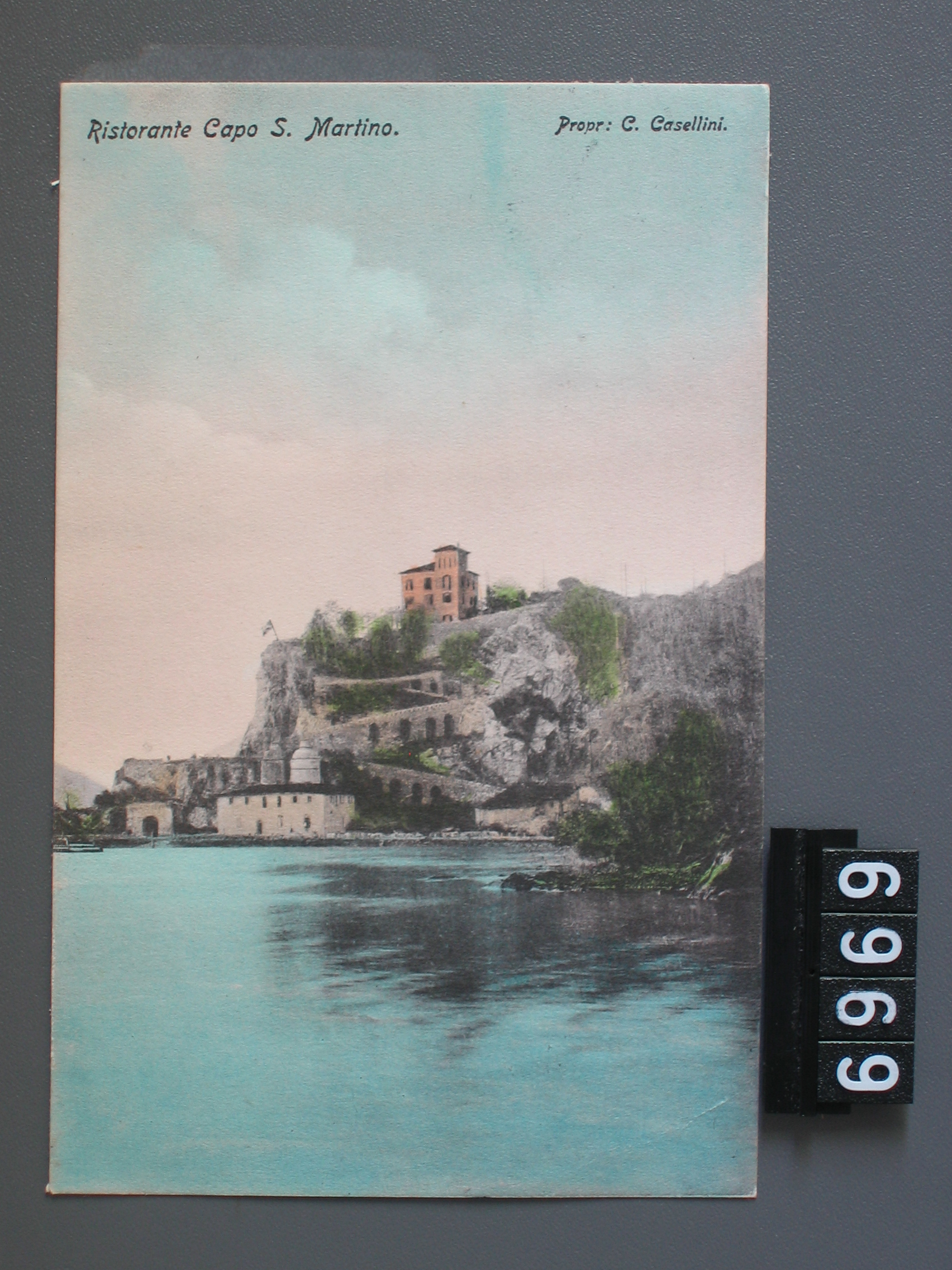
View of Capo San Martino from Lake Lugano, before 1918

Aerial view of Capo San Martino, 1950

Aerial view of Capo San Martino, 1950

Aerial view of Capo San Martino, 1950

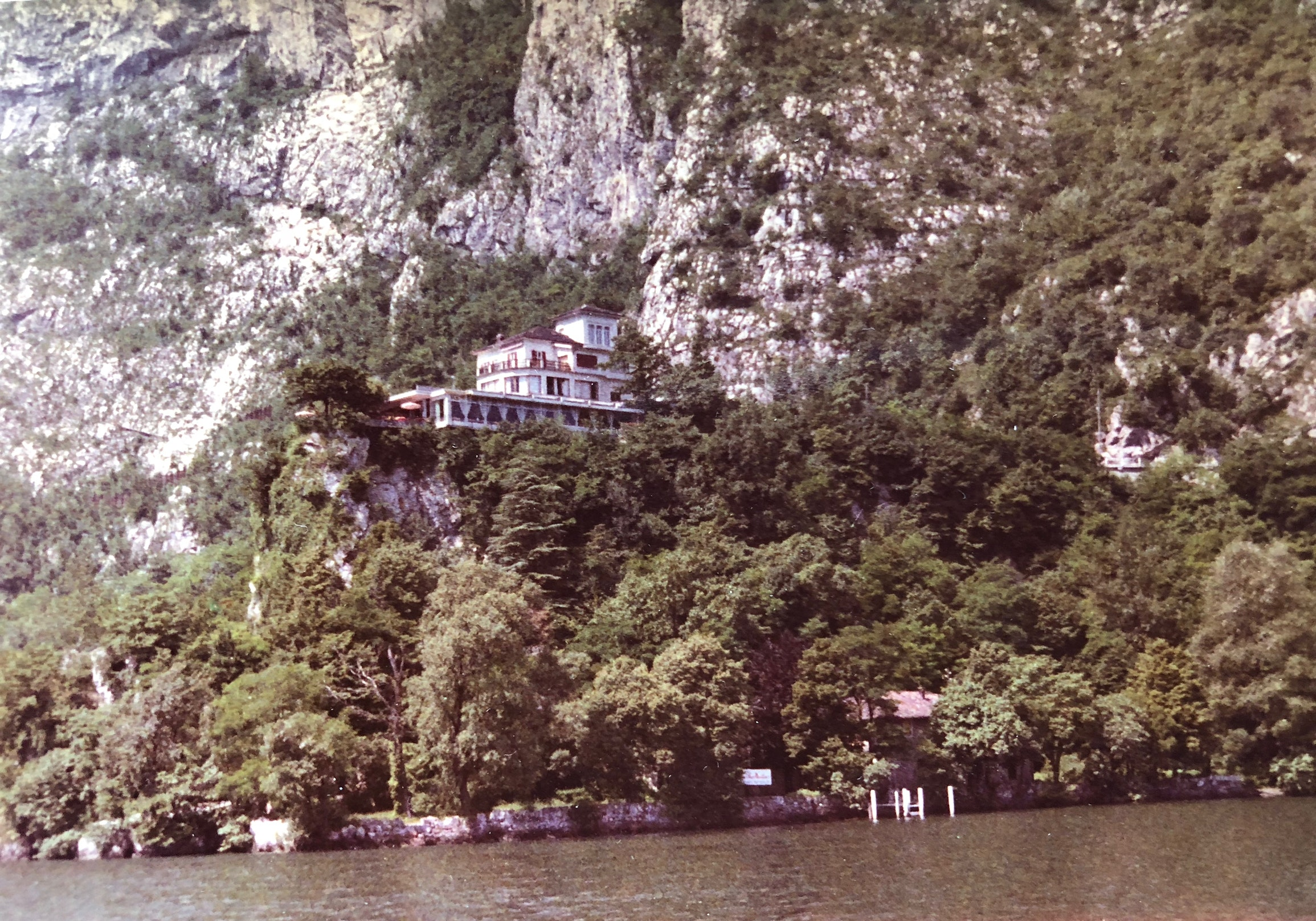
View of Capo San Martino from Lake Lugano, ca. 1969

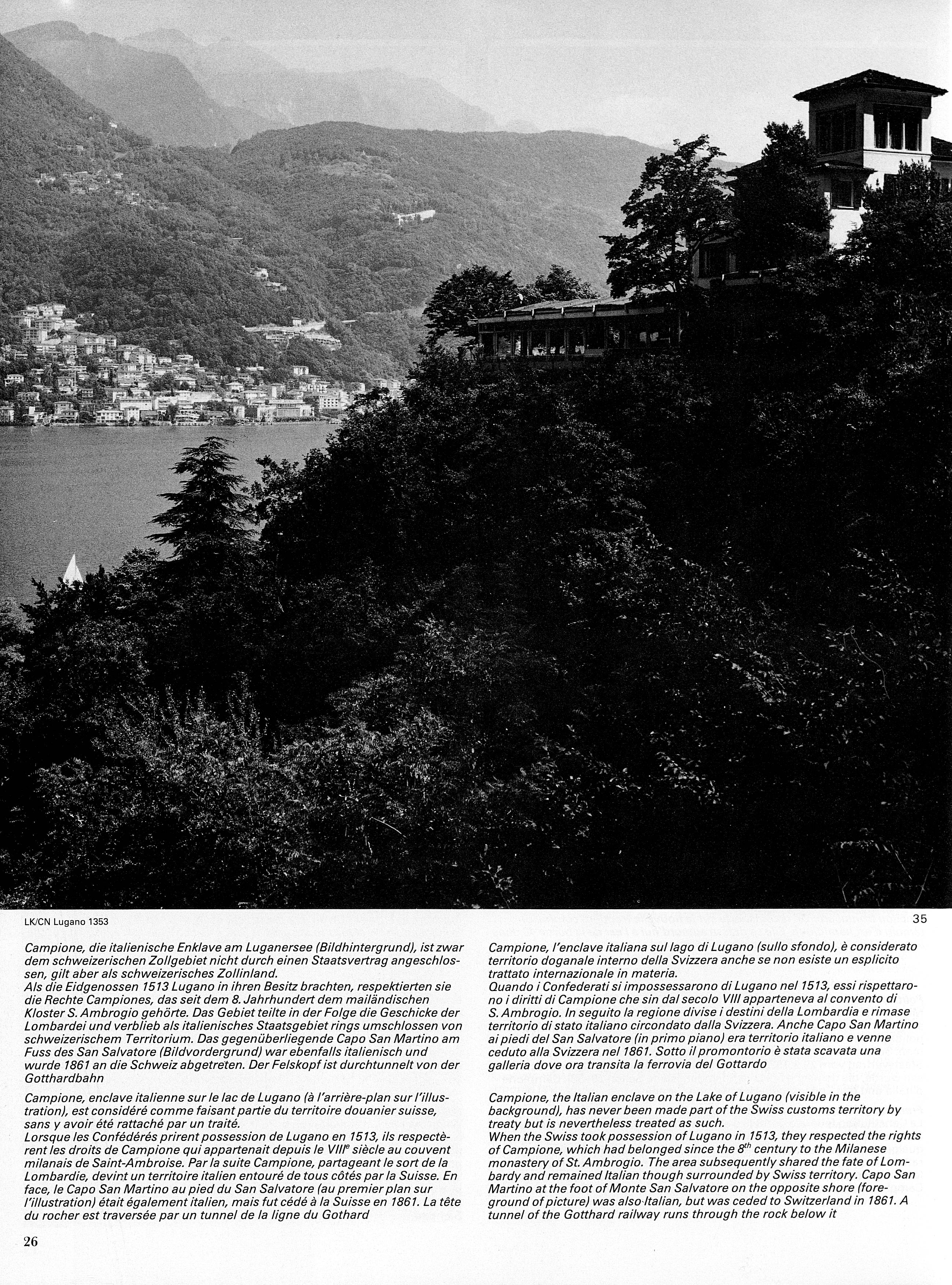
View of Capo San Martino with Campione d'Italia on the background, 1982
