= Melide =

Melide may refer to:

- Melide, Switzerland, a municipality in the canton of Ticino in Switzerland
- Melide, Spain, a municipality in the province of A Coruña, in the autonomous community of Galicia, Spain
- The Melide causeway, a road and rail crossing of Lake Lugano in Switzerland
