= Maroggia Tunnel =

Railway tunnel in Ticino, Switzerland

- Interactive map of Maroggia Tunnel

Overview
- Line: Gotthard
- Location: Canton Ticino, Switzerland
- Coordinates: 45°56′30″N 8°57′59″E
- Status: Active

Operation
- Owner: Swiss Federal Railways
- Operator: Swiss Federal Railways
- Traffic: Rail
- Character: Passenger and freight

Technical
- Length: 569 metres (1,867 ft)
- No. of tracks: 2
- Track gauge: 1,435 mm (4 ft 8 1/2 in)
- Electrified: Overhead catenary 11 kV AC 16 2/3 Hz

The Maroggia Tunnel is a railway tunnel in the Swiss canton of Ticino. The tunnel is situated on the eastern bank of Lake Lugano, between Bissone and Maroggia. It forms part of the Swiss Federal Railways Gotthard line, which links Lugano and the north of Switzerland with Chiasso and Italy, between the Melide causeway and Maroggia-Melano station. It is 569 metres (1,867 ft) in length, and carries standard gauge (1,435 mm or 4 ft 8 1/2 in) track electrified at 15 kV AC 16 2/3 Hz using overhead contact line.

The Maroggia Tunnel is paralleled by the San Nicolao Tunnel, carrying the A2 motorway through the same lakeside promontory.
