= Cuccio =

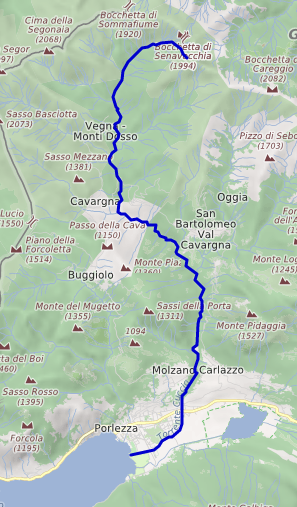

Location
- Country: Italy

Physical characteristics
- Source
  - location: Pizzo di Gino
  - elevation: 2,245 m (7,365 ft)
- Mouth
  - location: Lake Lugano at Porlezza
  - coordinates: 46°01′47″N 9°07′21″E
- Length: 22 km (14 mi)

Basin features
- Progression: Lake Lugano→ Tresa→ Lake Maggiore→ Ticino→ Po→ Adriatic Sea

The Cuccio is a 22-kilometre (14 mi) torrent of the Province of Como in north Italy.

It rises at Pizzo di Gino (commune of San Nazzaro Val Cavargna) and runs south through the Val Cavargna before entering Lake Lugano at Porlezza.
