= Margorabbia =

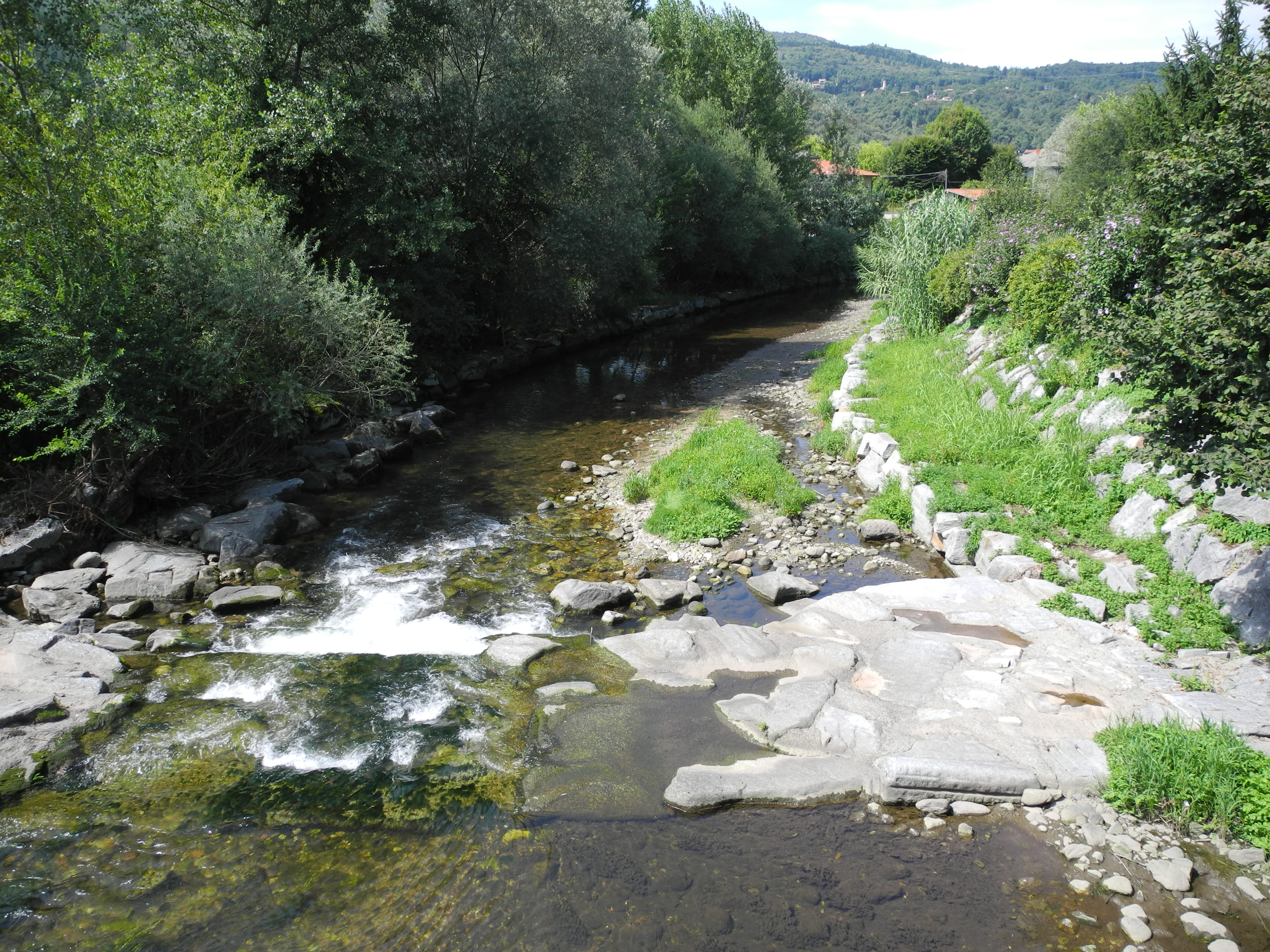
- The Margorabbia in Mesenzana

Location
- Country: Italy

Physical characteristics
- Source
  - location: Valganna
- Mouth
  - location: The river Tresa, just before it enters Lake Maggiore at Luino
  - coordinates: 45.9929°N 8.73231°E
  - elevation: about 193 m (633 ft)

Basin features
- Progression: Tresa→ Lake Maggiore→ Ticino→ Po→ Adriatic Sea

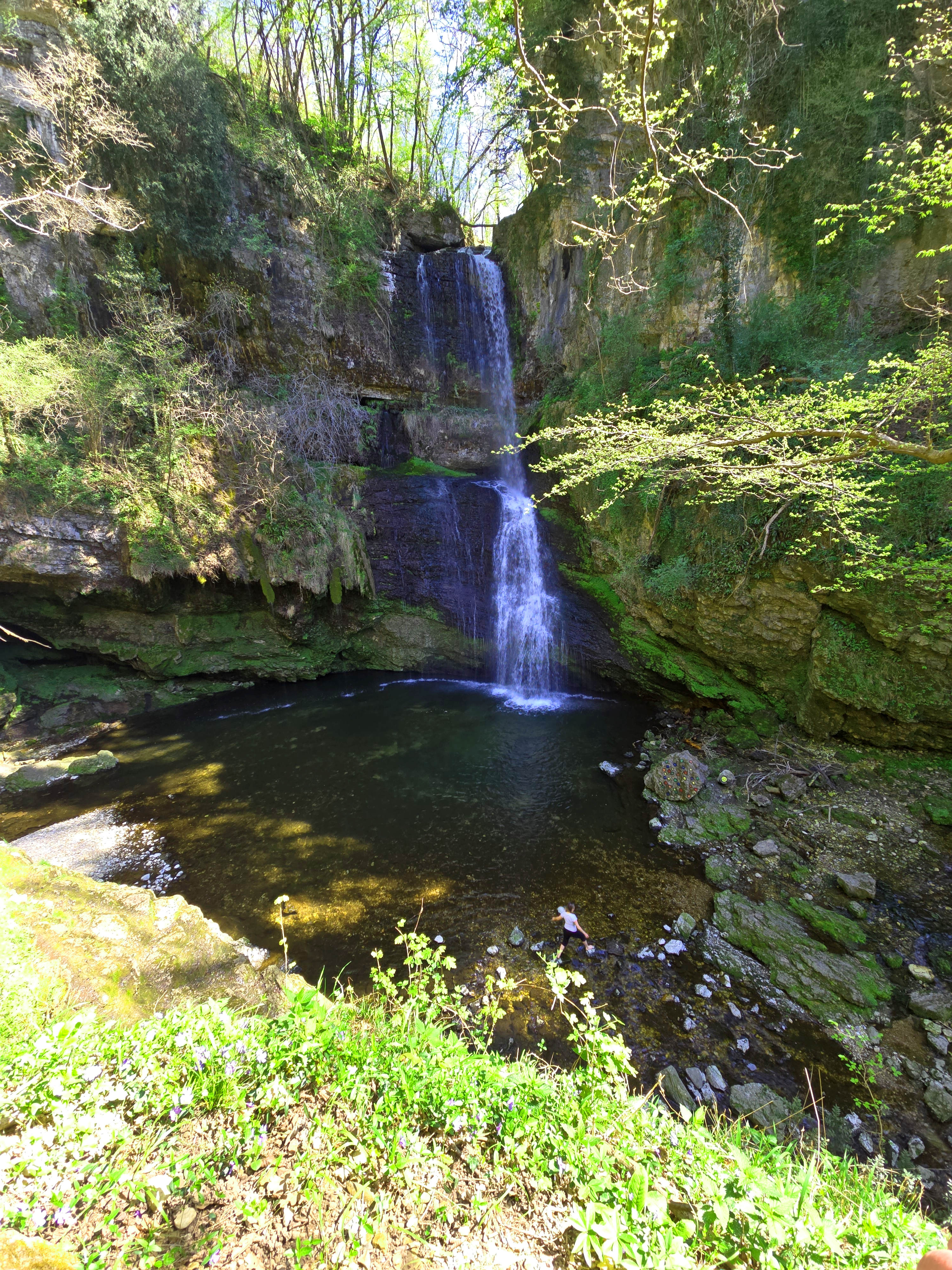
Fermona waterfall, by Margorabbia torrent, in Ferrera di Varese

The Margorabbia is the river (intermittent stream) of Valtravaglia, a valley in the province of Varese, Lombardy, Italy. It is a tributary of the Tresa which it joins a few hundred metres upstream of Lake Maggiore.

The source is near Valganna. After forming a number of small lakes, including Lago di Ganna and Lago di Ghirla, its course continues through the Prealps of Varese until near Cunardo it is swallowed up by a system of caves: Pont Niv, Antro dei Morti, Grotte di Villa Radaelli and Grotte del Traforo.

It emerges from underground near Ferrera di Varese and runs through the Valtravaglia crossing the valley’s communes of Grantola, Mesenzana and Germignaga. A cycle path has recently been constructed along this part of the river.

The torrent has many affluents. The most important left side tributaries are the Rancina, the Boesio and the Gesone; From the right it receives the waters of the Boggione, the Lisascora and the Grantorella.

Thanks to the wet and karstic areas it traverses, the Margorabbia has a generally high discharge and dries up far less frequently than many torrents. These features made it a useful source of power for the mills and factories which grew up along its banks. The power hammers of Ghirla in the commune of Valganna are particularly well known.

The river is subject to sudden and dramatic increases in its flow, becoming truly ‘torrential’. Very often bridges have been destroyed, or it has broken its banks and caused severe flooding in the Valtraviglia. Today many artificial embankments have been constructed along the Margorabbia for the purposes of flood protection.

== The Margorabbia in literature ==
The river was mentioned by the writer Piero Chiara, who was born in Luino on Lake Maggiore, in his story Quando cominciò il mercato di Luino.
