= San Nicolao Tunnel =

Road tunnel in Switzerland

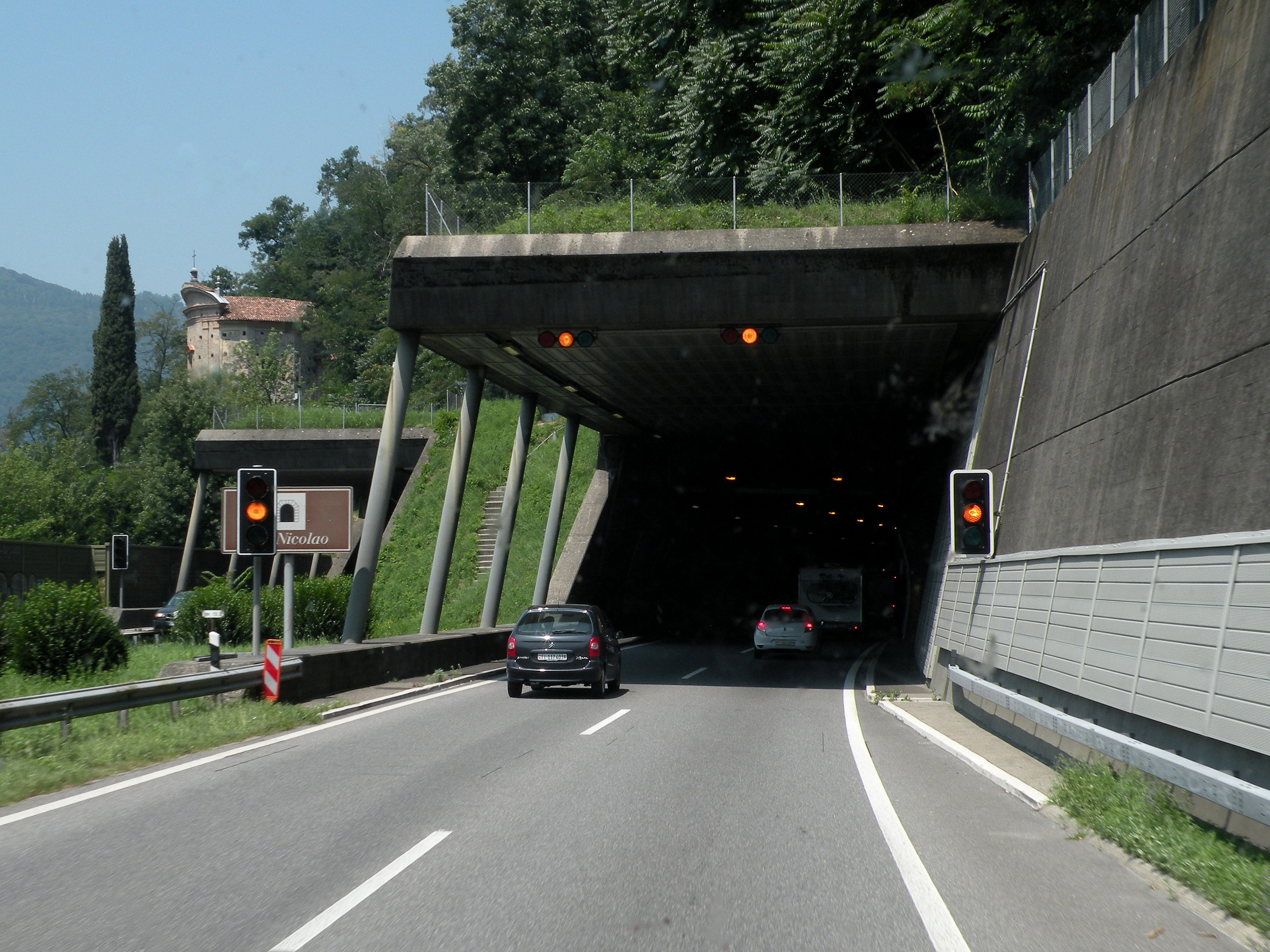
- Interactive map of San Nicolao Tunnel

Overview
- Location: Canton Ticino, Switzerland
- Coordinates: 45°56′30″N 8°57′59″E
- Status: Active
- Route: A2 motorway

Operation
- Opened: 1968
- Character: road

Technical
- Length: around 680 metres (2,230 ft)

The San Nicolao Tunnel is a motorway tunnel in the Swiss canton of Ticino. The tunnel is situated on the eastern bank of Lake Lugano, between Bissone and Maroggia, and forms part of the A2 motorway that links Lugano and the north of Switzerland with Chiasso and Italy. It was completed in 1968, and is around 680 metres (2,230 ft) in length.

The San Nicolao Tunnel is paralleled by the 569 metres (1,867 ft) long Maroggia Tunnel, carrying the Swiss Federal Railways Gotthard line through the same lakeside promontory.
