= Bissone =

- Municipality
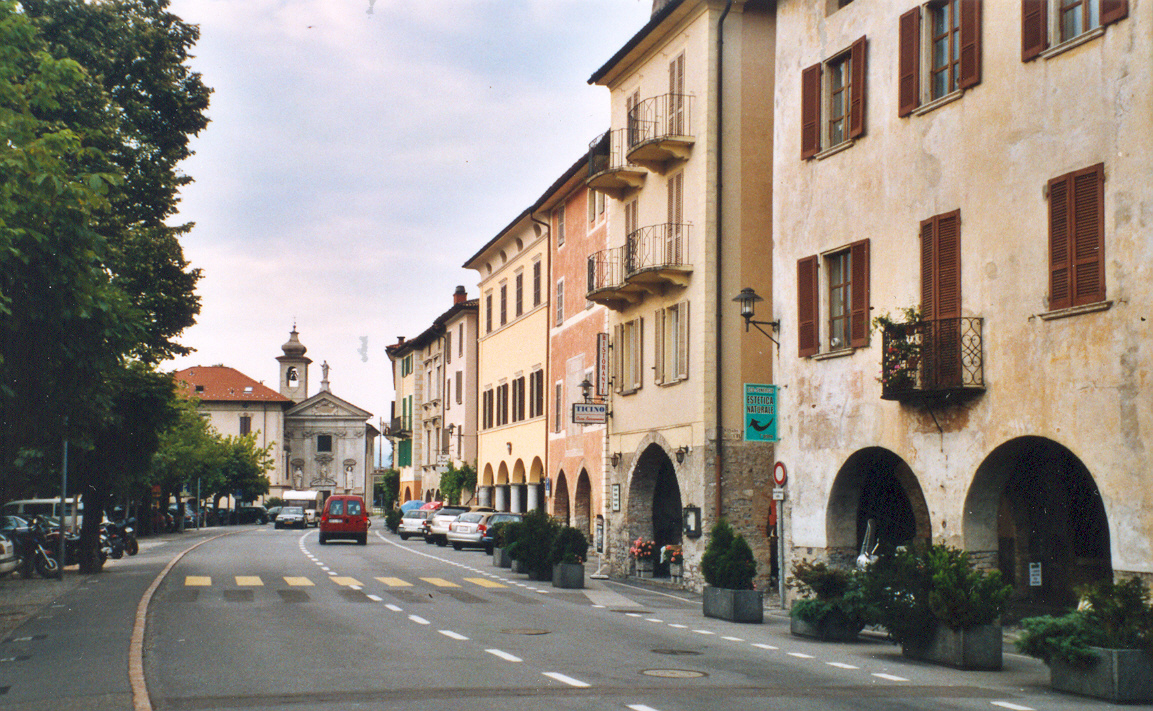
- Bissone village

- Flag Coat of arms
- Location of Bissone
- Location within Switzerland Location within Canton of Ticino
- Coordinates: 45°57′N 8°58′E
- Country: Switzerland
- Canton: Ticino
- District: Lugano

Government
  - Mayor: Andrea Incerti (from 2016)

Area
  - Total: 1.82 km^{2} (0.70 sq mi)
- Elevation: 273 m (896 ft)

Population (December 2004)
  - Total: 781
  - Density: 429/km^{2} (1,110/sq mi)
- Time zone: UTC+01:00 (CET)
  - Summer (DST): UTC+02:00 (CEST)
- Postal code: 6816
- SFOS number: 5154
- ISO 3166 code: CH-TI
- Surrounded by: Arogno, Brusino Arsizio, Campione d'Italia (IT-CO), Maroggia, Melide, Riva San Vitale
- Website: www.bissone.ch

Bissone is a municipality in the district of Lugano, in the canton of Ticino in Switzerland.

== History ==
Bissone is first mentioned in 735 and again in 854 as Blixuni. In German it was known as Byssen, though that name is no longer used.

In the 8th century it was home to a Lombard garrison and supported the fortresses in Campione d'Italia, Arogno and Brusino Arsizio. Starting in the 9th century, the monastery of S. Ambrogio in Milan owned property in Bissone. The parish church of St. Carpoforo, became partly independent in 1474 from the mother church at Riva San Vitale. It became fully independent in 1622, but retained a relationship with the monastery of San Pietro in Ciel d'Oro in Pavia. The Oratory of St. Rocco was built around 1630.

During the Middle Ages, at the site of today's Casa Tencalla, there was a castle. The castle is first mentioned in 1054. On the mountain side surrounded by fortified walls, were the entrance gates to the village. Bissone was the center of the Ghibellines' resistance during the dispute between Milan and Como (1118–27). Following the French invasion in 1798 and the end of the Old Swiss Confederacy, it became a stronghold of supporters of the Cisalpine Republic. However, on 3 March 1798 it was taken over by Pro-Swiss forces from Lugano.

Bissone was the birthplace of the architect Francesco Borromini and home of numerous construction and architecture dynasties such as the Maderno, Gaggini, Tencalla and Garovaglio families. The local economy always relied primarily on fishing and the fish trade. Under the Old Swiss Confederacy, Bissone, Morcote and Melide had a monopoly on selling fish in Lugano. Another source of income was providing ferries across the lake. From the 14th to the 17th century, a number of large houses with arcades were built for the local merchants. Later, emigration together with wine, olive and hemp cultivation became the major sources of income. With the construction of the Melide causeway, carrying the road (1847) and railway (1874) from Melide, Bissone lost its traditional trade income. The highway was built in 1966, and separated the old village from the newer housing developments. Since 1950 the economic structure is dominated by the services sector and commuters to Lugano. Bissone is part of the tourist region on Lake Lugano.

== Geography ==
Dam of Melide 1963

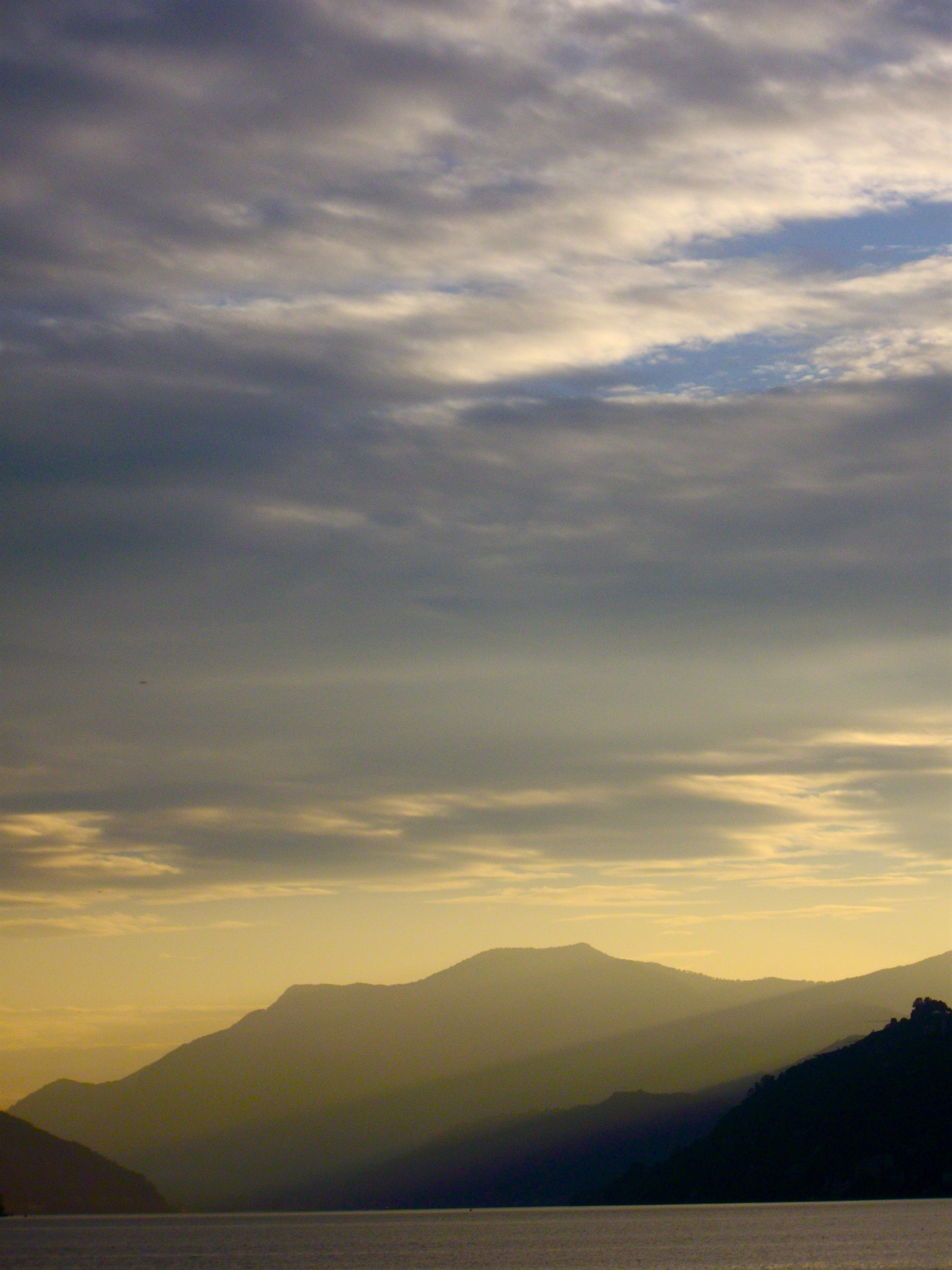
Sunset over Lake Lugano, from Bissone

Bissone has an area, as of 1997, of 1.82 square kilometers (0.70 sq mi). Of this area, 0.22 km^{2} (0.085 sq mi) or 12.1% is used for agricultural purposes, while 1.48 km^{2} (0.57 sq mi) or 81.3% is forested. Of the rest of the land, 0.38 km^{2} (0.15 sq mi) or 20.9% is settled (buildings or roads).

Of the built-up area, housing and buildings made up 12.1% and transportation infrastructure made up 7.7%; while parks, green belts and sports fields made up 1.1%. Out of the forested land, 79.7% of the total land area is heavily forested and 1.6% is covered with orchards or small clusters of trees. Of the agricultural land, 0.1% is used for growing crops and 12.1% is used for alpine pastures.

The municipality is located in the Lugano district on the eastern end of the Melide causeway. It is located on the shore of Lake Lugano, in the southernmost tip of Switzerland.

== Coat of arms ==
The blazon of the municipal coat of arms is Argent two serpents erect regardant azure.

== Demographics ==
Bissone has a population (as of December 2020) of 948. As of 2008, 35.4% of the population are resident foreign nationals. Over the last 10 years (1997–2007) the population has changed at a rate of 4.6%.

Most of the population (as of 2000) speaks Italian (82.1%), with German being second most common (11.3%) and Serbo-Croatian being third (2.0%). Of the Swiss national languages (as of 2000), 80 speak German, 12 people speak French, 584 people speak Italian. The remainder (35 people) speak another language.

As of 2008, the gender distribution of the population was 50.5% male and 49.5% female. The population was made up of 249 Swiss men (30.5% of the population), and 163 (20.0%) non-Swiss men. There were 280 Swiss women (34.3%), and 124 (15.2%) non-Swiss women.

In 2008 there were 4 live births to Swiss citizens and 1 birth to non-Swiss citizens, and in same time span there were 8 deaths of Swiss citizens and 1 non-Swiss citizen death. Ignoring immigration and emigration, the population of Swiss citizens decreased by 4 while the foreign population remained the same. There was 1 Swiss man who immigrated back to Switzerland. At the same time, there were 20 non-Swiss men and 8 non-Swiss women who immigrated from another country to Switzerland. The total Swiss population change in 2008 (from all sources, including moves across municipal borders) was a decrease of 1 and the non-Swiss population change was an increase of 13 people. This represents a population growth rate of 1.5%.

The age distribution, as of 2009, in Bissone is; 66 children or 8.1% of the population are between 0 and 9 years old and 58 teenagers or 7.1% are between 10 and 19. Of the adult population, 68 people or 8.3% of the population are between 20 and 29 years old. 128 people or 15.7% are between 30 and 39, 155 people or 19.0% are between 40 and 49, and 119 people or 14.6% are between 50 and 59. The senior population distribution is 97 people or 11.9% of the population are between 60 and 69 years old, 77 people or 9.4% are between 70 and 79, there are 48 people or 5.9% who are over 80.

As of 2000, there were 348 private households in the municipality, and an average of 2. persons per household. In 2000 there were 153 single family homes (or 59.3% of the total) out of a total of 258 inhabited buildings. There were 45 two family buildings (17.4%) and 40 multi-family buildings (15.5%). There were also 20 buildings in the municipality that were multipurpose buildings (used for both housing and commercial or another purpose).

The vacancy rate for the municipality, in 2008, was 0%. In 2000 there were 558 apartments in the municipality. The most common apartment size was the 3-room apartment of which there were 147. There were 49 single room apartments and 123 apartments with five or more rooms. Of these apartments, a total of 346 apartments (62.0% of the total) were permanently occupied, while 198 apartments (35.5%) were seasonally occupied and 14 apartments (2.5%) were empty. As of 2007, the construction rate of new housing units was 2.5 new units per 1000 residents.

The historical population is given in the following table:

year	population
1591	c. 300
1696	260
1850	302
1900	318
1950	397
2000	711

== Heritage sites of national significance ==
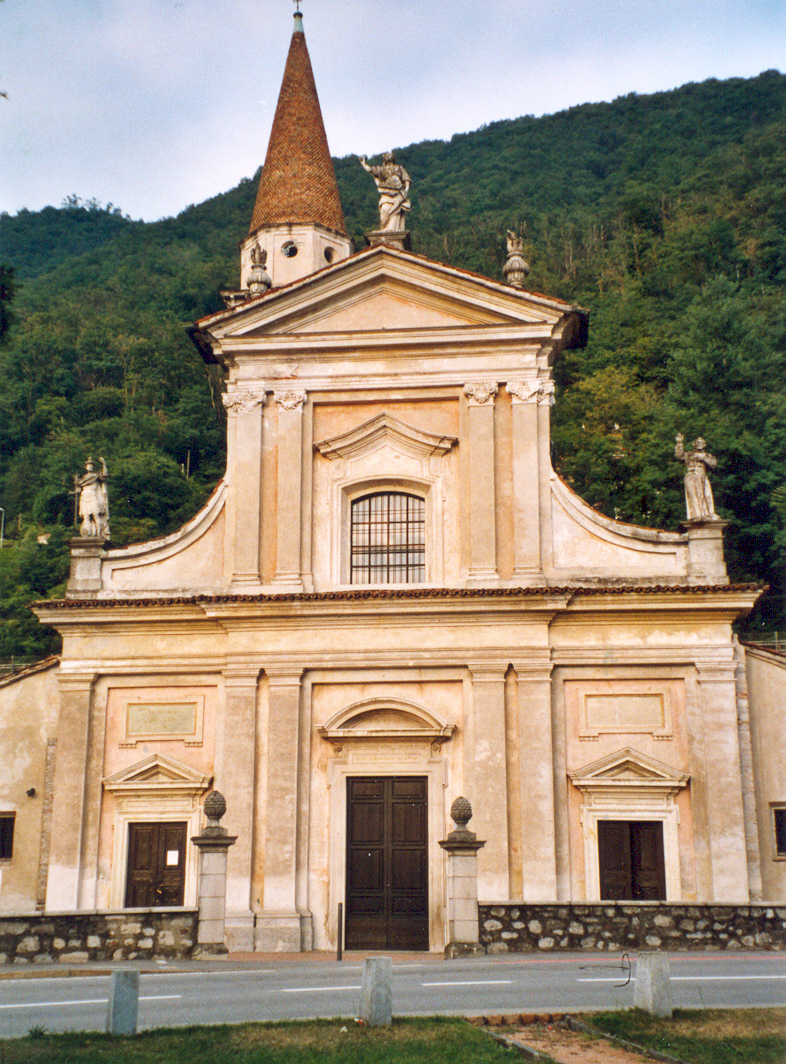
Parish Church of S. Carpoforo

The Parish Church of S. Carpoforo is listed as a Swiss heritage site of national significance. The entire village of Bissone is listed in the Inventory of Swiss Heritage Sites.

== Politics ==
In the 2007 federal election the most popular party was the FDP which received 36.2% of the vote. The next three most popular parties were the CVP (20.33%), the SP (18.23%) and the Ticino League (14.07%). In the federal election, a total of 266 votes were cast, and the voter turnout was 51.9%.

In the 2007 Gran Consiglio election, there were a total of 517 registered voters in Bissone, of which 314 or 60.7% voted. 3 blank ballots were cast, leaving 311 valid ballots in the election. The most popular party was the PLRT which received 83 or 26.7% of the vote. The next three most popular parties were; the SSI (with 56 or 18.0%), the PS (with 54 or 17.4%) and the PPD+GenGiova (with 48 or 15.4%).

In the 2007 Consiglio di Stato election, 2 blank ballots and 1 null ballot were cast, leaving 311 valid ballots in the election. The most popular party was the PLRT which received 82 or 26.4% of the vote. The next three most popular parties were; the PS (with 58 or 18.6%), the LEGA (with 55 or 17.7%) and the SSI (with 53 or 17.0%).

== Economy ==
As of 2007, Bissone had an unemployment rate of 3.89%. As of 2005, there were 3 people employed in the primary economic sector and about 2 businesses involved in this sector. 57 people were employed in the secondary sector and there were 5 businesses in this sector. 198 people were employed in the tertiary sector, with 37 businesses in this sector. There were 347 residents of the municipality who were employed in some capacity, of which females made up 41.2% of the workforce.

In 2000, there were 202 workers who commuted into the municipality and 277 workers who commuted away. The municipality is a net exporter of workers, with about 1.4 workers leaving the municipality for every one entering. About 22.8% of the workforce coming into Bissone are coming from outside Switzerland, while 7.6% of the locals commute out of Switzerland for work. Of the working population, 8.6% used public transportation to get to work, and 69.5% used a private car. As of 2009, there were 3 hotels in Bissone with a total of 146 rooms and 260 beds.

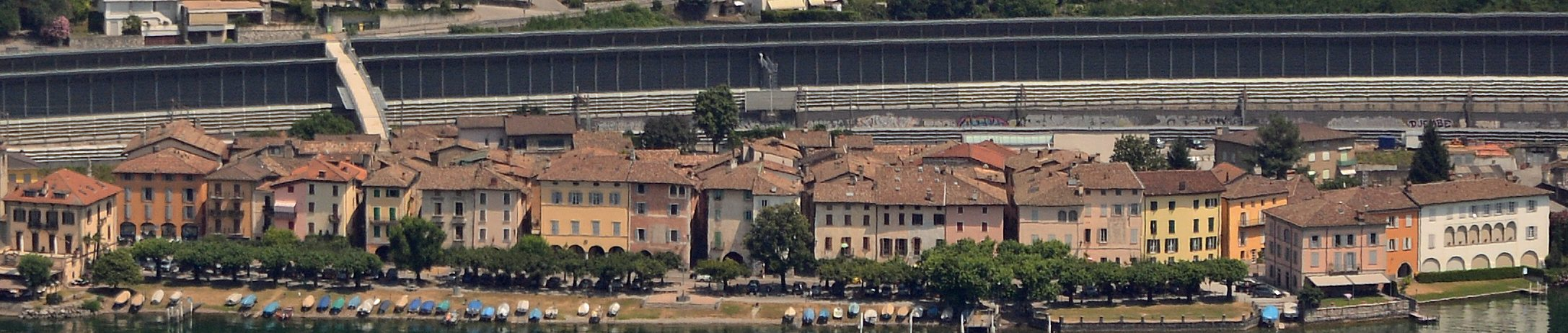
Bissone

== Transport ==
Bissone is located at the eastern end of the Melide causeway, which carries the Gotthard railway, the A2 motorway and a local road across Lake Lugano, providing the only domestic land connection between the southern section of Ticino and the rest of Switzerland. To the north, a local road connects to the Italian enclave of Campione d'Italia, whilst to the south the motorway and railway pass through tunnels (the San Nicolao Tunnel and the Maroggia Tunnel respectively) and the local road passes along the lake side.

There is no railway station in Bissone, but Melide station is located just across the causeway. A motorway junction is partly located in Bissone and partly in Melide.

== Religion ==
From the 2000 census, 546 or 76.8% were Roman Catholic, while 71 or 10.0% belonged to the Swiss Reformed Church. There are 64 individuals (or about 9.00% of the population) who belong to another church (not listed on the census), and 30 individuals (or about 4.22% of the population) did not answer the question.

== Education ==
The entire Swiss population is generally well educated. In Bissone about 76.3% of the population (between age 25 and 64) have completed either non-mandatory upper secondary education or additional higher education (either university or a Fachhochschule).

In Bissone there were a total of 79 students (as of 2009). The Ticino education system provides up to three years of non-mandatory kindergarten and in Bissone there were 14 children in kindergarten. The primary school program lasts for five years and includes both a standard school and a special school. In the municipality, 25 students attended the standard primary schools and 1 student attended the special school. In the lower secondary school system, students either attend a two-year middle school followed by a two-year pre-apprenticeship or they attend a four-year program to prepare for higher education. There were 16 students in the two-year middle school, while 13 students were in the four-year advanced program.

The upper secondary school includes several options, but at the end of the upper secondary program, a student will be prepared to enter a trade or to continue on to a university or college. In Ticino, vocational students may either attend school while working on their internship or apprenticeship (which takes three or four years) or may attend school followed by an internship or apprenticeship (which takes one year as a full-time student or one and a half to two years as a part-time student). There were 4 vocational students who were attending school full-time and 6 who attend part-time.

As of 2000, there were 1 students in Bissone who came from another municipality, while 65 residents attended schools outside the municipality.

== People ==
- Costante Tencalla (1593 in Bissone – 1646 in Warsaw) a Swiss-Italian architect and sculptor
- Francesco Borromini (1599–1667) a leading figure in the emergence of Roman Baroque architecture
- Carpoforo Tencalla (1623–1685) a Swiss-Italian Baroque painter of canvases and frescoes.
- Caterina Valente (1931 in Paris-2024) a French-born Italian multilingual singer, guitarist, dancer, and actress
