= Agnuzzo =

Coordinates: 45°59′38.37″N 8°54′58.25″E

Agnuzzo is a village in the municipality of Muzzano, Canton of Ticino, Switzerland. The village borders Lake Lugano between Agno and Montagnola on the northern end of the lake's western spur. The current population is around 730.

Agnuzzo is host to a portion of the TCS (Touring Club Switzerland) la Piodella campground and a station for the Lugano-Ponte Tresa FLP (Ferrovia Lugano- Ponte Tresa).
