= Lago di Ghirla =

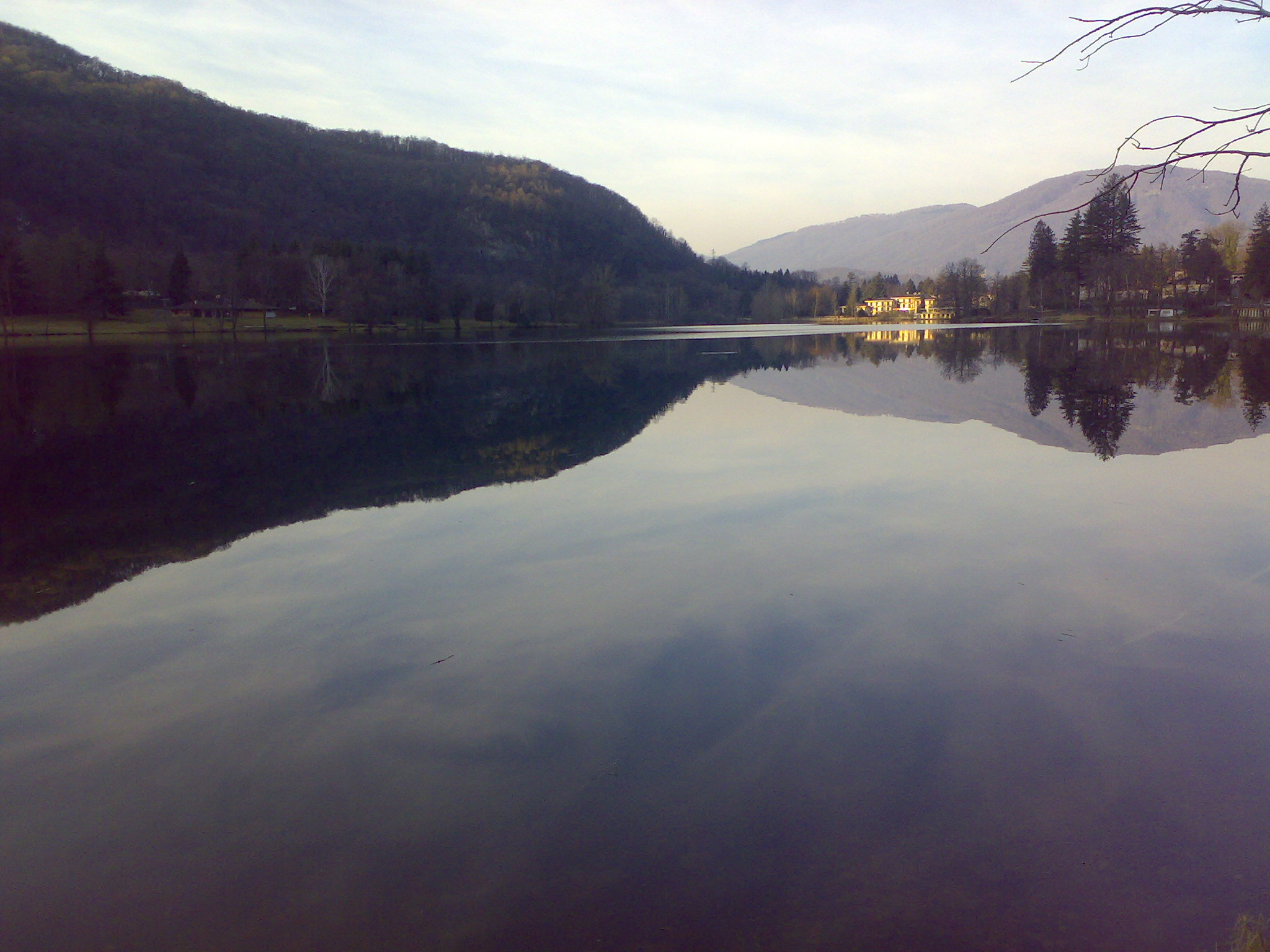

- Location within Lombardy
- Location: Province of Varese, Lombardy
- Coordinates: 45°55′1″N 8°49′18″E
- Type: Glacial lake
- Basin countries: Italy
- Surface area: 28 ha (69 acres)
- Max. depth: 14 m (46 ft)
- Surface elevation: 415 m (1,362 ft)

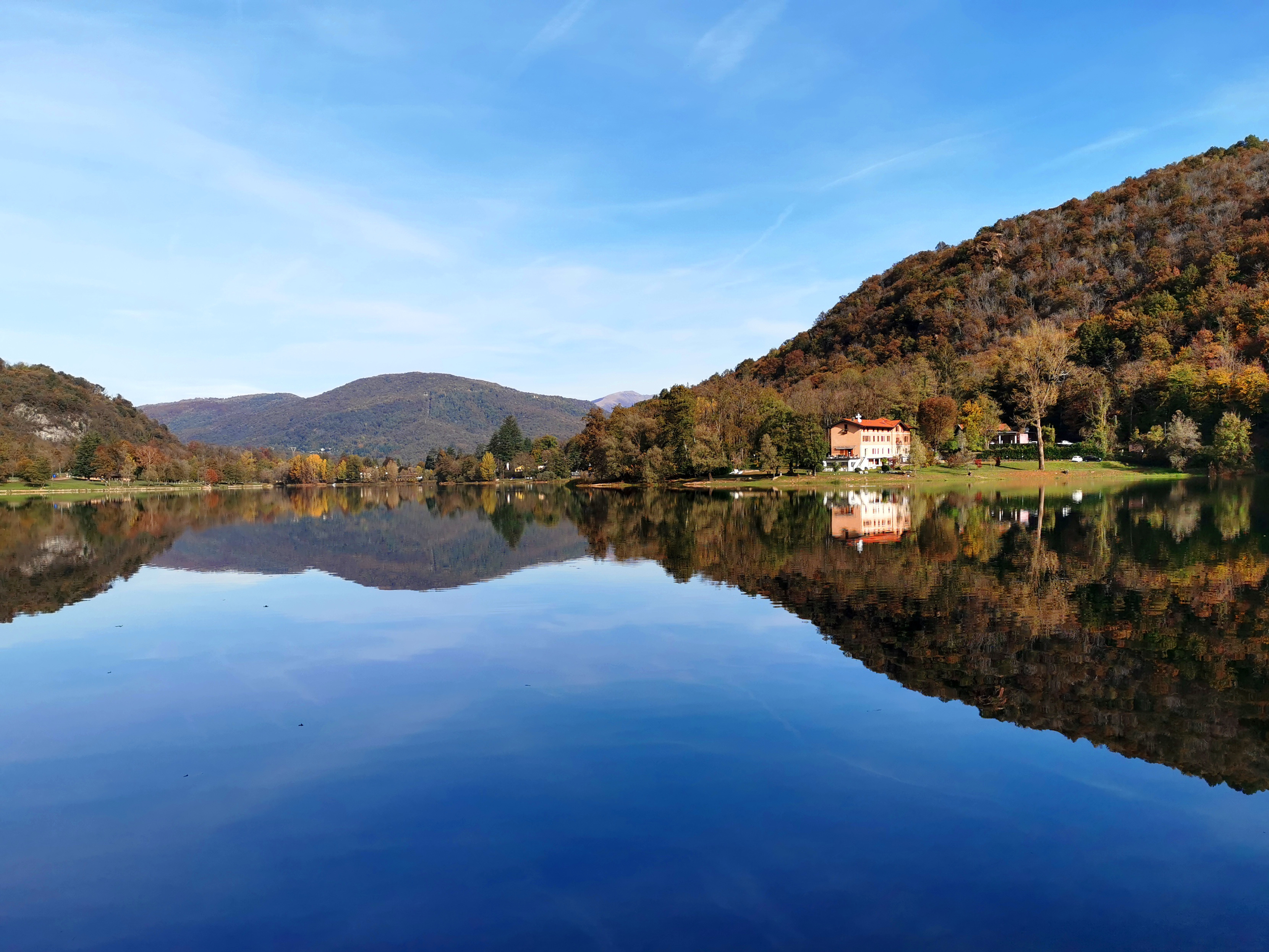
Ghirla Lake

Lago di Ghirla is a lake at Valganna in the Province of Varese, Lombardy, Italy.

== Geography ==
Ghirla Lake is at 442 metres above sea level. Its affluent is river Margorabbia which is a subterranean river coming from Lake Ganna. Its maximal depth is 14 m (46 ft). Its surface covers an area of 0,28 km^{2}.

== Location ==
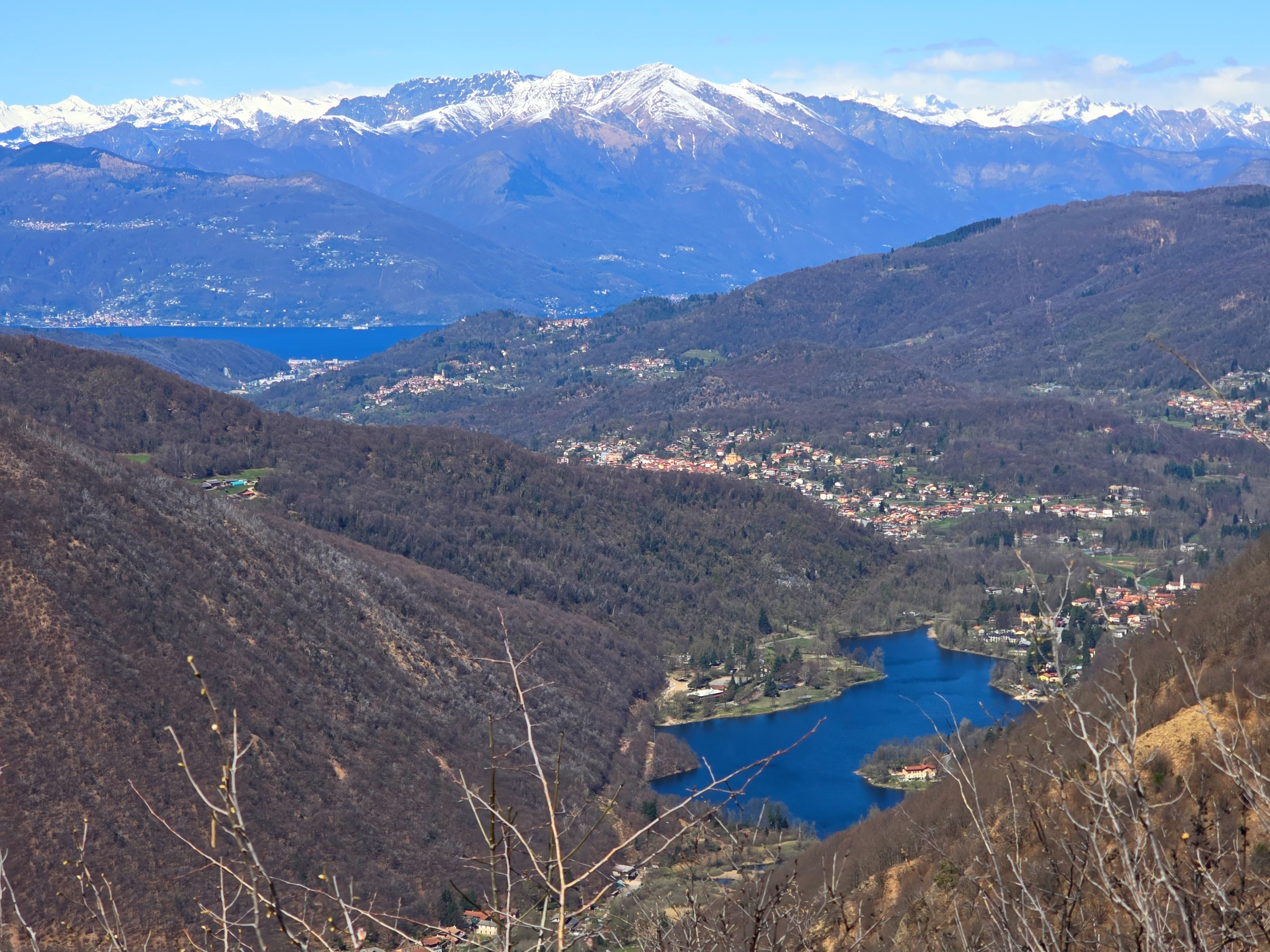
Lake Ghirla from the peak of mount Poncione di Ganna (with Lake Maggiore in background)

The Ghirla Lake is located under comune of Valganna and the highway Strada statale 233 Varesina passes near his Eastern side. The Lake is also comprised in the Cinque Vette Park.

== Climate ==
The climate is continental because the lake is in a prealpine valley : temperatures go far below 0°C in winter and in summer the water temperature is about 20 °C.

== History ==
There are some important dates related to Lago di Ghirla:

- 1898: the level of the lake was raised because of the construction of a dam which enabled the production of electrical energy thanks to a power station.
- 1914: the "Campionato Nazionale di pattinaggio di velocità", a national competition based on ice skating, was disputed for the first time on the surface of this lake.
