= Lago di Ganna =

Lake in Valganna, Lombardy, Italy

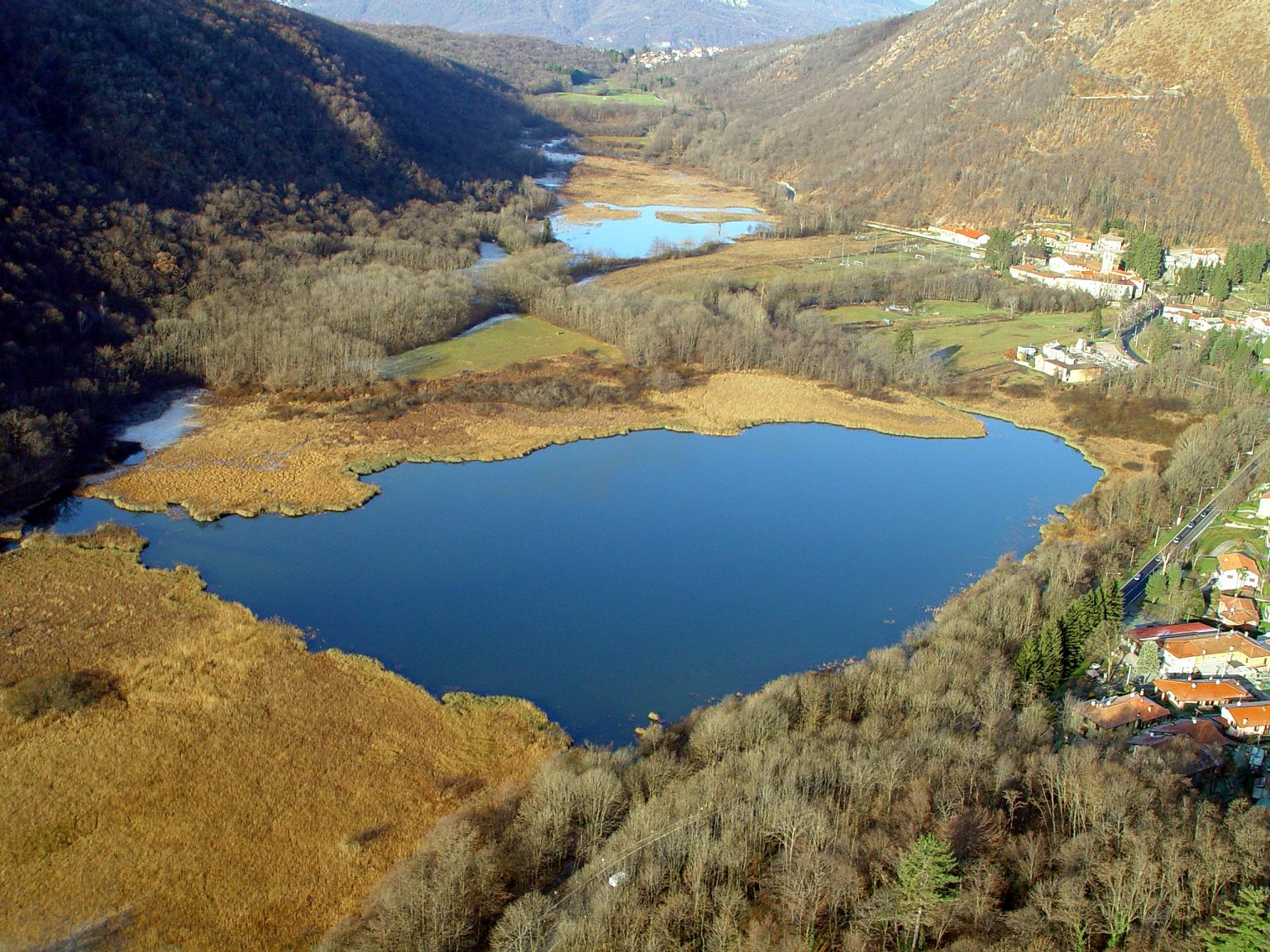
- Lake view

- Location within Lombardy
- Location: Province of Varese, Lombardy
- Coordinates: 45°53′N 8°49′E
- Basin countries: Italy
- Surface area: 7 ha (17 acres)
- Max. depth: 3 m (9.8 ft)
- Surface elevation: 390 m (1,280 ft)
- Settlements: Valganna

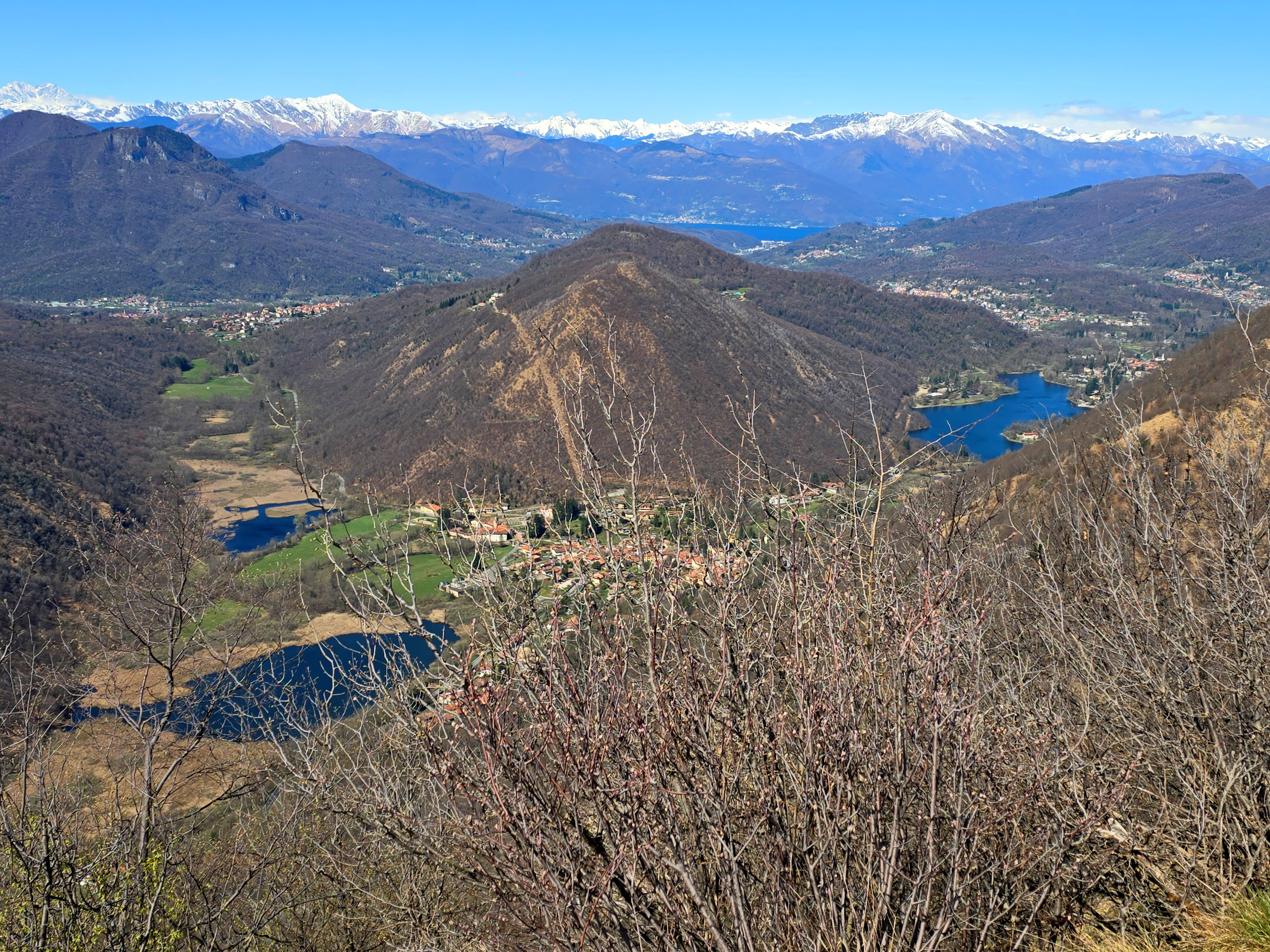
Lake Ganna (on the left) and Lake Ghirla (on the right) from mount Poncione di Ganna

Lago di Ganna is a lake at Valganna in the Province of Varese, Lombardy, Italy.

It has an area of 0,07 km² and a maximum depth of 3 m. It is part of a natural reserve.

== Geography ==
It is located in the comune of Valganna.

The lake has as an underground tributary the river Margorabbia, which than becomes an emissary that flows into the near Lago di Ghirla.

It is entirely part of the frazione of Ganna and it's comprised in the Cinque Vette Park.

== History ==
Between the XII and XIII centuries the benedictine monks changed the hydrography through some reclamation works.

In 1984 the lake became the center of the Natural Reserve of the Lake Ganna.

== Fauna ==
The population in Lake Ganna is mainly represented by pikes and tenches.
