= Melide causeway =

Construction in Switzerland

Coordinates: 45°57′12″N 8°57′27″E

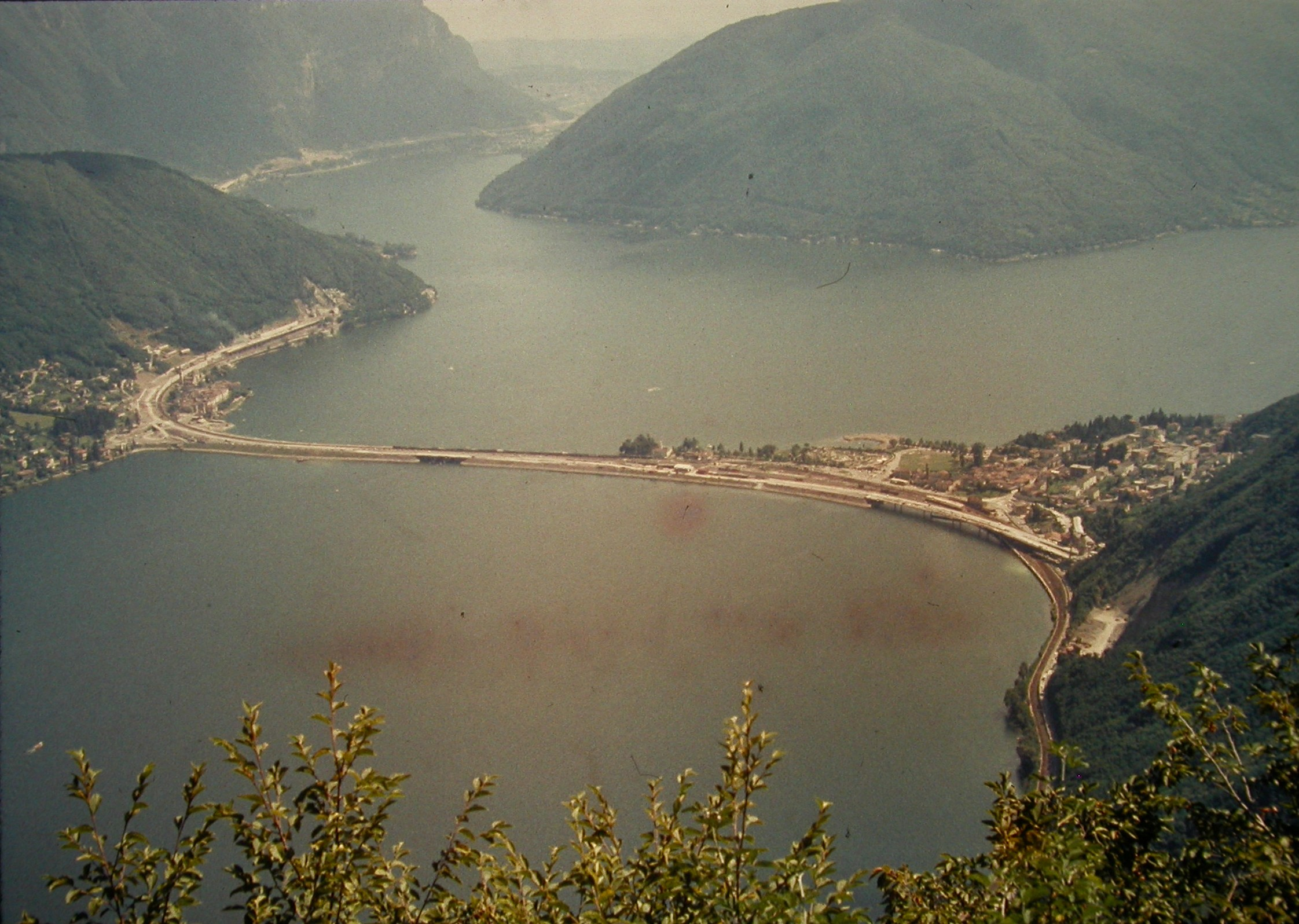
The Melide causeway in 1966, with Bissone to the left (east) and Melide to the right (west)

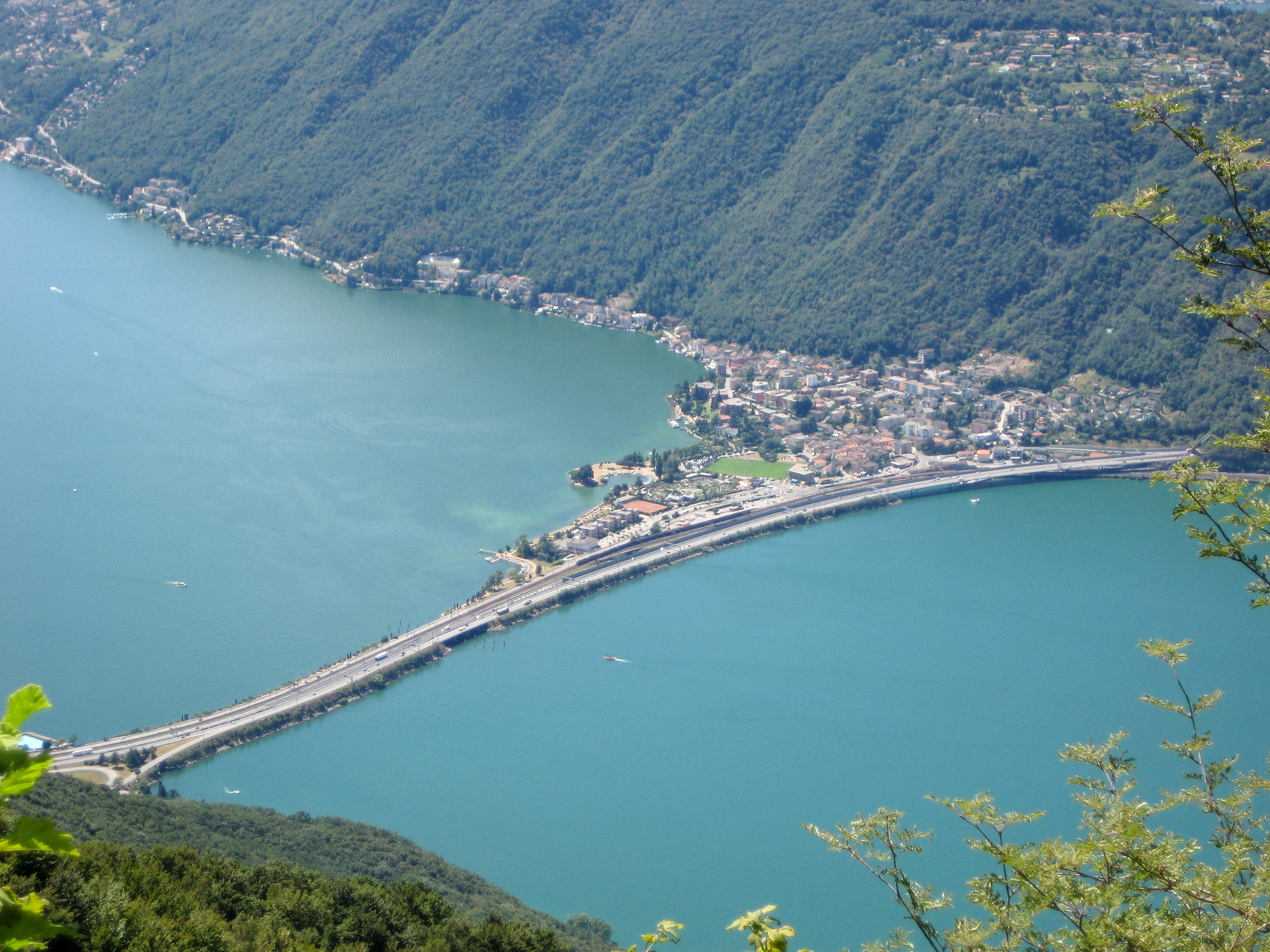
The Melide causeway as seen from the summit of Sighignola, with Melide village to the right

The Melide causeway crosses across Lake Lugano in the Swiss canton of Ticino, connecting the communities of Melide and Bissone, and provides the only domestic land connection between the southern section of Ticino, around Mendrisio and Chiasso, and the rest of Switzerland.

Today the causeway carries the Gotthard railway, the A2 motorway, and a main road. A bridge within the causeway permits water flow and navigation between the two halves of Lake Lugano. The causeway makes use of a submerged glacial moraine, which stretches across the lake reducing its depth to around 10 metres (33 ft), as opposed to the lake's maximum depth of 288 metres (945 ft).

The causeway was designed by Pasquale Lucchini, a self-taught Ticinese civil engineer, who arranged for large quantities of rock to be dumped on top of the moraine to create the causeway. The causeway was built between 1841 and 1847, and opened for road traffic in 1848. The railway was added to the causeway in 1872, and the motorway in 1980.

A comparable causeway in Switzerland is the Seedamm across a narrow section at Lake Zurich.
