= Valganna =

- Comune
- Comune di Valganna
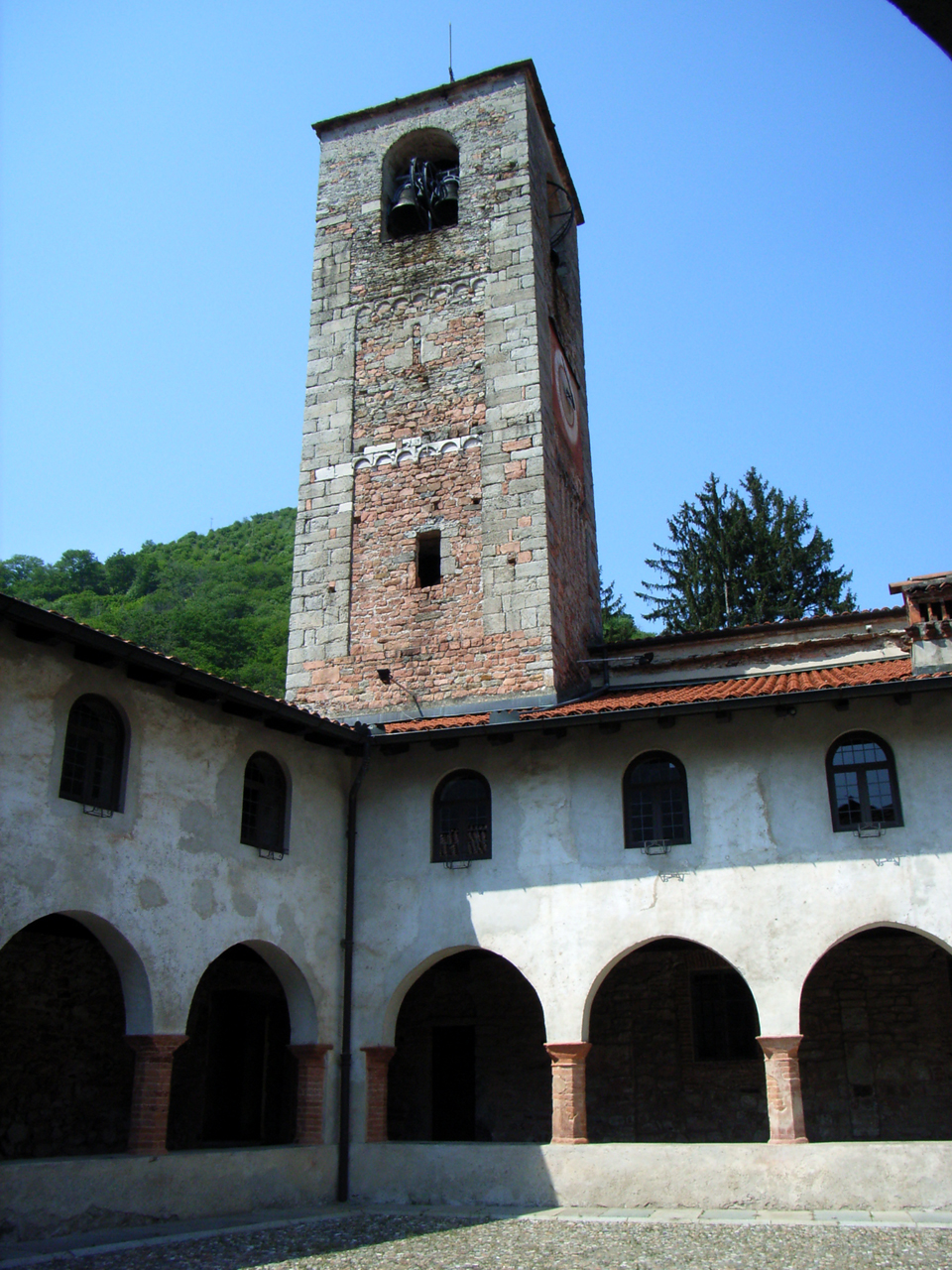

- Location within Italy Location within Lombardy
- Coordinates: 45°56′N 8°50′E
- Country: Italy
- Region: Lombardy
- Province: Varese (VA)
- Frazioni: Boarezzo, Ganna, Ghirla, Mondonico

Government
  - Mayor: Bruna Jardini

Area
  - Total: 12.5 km^{2} (4.8 sq mi)
- Elevation: 380 m (1,250 ft)

Population (28 February 2017)
  - Total: 1,598
  - Density: 128/km^{2} (331/sq mi)
- Demonym: Valgannesi
- Time zone: UTC+1 (CET)
  - Summer (DST): UTC+2 (CEST)
- Postal code: 21039
- Dialing code: 0332
- Patron saint: Saint Christopher
- Saint day: July 25
- Website: Official website

Valganna is a comune (municipality) within the Province of Varese in the Italian region Lombardy, located about 60 km (37 mi) northwest of Milan and about 13 km (8.1 mi) north of Varese. The name Valganna is a compound of valley and Ganna, which is the name of one of the villages located in the valley. Lago di Ghirla and Lago di Ganna are located in the territory of the municipality.

Valganna borders the following municipalities: Arcisate, Bedero Valcuvia, Brinzio, Cuasso al Monte, Cugliate-Fabiasco, Cunardo, Induno Olona; the territory of the Comune is comprised in the Cinque Vette Park.
