= Lake Lugano =

Lake in two countries;Italy and Switzerland

- Lago di Lugano
- Lagh de Lugan (Lombard)
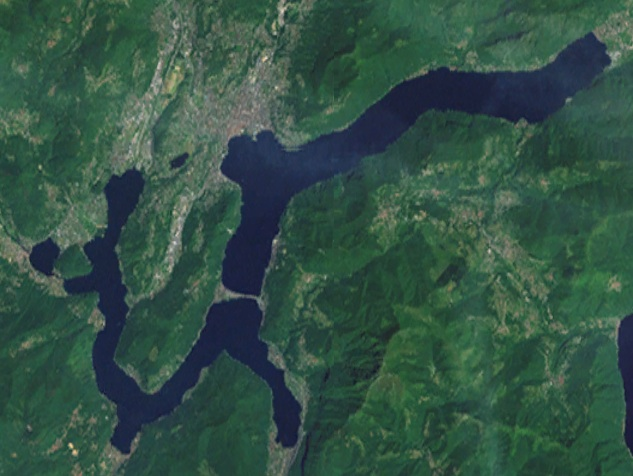
- Satellite image of Lake Lugano

- Location within Canton of Ticino Location within Lombardy Location within Switzerland Location within Italy Location within Alps
- Interactive map of Lake Lugano
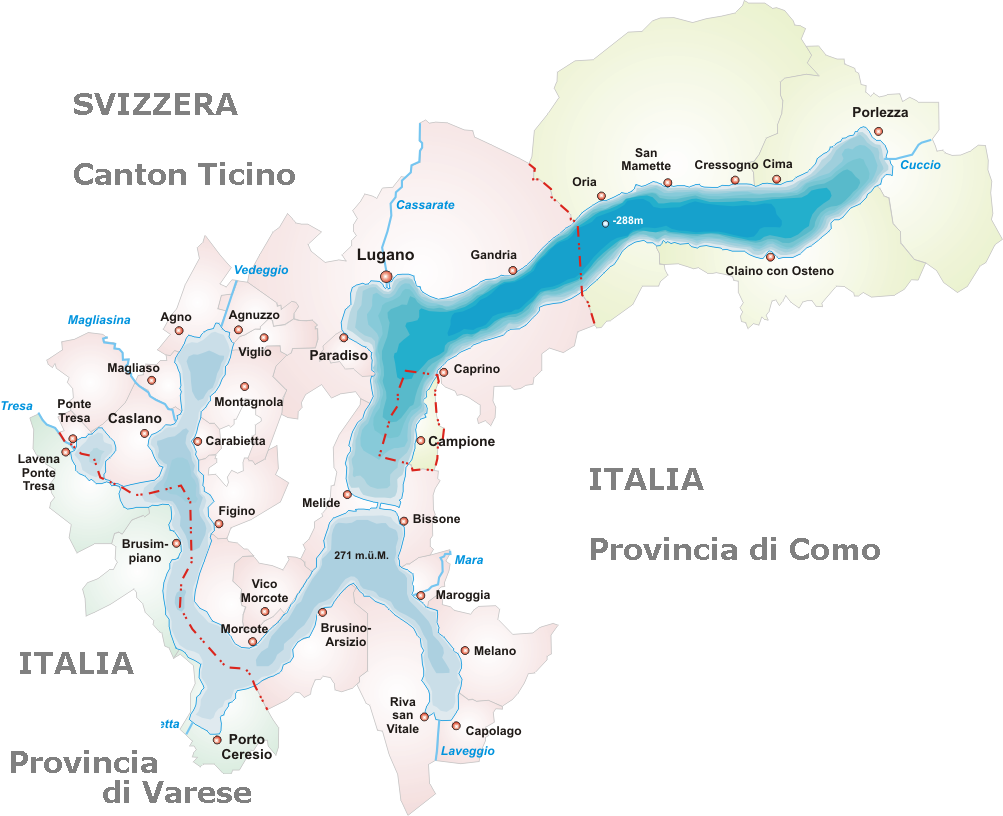
- Map of the lake
- Location: Ticino, Lombardy
- Coordinates: 45°59′N 8°58′E
- Primary inflows: Vedeggio, Cassarate, Cuccio, Mara, Laveggio, Magliasina, Bolletta, Scairolo
- Primary outflows: Tresa
- Catchment area: 565.6 km^{2} (218.4 sq mi)
- Basin countries: Switzerland, Italy
- Surface area: 48.7 km^{2} (18.8 sq mi)
- Average depth: 134 m (440 ft)
- Max. depth: 288 m (945 ft)
- Water volume: 6.5 km^{3} (1.6 cu mi)
- Residence time: 8.2 years
- Surface elevation: 271 m (889 ft)
- Sections/sub-basins: North basin, South basin, Ponte Tresa
- Settlements: Lugano, Melide, Campione d'Italia, Ponte Tresa

Lake Lugano (Italian: Lago di Lugano or Ceresio, from Latin: Ceresius lacus; Lombard: Lagh de Lugan) is a glacial lake which is situated on the border between southern Switzerland and northern Italy. The lake, named after the city of Lugano, is situated between Lake Como and Lago Maggiore. It was cited for the first time by Gregory of Tours in 590 with the name Ceresio, a name which is said to have derived from the Latin word cerasus, meaning cherry, and refers to the abundance of cherry trees which at one time adorned the shores of the lake. The lake appears in documents in 804 under the name Laco Luanasco.

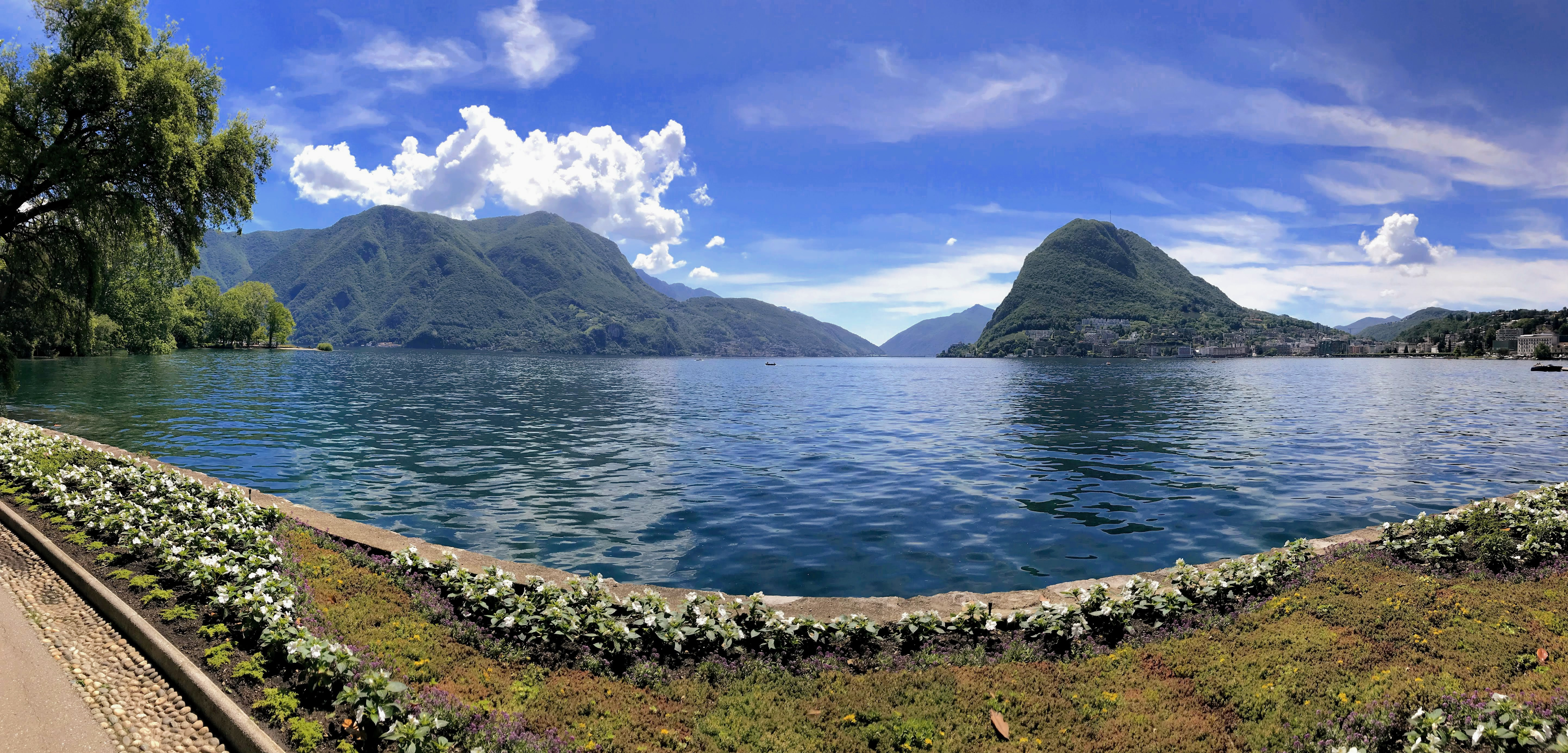
Lake Lugano

There are various mountains and tourist destinations on the shores of the lake including Monte Brè to the east, Monte San Salvatore west of Lugano, and Monte Generoso on the south-eastern shore. The World Heritage Site Monte San Giorgio is situated south of the lake. Also located to the south is the Cinque Vette Park.

The lake is drained by the Tresa, which empties into Lake Maggiore, the latter being drained by the Ticino and the Po.

== History ==
The first certain testimony of a political body governing the shores of the lake is from 818. Occupying an area of strategic importance, the lake was then part of the feudal dominion of the County of Sperio. Circa 1000, it came under the control of the Bishop of Como. The region was the site of the war between Como and Milan over control of Alpine traffic from 1218 to 1227. As the lake and its shores became progressively incorporated into the Duchy of Milan they became the subject of political and territorial contention during the 15th century, and Lugano became the lake's main town.

The lake definitively ceased to belong to a single sovereign political entity following the establishment of the transalpine bailiwicks of the Swiss cantons at the beginning of the 16th century. The Italian-Swiss border was fixed in 1752 by the Treaty of Varese, and has since remained virtually unchanged.

In 1848, the Melide causeway was built on a moraine between Melide and Bissone, in order to carry a road across the lake and provide a direct connection between Lugano and Chiasso. Today the causeway also carries the Gotthard railway and the A2 motorway.

== Geography ==
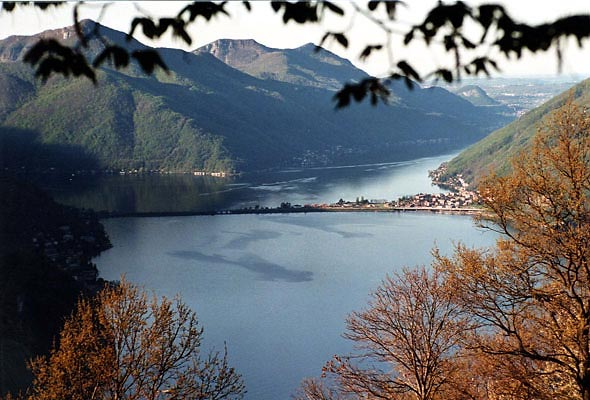
Lake Lugano with the Melide causeway

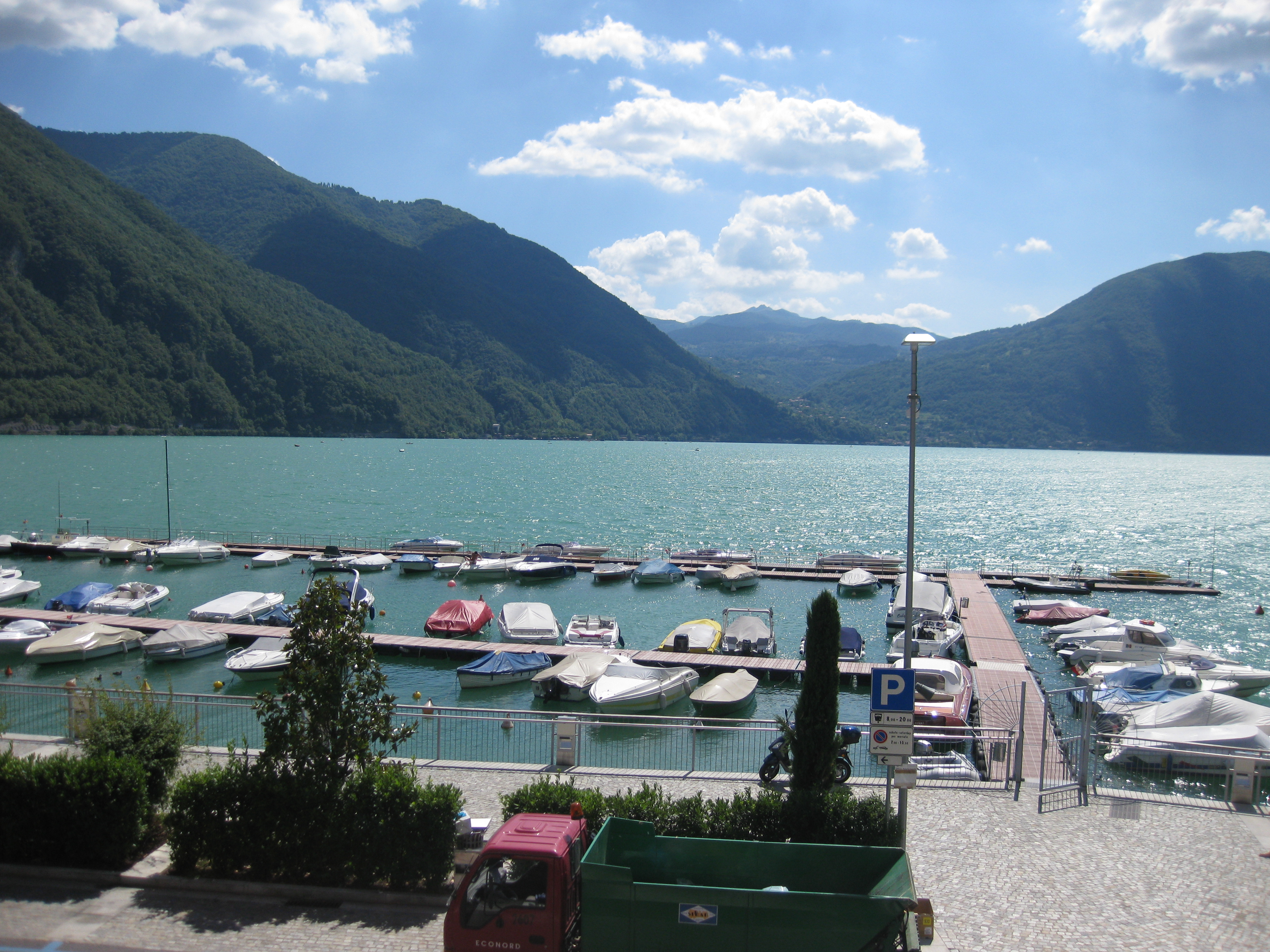
Porlezza, at the head of the lake in Italy

The lake is 48.7 km^{2} (18.8 sq mi) in size, 63% of which is in Switzerland and 37% in Italy. It has an average width of roughly 1 km (0.62 mi) and a maximum width of about 3 km (1.9 mi) at the bay of Lugano. A maximum depth of 288 m (945 ft) is found in the northern basin. The culminating point of the lake's drainage basin is the Pizzo di Gino summit in the Lugano Prealps (2,245 m; 7,365 ft). Bathing in the lake is allowed at any of the 50 or so bathing establishments located along the Swiss shores.

The Italian exclave of Campione d'Italia and parts of the waters of the lake are considered by European Customs Law as non-territorial for fiscal purposes and as such enjoy a special tax status as a duty-free area, exemption from EU VAT and offer residents other advantageous tax privileges.

The Melide causeway separates the northern (27.5 km^{2}; 10.6 sq mi) and southern (21.4 km^{2}; 8.3 sq mi) basins, although a bridge in the causeway permits water flow and navigation. The lake retention time is an average of 8.2 years; that of the northern basin (11.9 years) is considerably higher than the southern one (2.3 years).

Places on the lake in Switzerland (CH) and in Italy (I) include (from Lugano, clockwise):

- Lugano (CH)
- Cassarate (CH)
- Castagnola (CH)
- Gandria (CH)
- Oria, Valsolda (I)
- San Mamete (I)
- Cressogno (I)
- Porlezza (I)
- Cantine di Gandria (CH)
- Caprino (CH)
- Campione d'Italia (I)
- Bissone (CH)
- Maroggia (CH)
- Melano (CH)
- Capolago (CH)
- Riva San Vitale (CH)
- Brusino-Arsizio (CH)
- Porto Ceresio (I)
- Brusimpiano (I)
- Lavena Ponte Tresa (I)
- Ponte Tresa (I/CH)
- Caslano (CH)
- Magliaso (CH)
- Agno (CH)
- Agnuzzo (CH)
- Montagnola (CH)
- Carabietta (CH)
- Figino (CH)
- Morcote (CH)
- Melide (CH)
- Paradiso (CH)

== Navigation ==
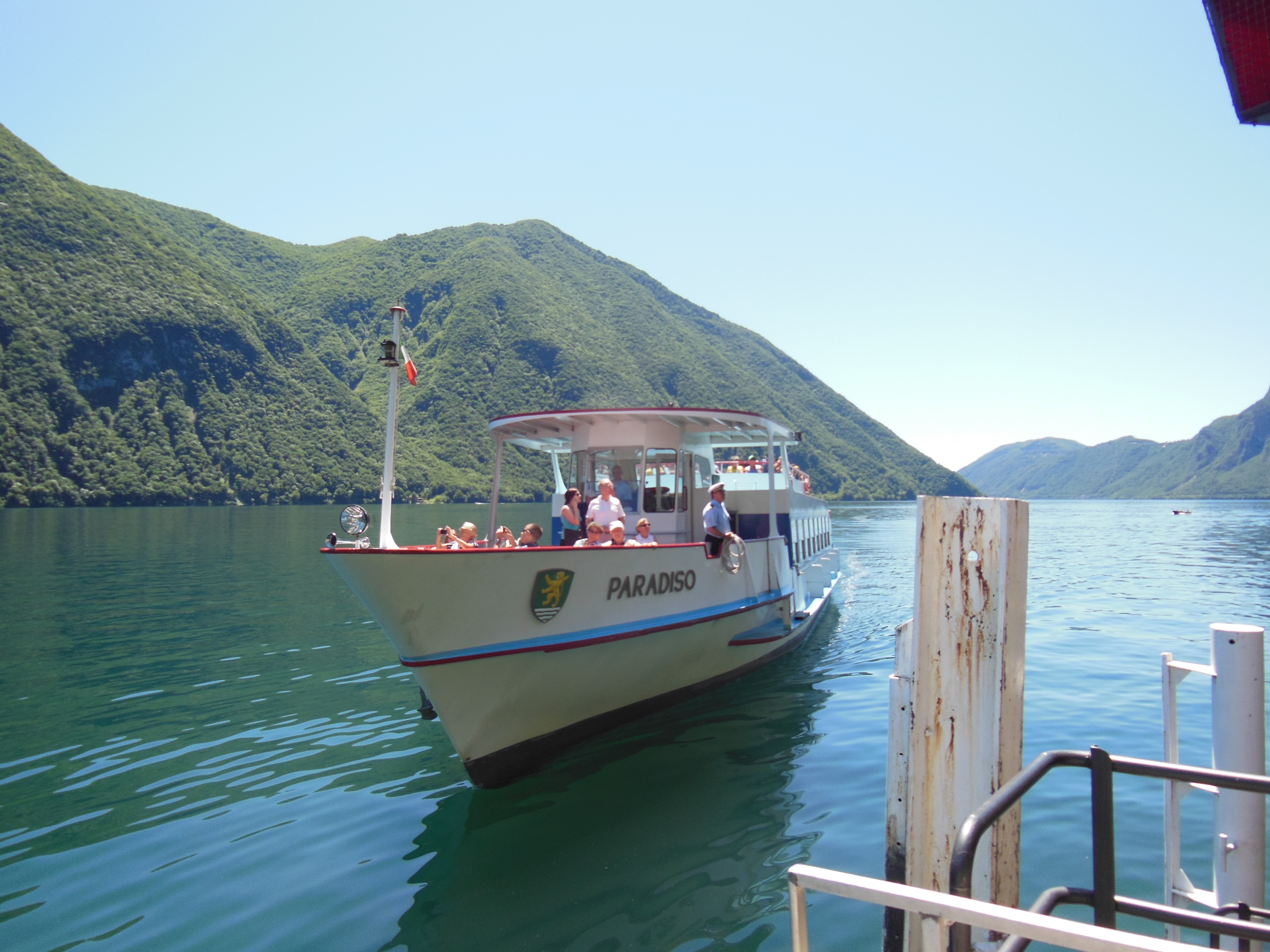
One of SNL's passenger boats arriving at Gandria

The lake is navigable, and used by a considerable number of private vessels. Passenger boats of the Società Navigazione del Lago di Lugano (SNL) provide services on the lake, principally for tourist purposes, but also connecting Lugano with other lakeside communities, some of which have no road access.

Fishery in the lake (and Lake Maggiore) is regulated by a 1986 agreement between Switzerland and Italy. The current agreement on navigation dates from 1992.

== Pollution ==
Pollution has long been a problem in Lake Lugano. In the 1960s and 1970s it was officially forbidden to bathe in the lake. Despite the continued introduction of sewage treatment plants, such as in Gandria, factors, such as lake retention time and lack of oxygen and increasing phosphorus concentrations, means it is unclear if the lake will recover.

The Federal Office for the Environment's last published report on Lake Lugano dates from 1995. To summarise that report:

- at that time measurements indicated some improvement, but this was unlikely to continue at the same pace
- there were almost permanent polluted layers at the bottom of the very deep lake
- oxygen was scarce and could not be found below 100 m (330 ft) depth
- as a result phosphorus levels were increasing at this depth
- phosphorus levels in the northern basin were six times too high and in the southern basin twice too high
- will take many decades to clean
- the lake could be said to be "chronically sick"
- in the Italian part of the lake only 20% of the population were connected to sewage treatment plants with phosphorus filters (not that all Swiss areas were connected either).

The Swiss-Italian organisation CIPAIS in its most recent published report says:

Considering the results obtained in 2009 it can be affirmed that, notwithstanding the observed improvement, Lake Lugano is still in a state of high eutrophication, the highest among Swiss lakes.

The Italian environmental group Legambiente, in its 2007 study of all northern Italian lakes, found Lake Lugano to be the most polluted of all.

All water samples were well beyond the legal limits. The polluted sites should not be bathed in for health reasons. Bacteria can cause in the worst case, skin infections, diarrhoea and vomiting.

According to Legambiente, the only reason swimming was not banned on the Italian Lakes was because the state of Lombardy changed the law. They state that pollution levels in the lakes do not conform to European rulings and the lack of sewage treatment is illegal.

Their 2010 measurements found samples taken at Ponte Tresa, Osteno and Porto Ceresio to be "heavily polluted" (more than 1,000 UFC/100 ml intestinal enterococci and/or greater than 2000 UFC/100 ml E. coli).

== Fauna ==
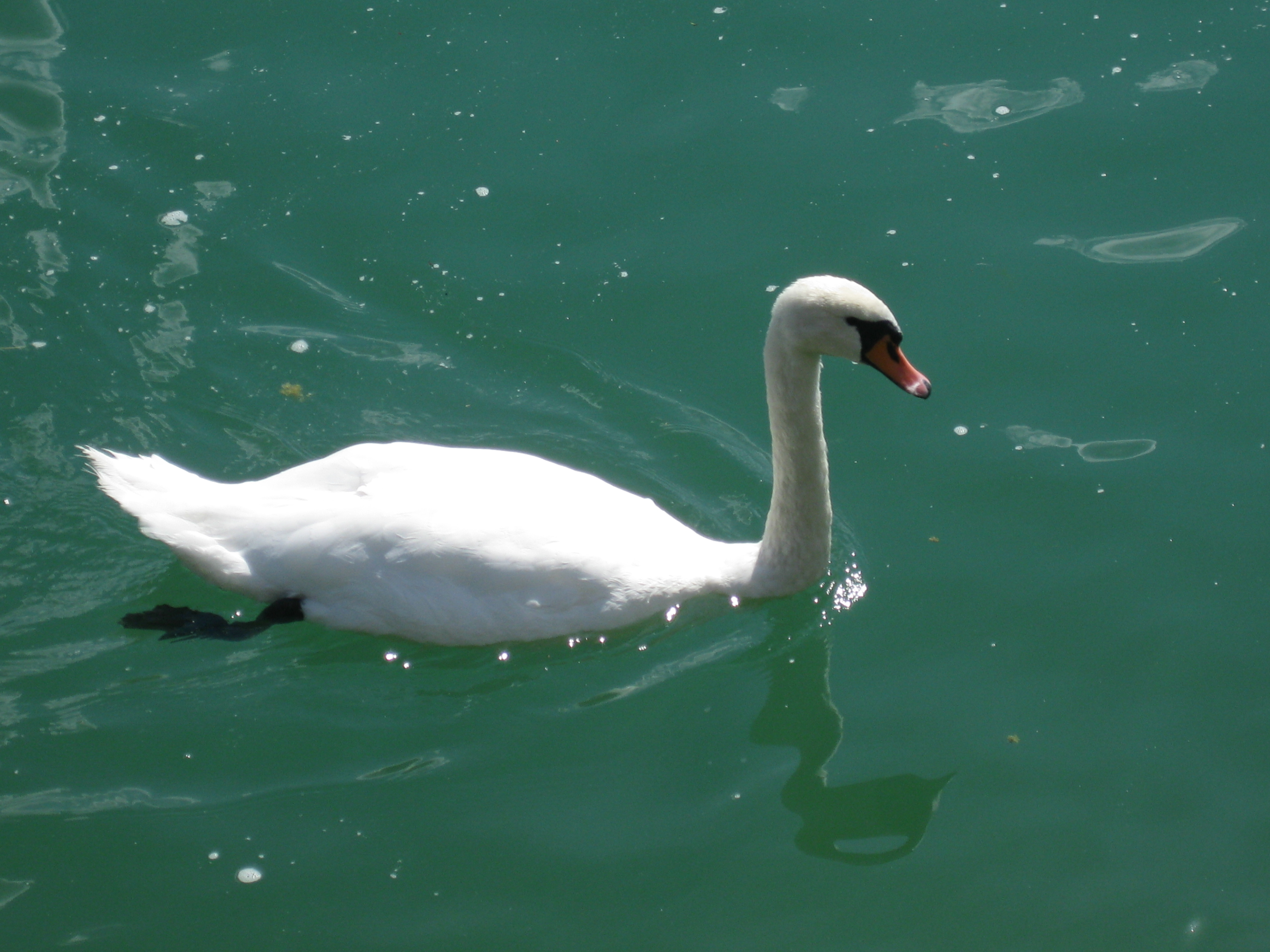
Mute swan in Porlezza, Italy

The lake is full of fish. Apart from a few protected areas, such as the mouth of the River Cuccio in Porlezza, fishing is allowed anywhere, although according to various regulations. Protected species are the bleak and the white clawed crayfish (Austropotamobius pallipes). The bleak is almost extinct here, unlike in Lago Maggiore, and planning is under way for the controlled repopulation of the lake, particularly around Ponte Tresa.

In 1895 the brook trout was introduced from Lake Zug, while between 1894 and 1897 the common whitefish was introduced. Since 1950 attempts have been made to introduce the whitefish Coregonus macrophthalmus from Lake Neuchâtel, but it has not established itself effectively.

The common roach is present in large numbers and took around ten years to colonise the entire lake, thereby replacing the bleak. Still present are the European chub, tench, carp and a few examples of European perch, largemouth bass, zander and burbot. Recently the wels catfish and pigo have been spotted.

== Fossils ==
The whole area behind the southern shores of Lake Lugano is rich in fossils. The focal point of these fossil deposits is Monte San Giorgio, where since the 19th century many fossils have been found dating from the mid-Triassic (around 220 million years ago). The deposits on Monte San Giorgio stretch towards the west into Italian territory and the deposits of Besano. Fossils dating from the early Jurassic (around 180 million years ago) have also been found along the southern shores but more towards the east and Osteno.

== Panorama ==
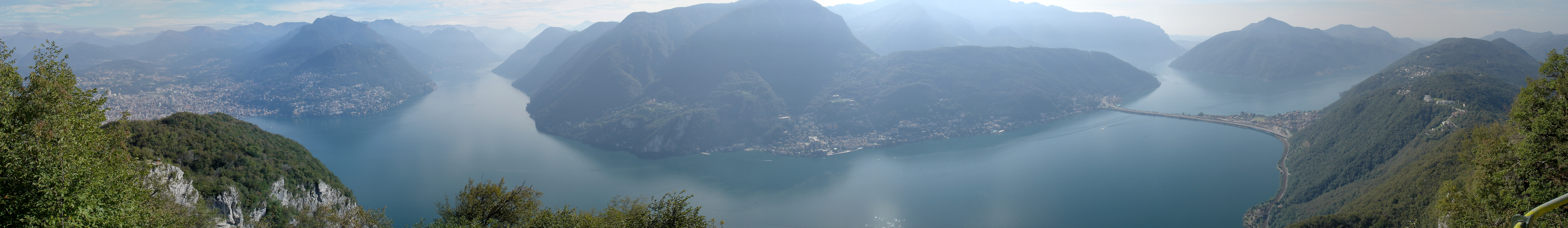
View of Lake Lugano from Monte San Salvatore, with Lugano to the left and the Melide causeway to the right

== See also ==
- Italian Lakes
- List of lakes of Italy
