= Carabelli =

Carabelli is a surname of Italian origin. Notable people with this surname include:

- Adolfo Carabelli (1893–1947), Argentine piano player, composer and bandleader
- Camilo Ugo Carabelli (born 1999), Argentine tennis player
- Carmela Carabelli (1910–1978), Italian mystic and spiritual daughter of Saint Pio of Pietrelcina
- Francesco Carabelli, Italian sculptor of the 18th century
- Georg Carabelli, Edler von Lunkaszprie (1787–1842), Hungarian dentist and professor
- Gianni Carabelli (born 1979), Italian athlete
- Horacio Carabelli (born 1968), Uruguay-born Brazilian sailor and engineer
