= Val Mara =

- Municipality
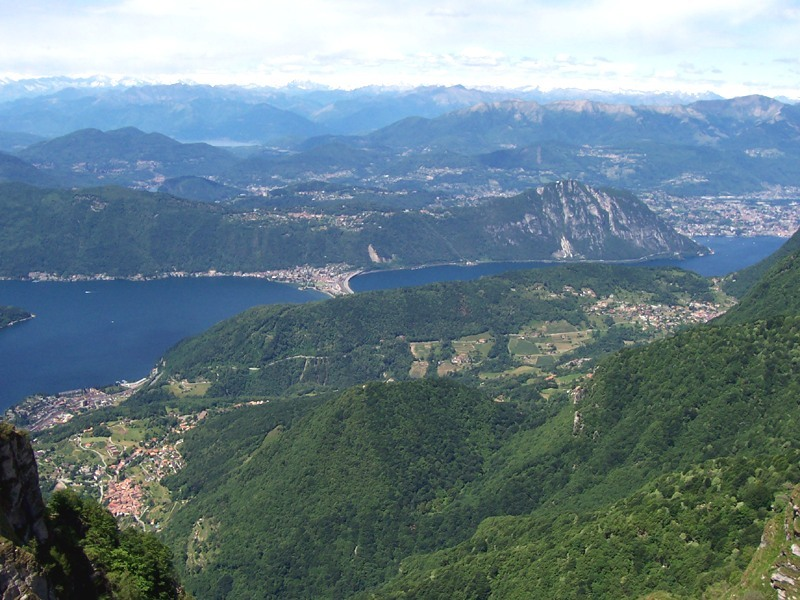
- Val Mara

- Flag Coat of arms
- Location of Val Mara
- Location within Switzerland Location within Canton of Ticino
- Coordinates: 45°55′N 8°59′E
- Country: Switzerland
- Canton: Ticino
- District: Lugano

Government
  - Mayor: Sindaco

Area
  - Total: 11.05 km^{2} (4.27 sq mi)

Population (December 2021)
  - Total: 2,996
  - Density: 271.1/km^{2} (702.2/sq mi)
- Time zone: UTC+01:00 (CET)
  - Summer (DST): UTC+02:00 (CEST)
- Postal code: 6817, 6818, 6821
- SFOS number: 5240
- ISO 3166 code: CH-TI
- Surrounded by: Arogno, Bissone, Riva San Vitale, Mendrisio, Castel San Pietro, Centro Valle Intelvi (Italy), Alta Valle Intelvi (Italy)
- Website: http://valmara.ch/

Val Mara is a municipality in the district of Lugano in the canton of Ticino in Switzerland. It was created on 10 April 2022 through the merger of Maroggia, Melano and Rovio.
