= Arogno =

- Municipality
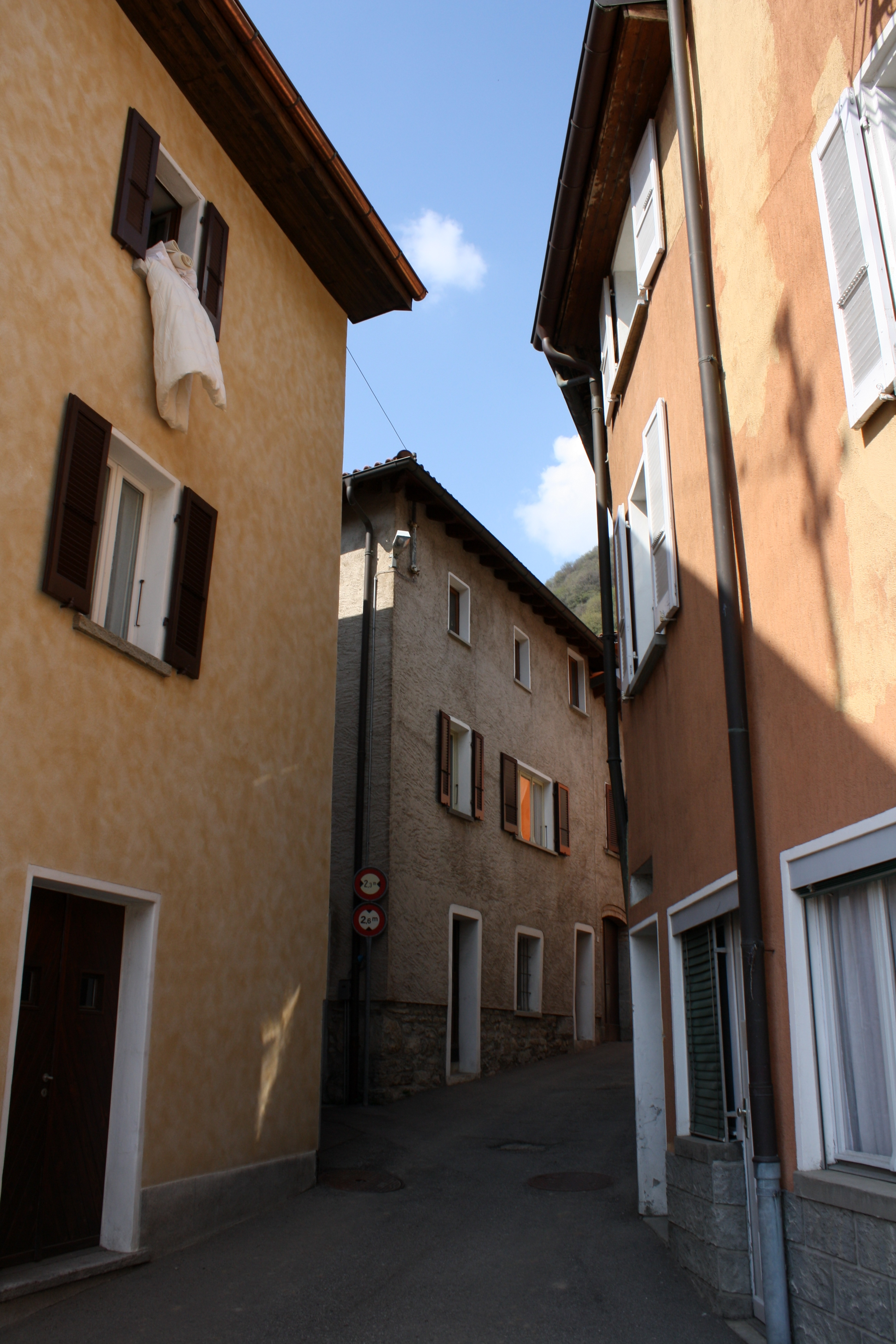
- Arogno village

- Flag Coat of arms
- Location of Arogno
- Location within Switzerland Location within Canton of Ticino
- Coordinates: 45°58′N 8°59′E
- Country: Switzerland
- Canton: Ticino
- District: Lugano

Government
  - Mayor: Sindaco; Emanuele Stauffer Arogno 2021

Area
  - Total: 8.53 km^{2} (3.29 sq mi)
- Elevation: 606 m (1,988 ft)

Population (December 2002)
  - Total: 970
  - Density: 110/km^{2} (290/sq mi)
- Time zone: UTC+01:00 (CET)
  - Summer (DST): UTC+02:00 (CEST)
- Postal code: 6822
- SFOS number: 5144
- ISO 3166 code: CH-TI
- Surrounded by: Bissone, Campione d'Italia (Italy), Alta Valle Intelvi (Italy), Lugano, Maroggia, Rovio
- Website: www.arogno.ch

Arogno is a municipality in the district of Lugano in the canton of Ticino, located south of Lake Lugano in the southernmost tip of Switzerland.

== History ==
Arogno has been inhabited since late antiquity, because of its strategic location along the transit route between Seprio and Isola Comacina. During the Langobardian era, Arogno expanded into a major fortified garrison. In 859 the monastery of S. Ambrogio in Milan was listed as the owner of property in Arogno. On 24 February 1798, the village joined the Republic of Riva San Vitale. Starting in 1797-98 there were repeated territorial conflict with Campione d'Italia, which were not settled until 1861.

The parish church of S. Stefano (originally S. Nicolao) is first mentioned in 810. In 1581 it broke from the Mother Church of Riva San Vitale to form a parish. Between 1591 and the late 17th Century the Ursulines had a house in Arogno. East of the village is the romanesque Chapel of S. Michael, which was rebuilt in the Baroque style.

The local economy depended on agriculture and animal husbandry, as well as revenue from successful emigrants (mostly working in construction). For a short time, there was a small coal mining industry in the municipality. In 1873 and 1888, two factories for the manufacture of components for watches, opened in Arogno. For decades these were the major industries in the municipality. Today, much of the population works in the services sector or commutes to neighboring cities.

== Geography ==
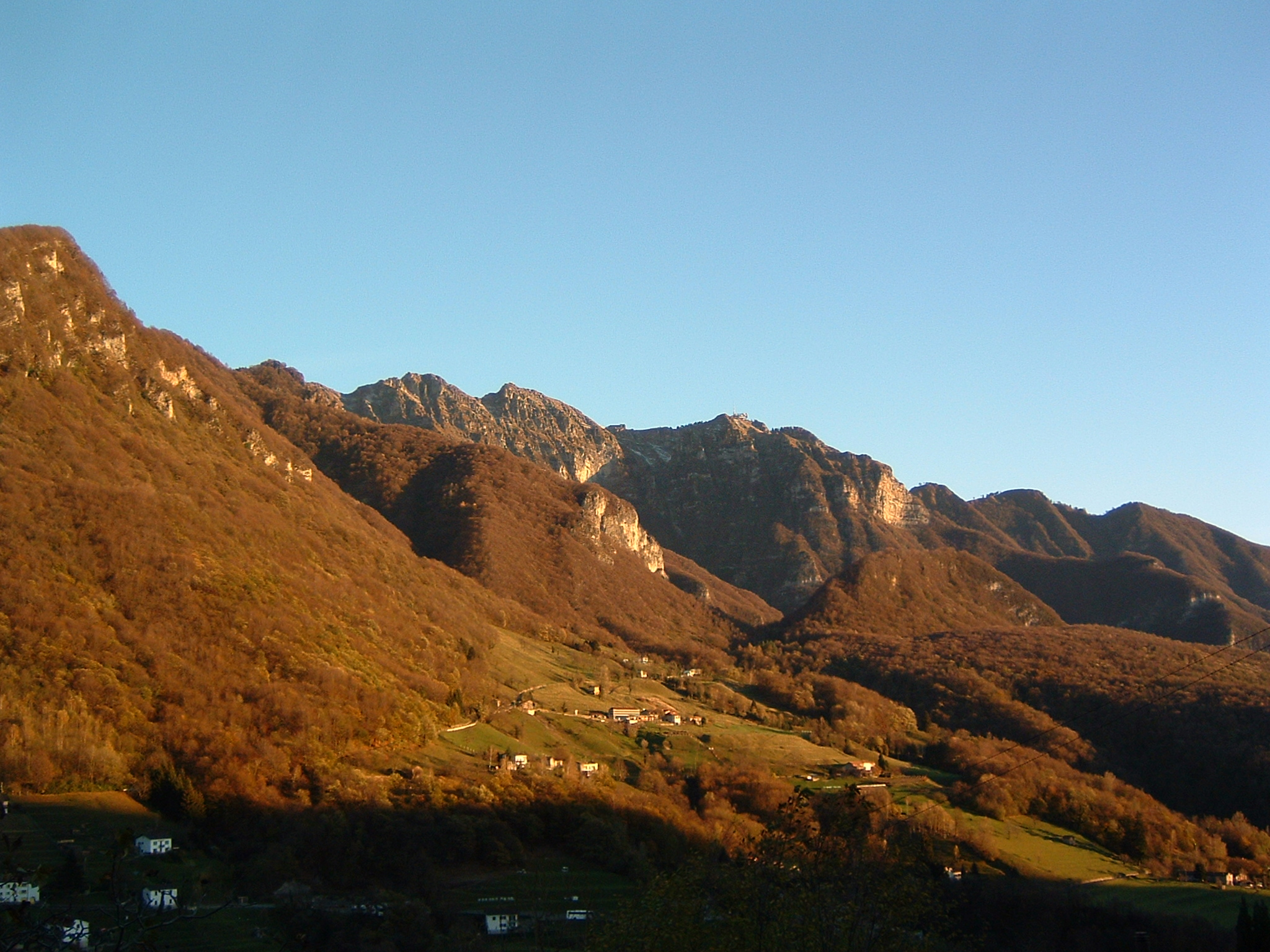
Mount Generoso at sunset seen from Arogno

Aerial view of Arogno by Photoramacolor AG (1991)

Aerial view of Monte Generoso with Arogno and Lugano in the background, by Walter Mittelholzer (1919)

Arogno is located on a high plateau in the Val Mara, about 2 km (1.2 mi) from the Italian border near the enclave of Campione. It consists of the village of Arogno and many hamlets including Pugerna.

Arogno has an area, as of 1997, of 8.5 square kilometers (3.3 sq mi). Of this area, 1.03 km^{2} (0.40 sq mi) or 12.1% is used for agricultural purposes, while 7.18 km^{2} (2.77 sq mi) or 84.5% is forested. Of the rest of the land, 0.46 km^{2} (0.18 sq mi) or 5.4% is settled (buildings or roads) and 0.07 km^{2} (17 acres) or 0.8% is unproductive land.

Of the built up area, housing and buildings made up 3.3% and transportation infrastructure made up 1.6%. Out of the forested land, 79.5% of the total land area is heavily forested and 4.9% is covered with orchards or small clusters of trees. Of the agricultural land, 8.6% is used for growing crops and 3.3% is used for alpine pastures. Of the unproductive areas, and .

== Coat of arms ==
The blazon of the municipal coat of arms is Or a he-goat's head caboshed sable and in chief a mullet of five gules.

== Demographics ==
Arogno has a population (as of December 2020) of 986. As of 2008, 12.1% of the population are resident foreign nationals. Over the last 10 years (1997–2007) the population has changed at a rate of 10.5%.

Most of the population (as of 2000) speaks Italian (85.2%), with German being second most common (9.8%) and French being third (2.1%). Of the Swiss national languages (as of 2000), 95 speak German, 20 people speak French, 826 people speak Italian, and 1 person speaks Romansh. The remainder (27 people) speak another language.

As of 2008, the gender distribution of the population was 48.4% male and 51.6% female. The population was made up of 413 Swiss men (41.5% of the population), and 68 (6.8%) non-Swiss men. There were 458 Swiss women (46.1%), and 55 (5.5%) non-Swiss women.

In 2008 there were 11 live births to Swiss citizens and 1 birth to non-Swiss citizens, and in same time span there were 9 deaths of Swiss citizens and 1 non-Swiss citizen death. Ignoring immigration and emigration, the population of Swiss citizens increased by 2 while the foreign population remained the same. There were 3 non-Swiss men and 1 non-Swiss woman who immigrated from another country to Switzerland. The total Swiss population change in 2008 (from all sources, including moves across municipal borders) was a decrease of 0 and the non-Swiss population change was an increase of 4 people. This represents a population growth rate of 0.4%.

The age distribution, as of 2009, in Arogno is; 106 children or 10.7% of the population are between 0 and 9 years old and 125 teenagers or 12.6% are between 10 and 19. Of the adult population, 75 people or 7.5% of the population are between 20 and 29 years old. 124 people or 12.5% are between 30 and 39, 165 people or 16.6% are between 40 and 49, and 135 people or 13.6% are between 50 and 59. The senior population distribution is 106 people or 10.7% of the population are between 60 and 69 years old, 91 people or 9.2% are between 70 and 79, there are 67 people or 6.7% who are over 80.

As of 2000, there were 411 private households in the municipality, and an average of 2.3 persons per household. In 2000 there were 270 single family homes (or 67.2% of the total) out of a total of 402 inhabited buildings. There were 76 two family buildings (18.9%) and 28 multi-family buildings (7.0%). There were also 28 buildings in the municipality that were multipurpose buildings (used for both housing and commercial or another purpose).

The vacancy rate for the municipality, in 2008, was 1.04%. In 2000 there were 546 apartments in the municipality. The most common apartment size was the 5 room apartment of which there were 175. There were 14 single room apartments and 175 apartments with five or more rooms. Of these apartments, a total of 407 apartments (74.5% of the total) were permanently occupied, while 112 apartments (20.5%) were seasonally occupied and 27 apartments (4.9%) were empty. As of 2007, the construction rate of new housing units was 3 new units per 1000 residents.

The historical population is given in the following table:

year	population
1591	c. 380
1670	478
1850	756
1900	1,075
1950	820
2000	969

== Heritage sites of national significance ==
The Parish Church of S. Stefano is listed as a Swiss heritage site of national significance. The entire village of Arogno is part of the Inventory of Swiss Heritage Sites.

=== Sights ===
Arogno can be a starting place for hiking trips on Monte Generoso.

== Notable people ==
- Luca Antonio Colomba (1674–1737) a Swiss Baroque painter born at Arogno. His style was distinguished for its happy compositions and its careful design, as also for the delicate and tender colours. He painted in oil and fresco.
- Giovanni Battista Innocenzo Colombo (1717-1801) a Swiss painter. For 18 years, he was the court architect at Stuttgart and stage set designer for the Duke. From 1769 to 1771, he was the stage set designer for the Teatro Regio, substituting for the members of the Galliari family. He was the nephew of Luca Antonio Colomba, stated above.
- Adamo d'Arogno (ca. 1180 - ca. 1240). Born in Arogno. Architect of the Trento Cathedral.

== Politics ==
In the 2007 federal election the most popular party was the FDP which received 30.51% of the vote. The next three most popular parties were the SP (25.26%), the Ticino League (18.49%) and the CVP (10.93%). In the federal election, a total of 342 votes were cast, and the voter turnout was 49.1%.

In the 2007 Ticino Gran Consiglio election, there were a total of 661 registered voters in Arogno, of which 422 or 63.8% voted. 8 blank ballots and 3 null ballots were cast, leaving 411 valid ballots in the election. The most popular party was the PLRT which received 104 or 25.3% of the vote. The next three most popular parties were; the PS (with 88 or 21.4%), the LEGA (with 78 or 19.0%) and the SSI (with 68 or 16.5%).

In the 2007 Ticino Consiglio di Stato election, 4 blank ballots and 3 null ballots were cast, leaving 415 valid ballots in the election. The most popular party was the LEGA which received 105 or 25.3% of the vote. The next three most popular parties were; the PLRT (with 98 or 23.6%), the PLRT (with 98 or 23.6%) and the SSI (with 67 or 16.1%).

== Economy ==
As of 2007, Arogno had an unemployment rate of 1.53%. As of 2005, there were 26 people employed in the primary economic sector and about 13 businesses involved in this sector. 17 people were employed in the secondary sector and there were 6 businesses in this sector. 127 people were employed in the tertiary sector, with 27 businesses in this sector. There were 406 residents of the municipality who were employed in some capacity, of which females made up 39.7% of the workforce.

In 2000, there were 129 workers who commuted into the municipality and 290 workers who commuted away. The municipality is a net exporter of workers, with about 2.2 workers leaving the municipality for every one entering. About 32.6% of the workforce coming into Arogno are coming from outside Switzerland. Of the working population, 6.9% used public transportation to get to work, and 67% used a private car.

As of 2009, there were 2 hotels in Arogno.

== Religion ==
From the 2000 census, 724 or 74.7% were Roman Catholic, while 88 or 9.1% belonged to the Swiss Reformed Church. There are 119 individuals (or about 12.28% of the population) who belong to another church (not listed on the census), and 38 individuals (or about 3.92% of the population) did not answer the question.

== Education ==
The entire Swiss population is generally well educated. In Arogno about 73.5% of the population (between age 25-64) have completed either non-mandatory upper secondary education or additional higher education (either university or a Fachhochschule).

In Arogno there were a total of 193 students (as of 2009). The Ticino education system provides up to three years of non-mandatory kindergarten and in Arogno there were 28 children in kindergarten. The primary school program lasts for five years and includes both a standard school and a special school. In the municipality, 51 students attended the standard primary schools and 2 students attended the special school. In the lower secondary school system, students either attend a two-year middle school followed by a two-year pre-apprenticeship or they attend a four-year program to prepare for higher education. There were 60 students in the two-year middle school, while 27 students were in the four-year advanced program.

The upper secondary school includes several options, but at the end of the upper secondary program, a student will be prepared to enter a trade or to continue on to a university or college. In Ticino, vocational students may either attend school while working on their internship or apprenticeship (which takes three or four years) or may attend school followed by an internship or apprenticeship (which takes one year as a full-time student or one and a half to two years as a part-time student). There were 10 vocational students who were attending school full-time and 14 who attend part-time.

The professional program lasts three years and prepares a student for a job in engineering, nursing, computer science, business, tourism and similar fields. There was 1 student in the professional program.

As of 2000, there were 1 student in Arogno who came from another municipality, while 79 residents attended schools outside the municipality.
