= Carmela Carabelli =

Italian mystic

Carmela Carabelli, born Carmelina Negri (Melegnano, May 9, 1910 – Milan, November 25, 1978), better known as Mamma Carmela (in English: Mother Carmela), was a spiritual daughter of Pio of Pietrelcina and a famous Italian mystic.

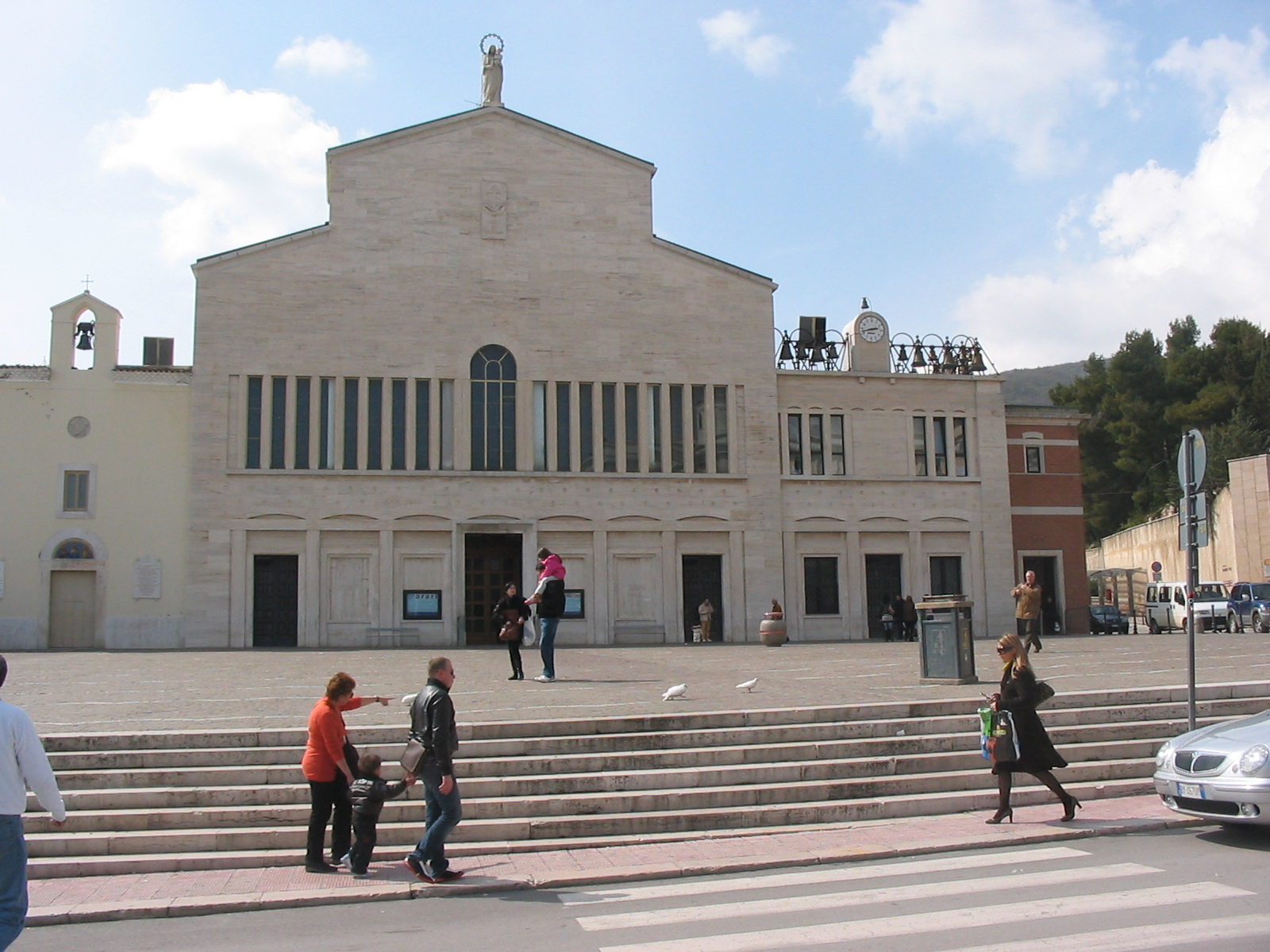
The Church-Shrine and the Convent of Saint Pio of Pietrelcina in San Giovanni Rotondo, Italy.

== See also ==
- Visions of Jesus and Mary
