= Castel San Pietro =

- Municipality
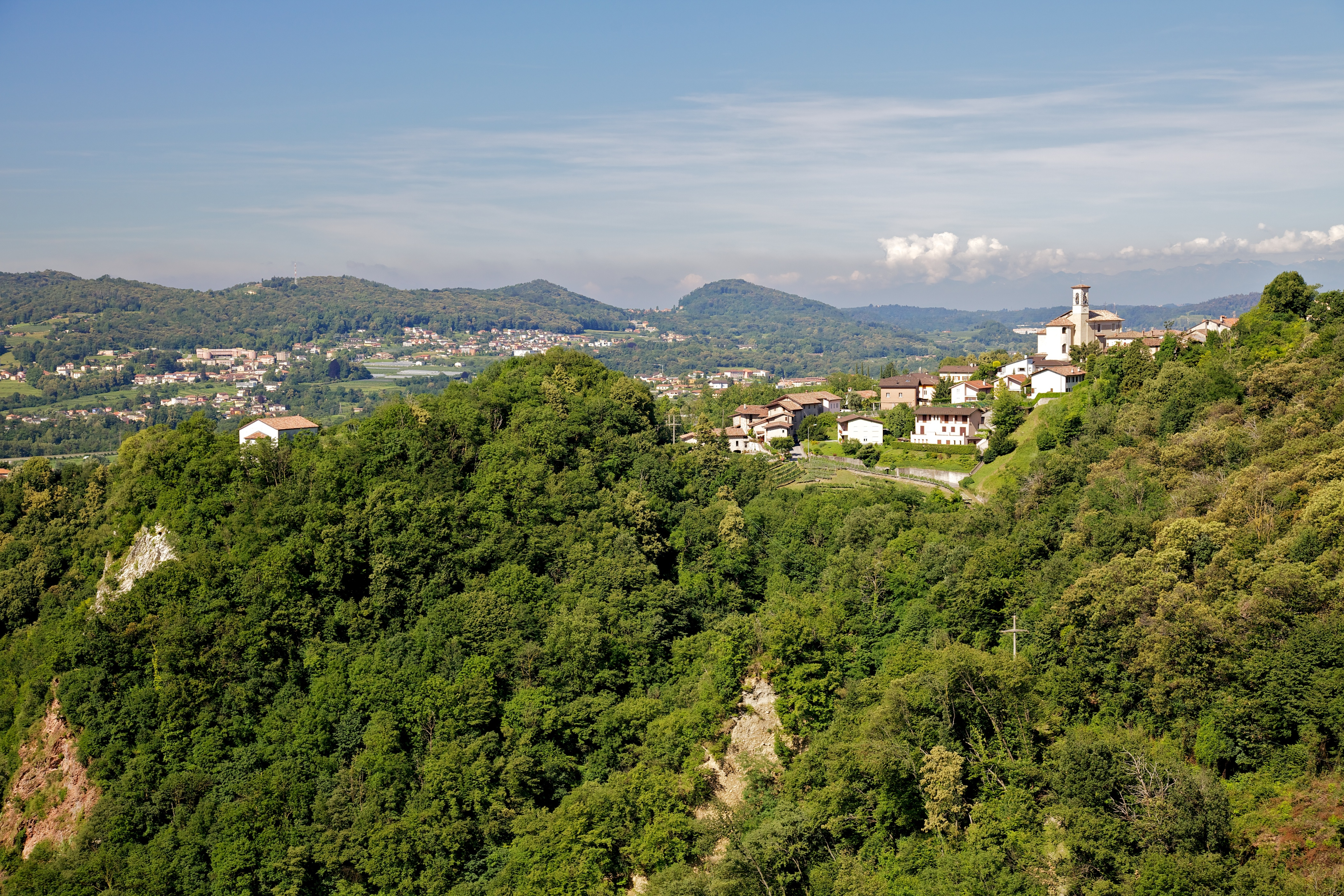

- Flag Coat of arms
- Location of Castel San Pietro
- Location within Switzerland Location within Canton of Ticino
- Coordinates: 45°52′N 9°01′E
- Country: Switzerland
- Canton: Ticino
- District: Mendrisio

Government
  - Mayor: Sindaco; Alessia Ponti

Area
  - Total: 11.83 km^{2} (4.57 sq mi)
- Elevation: 442 m (1,450 ft)

Population (December 2005)
  - Total: 2,028
  - Density: 171.4/km^{2} (444.0/sq mi)
- Time zone: UTC+01:00 (CET)
  - Summer (DST): UTC+02:00 (CEST)
- Postal code: 6874
- SFOS number: 5249
- ISO 3166 code: CH-TI
- Surrounded by: Balerna, Bruzella, Cabbio, Caneggio, Centro Valle Intelvi (Italy), Coldrerio, Melano, Mendrisio, Morbio Inferiore, Morbio Superiore, Muggio, Rovio
- Website: castelsanpietro.ch

Castel San Pietro is a municipality in the district of Mendrisio in the canton of Ticino in Switzerland.

== History ==
Castel San Pietro is first mentioned in 1171 as Castellum Sancti Petri. A settlement near the village was mentioned in 865, when an Imperial knight named Sigeradus, granted the area to the monastery of Sant'Ambrogio in Milan. The municipality was originally part of the Vicinanza of Balerna. By 1270 it had an Imperial palace and it was given to Como Cathedral. During the war between Milan and Como (1118–27) a castle was built, which was the origin of the municipality's name. By the mid-13th century, it passed back and forth between the Bishop of Como and the Russ and Rusconi family. At the end of the 14th century, it finally fell into the hands of the family. In the 15th century, it became part of the Pieve of Balerna., claims it made claims. Bishop Boniface built a church in the Castle in 1343. It was later named in memory of the bloody feud between the Bosia and Rusconi family in 1390, as the "Red Church".

Since 1626, Castel San Pietro, has been a separate parish. The parish church of S. Eusebio was mentioned in 1270, but the existing building dates from the 17th–18th centuries and was restored in 1912.

In the Middle Ages and the early modern era the Catholic Church (Church of S. Fedele and the Bishop of Como) and powerful, local families (Albrici, Rusconi, and after the 15th century, the Turconi, as witnessed by their Villa Turconi a Loverciano) possessed lands in and around the village. The land was mostly farmed in sharecropping and was all tithed. These charges meant that the land could not always feed the entire population, so that some of the population were compelled to emigrate. At the beginning of the 20th century, a small industrial base (tobacco processing, distilleries) developed in the valley. In the 1960s and 1970s other companies (textiles, watches and metal processing) moved into the village.

== Geography ==
Aerial view (1964)

The municipality of Castel San Pietro is located in the district of Mendrisio. It covers much of the land below Monte Generoso, including the summit station of the Monte Generoso Railway, but not the mountain summit itself, which is in the municipality of Rovio. The municipality consists of the village of Castel San Pietro, which is made up of the sections of Corteglia, Gorla, Loverciano, Obino as well as others. Since 2004, the former municipalities of Casima and Monte as well as the settlement of Campora (formerly part of the municipality of Caneggio) have been part of Castel San Pietro.

Castel San Pietro has an area, as of 1997, of 11.83 square kilometers (4.57 sq mi). Of this area, 2.02 km^{2} (0.78 sq mi) or 17.1% is used for agricultural purposes, while 4.66 km^{2} (1.80 sq mi) or 39.4% is forested. Of the rest of the land, 0.81 km^{2} (0.31 sq mi) or 6.8% is settled (buildings or roads), 0.03 km^{2} (7.4 acres) or 0.3% is either rivers or lakes and 0.17 km^{2} (0.066 sq mi) or 1.4% is unproductive land.

Of the built up area, housing and buildings made up 4.8% and transportation infrastructure made up 1.3%. Out of the forested land, 36.3% of the total land area is heavily forested and 3.0% is covered with orchards or small clusters of trees. Of the agricultural land, 7.5% is used for growing crops, while 4.7% is used for orchards or vine crops and 4.8% is used for alpine pastures. All the water in the municipality is flowing water. Of the unproductive areas, 1.3% is unproductive vegetation.

== Coat of arms ==
The blazon of the municipal coat of arms is Gules a castle with one tower argent and coupeaux vert.

== Demographics ==
Castel San Pietro has a population (as of December 2020) of 2,194. As of 2008, 11.2% of the population are resident foreign nationals. Over the last 10 years (1997–2007) the population has changed at a rate of 11.1%.

Most of the population (as of 2000) speaks Italian (90.1%), with German being second most common (6.4%) and French being third (1.1%). Of the Swiss national languages (as of 2000), 94 speak German, 19 people speak French, 1,573 people speak Italian, and 1 person speaks Romansh. The remainder (41 people) speak another language.

As of 2008, the gender distribution of the population was 48.5% male and 51.5% female. The population was made up of 888 Swiss men (42.7% of the population), and 121 (5.8%) non-Swiss men. There were 979 Swiss women (47.0%), and 94 (4.5%) non-Swiss women.

In 2008 there were 18 live births to Swiss citizens and 1 birth to non-Swiss citizens, and in same time span there were 19 deaths of Swiss citizens and 2 non-Swiss citizen deaths. Ignoring immigration and emigration, the population of Swiss citizens decreased by 1 while the foreign population decreased by 1. There was 1 Swiss man and 3 Swiss women who emigrated from Switzerland. At the same time, there were 9 non-Swiss men and 9 non-Swiss women who immigrated from another country to Switzerland. The total Swiss population change in 2008 (from all sources, including moves across municipal borders) was an increase of 5 and the non-Swiss population change was an increase of 20 people. This represents a population growth rate of 1.2%.

The age distribution, as of 2009, in Castel San Pietro is; 175 children or 8.4% of the population are between 0 and 9 years old and 200 teenagers or 9.6% are between 10 and 19. Of the adult population, 221 people or 10.6% of the population are between 20 and 29 years old. 262 people or 12.6% are between 30 and 39, 348 people or 16.7% are between 40 and 49, and 282 people or 13.5% are between 50 and 59. The senior population distribution is 279 people or 13.4% of the population are between 60 and 69 years old, 175 people or 8.4% are between 70 and 79, there are 140 people or 6.7% who are over 80.

As of 2000, there were 742 private households in the municipality, and an average of 2.4 persons per household. In 2000 there were 332 single family homes (or 64.0% of the total) out of a total of 519 inhabited buildings. There were 137 multi-family buildings (26.4%), along with 24 multi-purpose buildings that were mostly used for housing (4.6%) and 26 other use buildings (commercial or industrial) that also had some housing (5.0%). Of the single family homes 25 were built before 1919, while 32 were built between 1990 and 2000. The greatest number of single family homes (72) were built between 1961 and 1970.

In 2000 there were 775 apartments in the municipality. The most common apartment size was 4 rooms of which there were 258. There were 23 single room apartments and 284 apartments with five or more rooms. Of these apartments, a total of 674 apartments (87.0% of the total) were permanently occupied, while 66 apartments (8.5%) were seasonally occupied and 35 apartments (4.5%) were empty. The vacancy rate for the municipality, in 2008, was 0.69%. As of 2007, the construction rate of new housing units was 2.4 new units per 1000 residents.

The historical population is given in the following chart:

== Heritage sites of national significance ==
The Church of S. Pietro (Red Church) and the ruins of the castle, the Parish Church of S. Eusebio and Villa Turconi a Loverciano are listed as Swiss heritage site of national significance. The villages of Casima, Castel San Pietro, Campora and Monte are all part of the Inventory of Swiss Heritage Sites.

== Politics ==
In the 2007 federal election the most popular party was the CVP which received 36.18% of the vote. The next three most popular parties were the FDP (19.66%), the SP (16.85%) and the Ticino League (14.35%). In the federal election, a total of 899 votes were cast, and the voter turnout was 58.5%.

In the 2007 Gran Consiglio election, there were a total of 1,594 registered voters in Castel San Pietro, of which 1,159 or 72.7% voted. 23 blank ballots were cast, leaving 1,136 valid ballots in the election. The most popular party was the PPD+GenGiova which received 324 or 28.5% of the vote. The next three most popular parties were; the PLRT (with 228 or 20.1%), the SSI (with 201 or 17.7%) and the PS (with 154 or 13.6%).

In the 2007 Consiglio di Stato election, 21 blank ballots and 2 null ballots were cast, leaving 1,136 valid ballots in the election. The most popular party was the PPD which received 307 or 27.0% of the vote. The next three most popular parties were; the LEGA (with 228 or 20.1%), the PLRT (with 198 or 17.4%) and the SSI (with 184 or 16.2%).

== Economy ==
As of 2007, Castel San Pietro had an unemployment rate of 2.75%. As of 2005, there were 71 people employed in the primary economic sector and about 24 businesses involved in this sector. 422 people were employed in the secondary sector and there were 25 businesses in this sector. 354 people were employed in the tertiary sector, with 64 businesses in this sector.

There were 768 residents of the municipality who were employed in some capacity, of which females made up 39.6% of the workforce. In 2008's statistics the total number of full-time equivalent jobs was 755. The number of jobs in the primary sector was 42, of which 41 were in agriculture and 1 was in forestry or lumber production. The number of jobs in the secondary sector was 419, of which 309 or (73.7%) were in manufacturing and 110 (26.3%) were in construction. The number of jobs in the tertiary sector was 294. In the tertiary sector; 58 or 19.7% were in wholesale or retail sales or the repair of motor vehicles, 8 or 2.7% were in the movement and storage of goods, 52 or 17.7% were in a hotel or restaurant, 2 or 0.7% were in the information industry, 5 or 1.7% were the insurance or financial industry, 19 or 6.5% were technical professionals or scientists, 16 or 5.4% were in education and 85 or 28.9% were in health care.

In 2000, there were 678 workers who commuted into the municipality and 592 workers who commuted away. The municipality is a net importer of workers, with about 1.1 workers entering the municipality for every one leaving. About 36.1% of the workforce coming into Castel San Pietro are coming from outside Switzerland, while 0.7% of the locals commute out of Switzerland for work. Of the working population, 5.3% used public transportation to get to work, and 67.8% used a private car.

As of 2009, there were 2 hotels in Castel San Pietro.

== Religion ==
From the 2000 census, 1,484 or 85.9% were Roman Catholic, while 87 or 5.0% belonged to the Swiss Reformed Church. There are 123 individuals (or about 7.12% of the population) who belong to another church (not listed on the census), and 34 individuals (or about 1.97% of the population) did not answer the question.

== Education ==
In Castel San Pietro about 78.1% of the population (between age 25-64) have completed either non-mandatory upper secondary education or additional higher education (either University or a Fachhochschule).

In Castel San Pietro there were a total of 302 students (as of 2009). The Ticino education system provides up to three years of non-mandatory kindergarten and in Castel San Pietro there were 42 children in kindergarten. The primary school program lasts for five years and includes both a standard school and a special school. In the municipality, 108 students attended the standard primary schools and 3 students attended the special school. In the lower secondary school system, students either attend a two-year middle school followed by a two-year pre-apprenticeship or they attend a four-year program to prepare for higher education. There were 72 students in the two-year middle school, while 39 students were in the four-year advanced program.

The upper secondary school includes several options, but at the end of the upper secondary program, a student will be prepared to enter a trade or to continue on to a university or college. In Ticino, vocational students may either attend school while working on their internship or apprenticeship (which takes three or four years) or may attend school followed by an internship or apprenticeship (which takes one year as a full-time student or one and a half to two years as a part-time student). There were 21 vocational students who were attending school full-time and 15 who attend part-time.

The professional program lasts three years and prepares a student for a job in engineering, nursing, computer science, business, tourism and similar fields. There were 2 students in the professional program.

As of 2000, there were 16 students in Castel San Pietro who came from another municipality, while 164 residents attended schools outside the municipality.

== Notable people ==
- Antonio Bernasconi (1726 in Castel San Pietro – 1805) a Russian stuccoist, worked on decorations in many palaces and other buildings
- Francesco Carabelli (1737–?) sculptor
