= Francesco Carabelli =

Italian sculptor

Francesco Carabelli was an Italian sculptor of 18th century Milan.

He was born in Castel San Pietro near Mendrisio in 1737. He first trained with his father, then moved to study in Milan where he lived from there on. His model of the Madonna and Child was chosen for the Cathedral of Monza.

== Sources ==
- Boni, Filippo de' (1852). Biografia degli artisti ovvero dizionario della vita e delle opere dei pittori, degli scultori, degli intagliatori, dei tipografi e dei musici di ogni nazione che fiorirono da'tempi più remoti sino á nostri giorni. Seconda Edizione.. Venice; Googlebooks: Presso Andrea Santini e Figlio. p. 185.
