= Riva San Vitale =

- Municipality
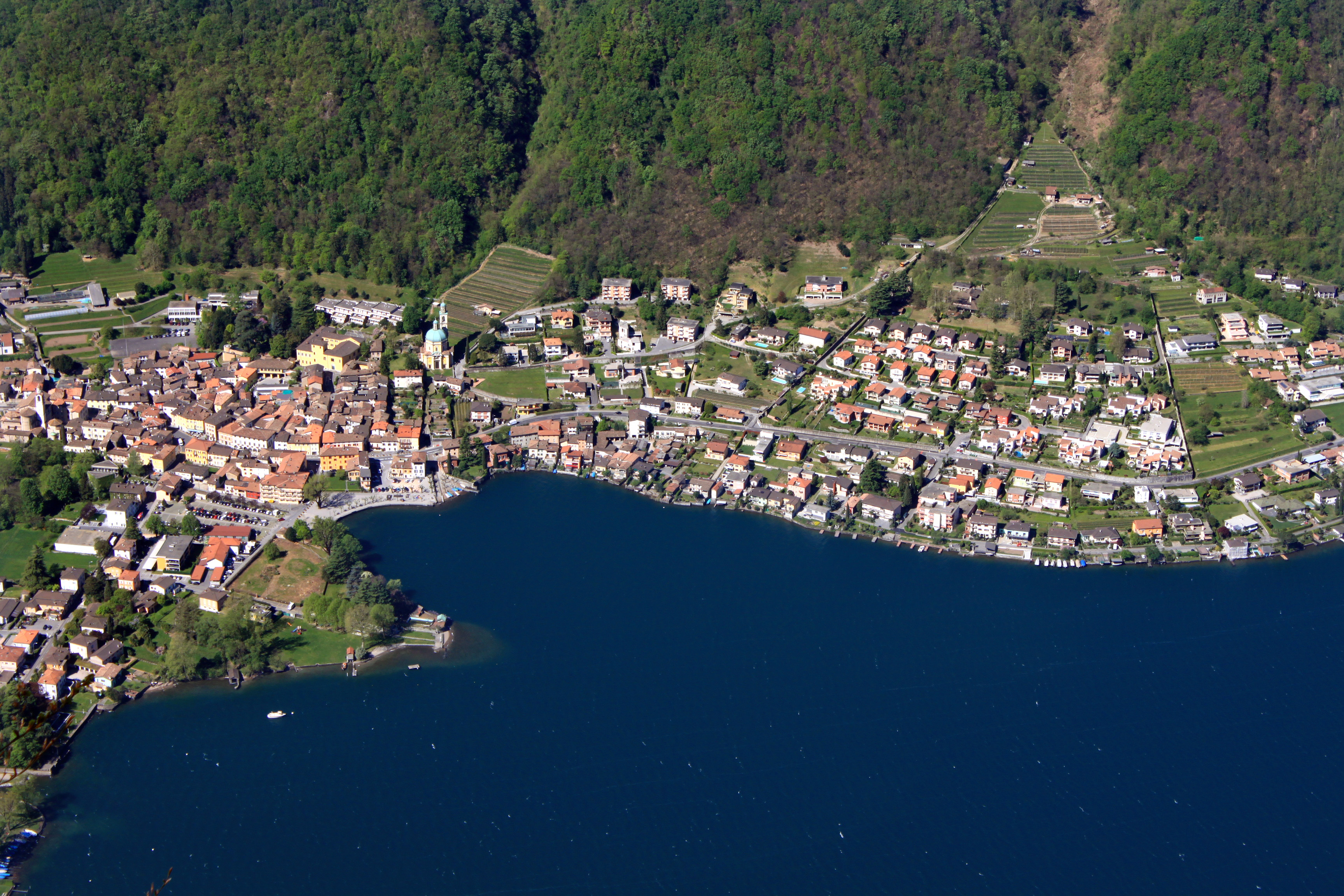

- Flag Coat of arms
- Location of Riva San Vitale
- Location within Switzerland Location within Canton of Ticino
- Coordinates: 45°54′N 8°58′E
- Country: Switzerland
- Canton: Ticino
- District: Mendrisio

Government
  - Executive: Municipio with 7 members
  - Mayor: Sindaco; Antonio Guidali CVP/PDC/PPD (as of April 2021)
  - Parliament: Consiglio comunale with 24 members

Area
  - Total: 5.97 km^{2} (2.31 sq mi)
- Elevation: 273 m (896 ft)

Population (December 2004)
  - Total: 2,410
  - Density: 404/km^{2} (1,050/sq mi)
- Time zone: UTC+01:00 (CET)
  - Summer (DST): UTC+02:00 (CEST)
- Postal code: 6826
- SFOS number: 5263
- ISO 3166 code: CH-TI
- Surrounded by: Bissone, Brusino Arsizio, Capolago, Maroggia, Melano, Mendrisio, Meride, Rancate, Tremona
- Website: rivasanvitale.ch

Riva San Vitale is a municipality in the canton of Ticino in Switzerland, located in the district of Mendrisio.

== History ==
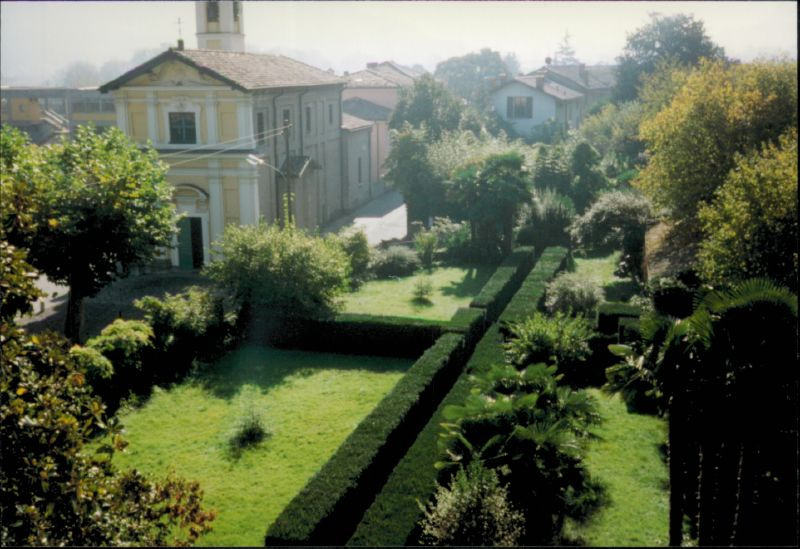
Church of San Rocco

The village in 1946

Riva San Vitale is first mentioned in 774 as Primo Sobenno. In 1115 it was mentioned as Ripa Sancti Vitalis.

The area around Riva San Vitale has probably been settled since the Neolithic. Due to the number of Roman era finds, it appears that there was a significant Roman settlement. A stele from some time before the 3rd century AD mentions that it was made for the inhabitants of vicus subinates. In 1115, the Benedictine abbey of S. Abbondio in Como owned property in Riva San Vitale. During the ten-year war between Como and Milan (1118–27) its port was an important base for the Comasker ships. Riva San Vitale was mentioned in the Charter of Como from 1335 as a burgus. In the Late Middle Ages, it lost its leading position in trade to Capolago, but still enjoyed far-reaching privileges and tax exemption. In the 15th century it was a market town for a short time.

The Parish Church of St. Vitale is first mentioned in 962–966. However, the church likely dates back to the Christianization of the southern foothills of the Alps. It was rebuilt in the late Baroque style in 1756-59 and renovated in 1993–95. The Baptistery of San Giovanni is built on the foundations of a Roman building and is from the early Christian era (c. 500 AD). It was renovated in 1919-26 and again in 1953-55 and is the oldest fully preserved churches in Switzerland. The church of S. Croce was endowed by the Della Croce family and was built in 1582–91. It is one of the most important religious buildings of the late Renaissance in Switzerland.

Agriculture, fisheries and brick works were once the main sources of income. In 1869 a silk weaving plant opened in Segoma, which employed about 100 workers in 1889. In the second half of the 20th century, Riva San Vitale saw an industrial boom that was accompanied by an increase in population. In 2000, approximately three-quarters of workers in the municipality were commuters, especially going to Lugano, Mendrisio and Chiasso. In 2005, the manufacturing sector provided 45% and the services sector 52% of all jobs. The Collegio Baragiola building was used as a secondary school from 1855 until 1925. In 1926, the Istituto Canisio, a special school for the disabled, opened in the building.

In 1910, the Mendrisio electric tramway opened, linking a northern terminus in Riva San Vitale with Capolago, Mendrisio, Balerna and Chiasso. The section of the line in Riva San Vitale closed in 1948 and was replaced by a bus service.

=== The Pieve of Riva San Vitale ===
Riva San Vitale was one of the oldest centers of the diocese of Como, to which it belonged until 1884/88. From here, Christianity spread into the Ticino. Together with the Pieves of Balerna and Uggiate (Como) in the 12th century, the parish formed a consortium. A canon priest is first mentioned in 1190, when Lafrancus de Mellano (died 1254) is called to that position. The number of resident and non-resident canons, is difficult to determine. In 1190 and 1321 two are mentioned. In 1786, Pope Pius VI dissolved the college of canons.

Originally the Pieve included Rovio, Bissone, Meriden, Tremona, Brusino, Arsizio, Rancate, Arzo, Besazio, Melano, Arogno, Maroggia and Saltrio (Varese). The Pieve was also a secular administrative unit which, in contrast to the church, included Capolago after 1416, but not Saltrio.

In 1170 it was part of the county of Seprio, and in the 13th century it was under the city of Como. At the beginning of the 15th century, it formed, together with the Pieves of Agno, Balerna and Capriasca, the Lugano Valley Community. In 1517, under Swiss Confederation rule, it became part of the bailiwick of Lugano. The Pieve of Riva San Vitale was represented both at the General Conference of the valley (which had power over financial and tax matters as well the salt supply), and in the Landschaftsrat, the valley's administrative body.

After the failed attempt on 15 February 1798 for the bailiwick of Lugano to join the Cisalpine Republic, the Pieve formed the Republic of Riva San Vitale. The Republic only existed a few weeks, from 23 February until 16 March 1798. In 1803 the Pieve of Riva San Vitale was added to the district of Lugano and divided into two sections, Ceresio and Riva San Vitale. In 1814 they became part of the district of Mendrisio.

== Geography ==
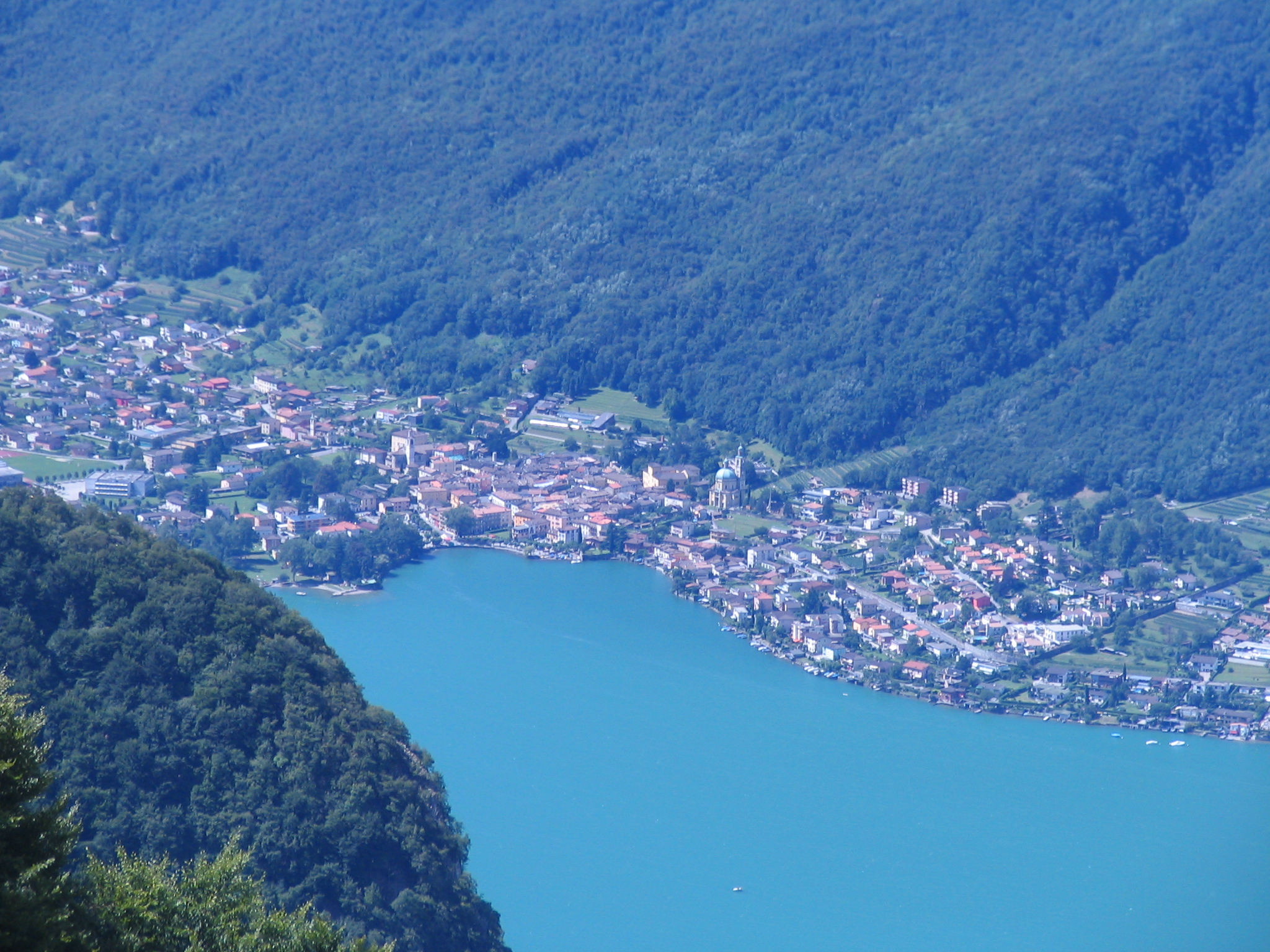
Aerial view of Riva San Vitale

Riva San Vitale has an area, as of 1997, of 5.97 square kilometers (2.31 sq mi). Of this area, 1.17 km^{2} (0.45 sq mi) or 19.6% is used for agricultural purposes, while 4.37 km^{2} (1.69 sq mi) or 73.2% is forested. Of the rest of the land, 0.88 km^{2} (0.34 sq mi) or 14.7% is settled (buildings or roads), 0.08 km^{2} (20 acres) or 1.3% is either rivers or lakes and 0.03 km^{2} (7.4 acres) or 0.5% is unproductive land.

Of the built up area, industrial buildings made up 2.3% of the total area while housing and buildings made up 9.7% and transportation infrastructure made up 1.7%. Out of the forested land, 71.2% of the total land area is heavily forested and 2.0% is covered with orchards or small clusters of trees. Of the agricultural land, 5.9% is used for growing crops, while 4.0% is used for orchards or vine crops and 9.7% is used for alpine pastures. Of the water in the municipality, 0.7% is in lakes and 0.7% is in rivers and streams.

The municipality is located in the Mendrisio district, on the southern end of Lake Lugano and at the foot of Monte San Giorgio. It consists of the village of Riva San Vitale and the hamlet of Poiana.

== Coat of arms ==
The blazon of the municipal coat of arms is Gules an arm issuant from dexter armoured argent embowed holding a sword hilted and pommed or.

== Demographics ==
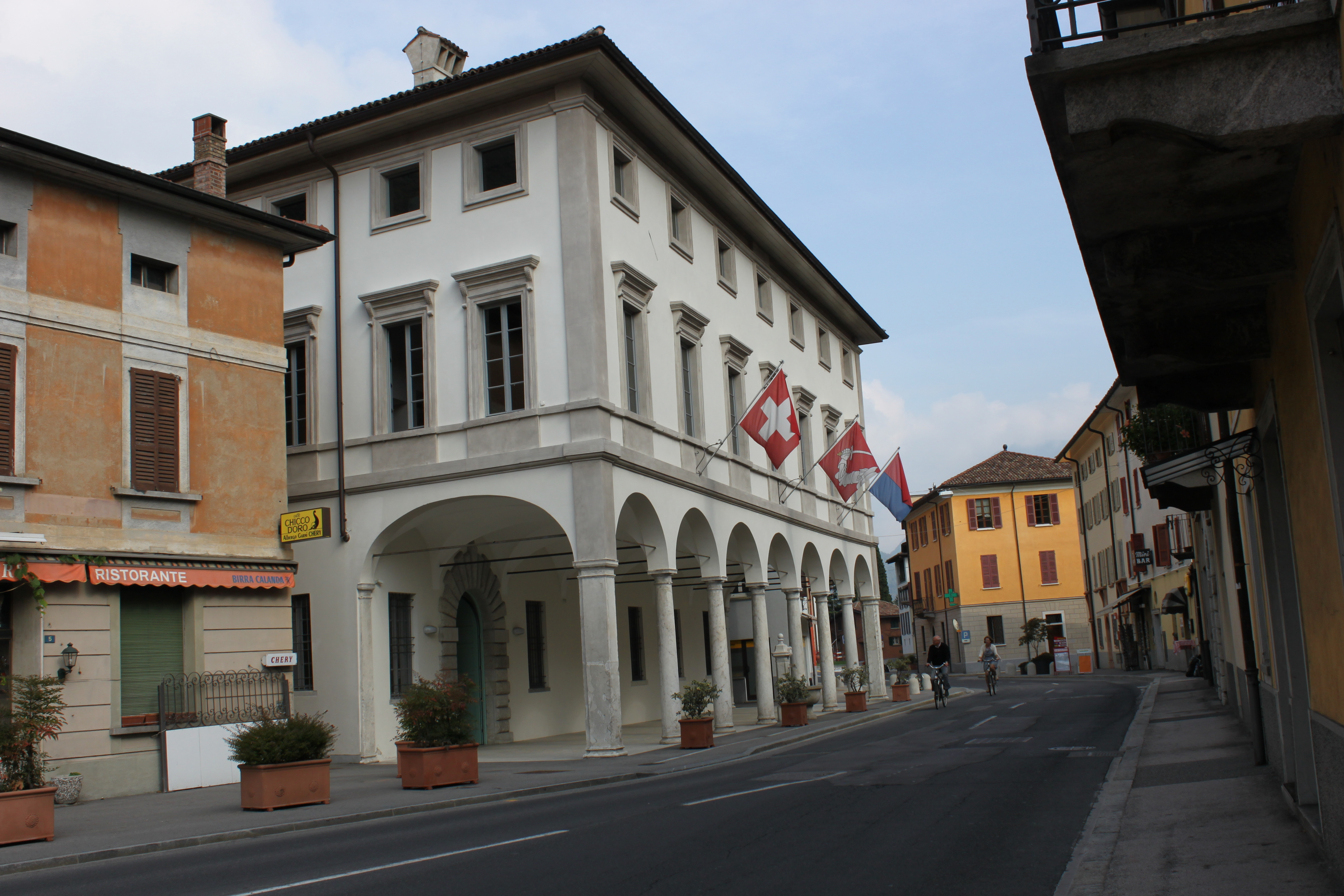
Town hall of Riva San Vitale

Riva San Vitale has a population (as of December 2020) of 2,626. As of 2008, 16.4% of the population are resident foreign nationals. Between 1997 and 2007, the population changed at a rate of 10.4%.

As of 2000, most of the population spoke Italian (2,089 or 91.1%), with German being second most common (117 or 5.1%) and French being third (24 or 1.0%). There was one person who spoke Romansh.

As of 2008, the gender distribution of the population was 48.9% male and 51.1% female. The population was made up of 1,008 Swiss men (40.5% of the population), and 210 (8.4%) non-Swiss men. There were 1,082 Swiss women (43.5%), and 190 (7.6%) non-Swiss women. Of the population in the municipality 890 or about 38.8% were born in Riva San Vitale and lived there in 2000. There were 648 or 28.3% who were born in the same canton, while 199 or 8.7% were born somewhere else in Switzerland, and 491 or 21.4% were born outside of Switzerland.

In 2008 there were 20 live births to Swiss citizens and three births to non-Swiss citizens, and in same time span there were 17 deaths of Swiss citizens and two non-Swiss citizen deaths. Ignoring immigration and emigration, the population of Swiss citizens increased by three while the foreign population increased by one. There were three Swiss men and four Swiss women who emigrated from Switzerland. At the same time, there were 12 non-Swiss men and two non-Swiss women who immigrated from another country to Switzerland. The total Swiss population change in 2008 (from all sources, including moves across municipal borders) was a decrease of one, and the non-Swiss population change was a decrease of four people. This represents a population growth rate of -0.2%.

The age distribution, as of 2009, in Riva San Vitale was 209 children or 8.4% of the population are between 0 and 9 years old and 291 teenagers or 11.7% are between 10 and 19. Of the adult population, 255 people or 10.2% of the population are between 20 and 29 years old. 319 people or 12.8% are between 30 and 39, 476 people or 19.1% are between 40 and 49, and 328 people or 13.2% are between 50 and 59. The senior population distribution is 300 people or 12.0% of the population are between 60 and 69 years old, 210 people or 8.4% are between 70 and 79, there are 102 people or 4.1% who are over 80.

As of 2000, there were 938 people who were single and never married in the municipality. There were 1,142 married individuals, 119 widows or widowers and 93 individuals who are divorced.

As of 2000, there were 924 private households in the municipality, and an average of 2.4 persons per household. There were 247 households that consist of only one person and 44 households with five or more people. Out of a total of 926 households that answered this question, 26.7% were households made up of just one person and 17 were adults who lived with their parents. Of the rest of the households, there are 230 married couples without children, 359 married couples with children There were 50 single parents with a child or children. There were 21 households that were made up unrelated people and two households that were made some sort of institution or another collective housing.

In 2000 there were 472 single family homes (or 67.5% of the total) out of a total of 699 inhabited buildings. There were 192 multi-family buildings (27.5%), along with 18 multi-purpose buildings that were mostly used for housing (2.6%) and 17 other use buildings (commercial or industrial) that also had some housing (2.4%). Of the single family homes 8 were built before 1919, while 74 were built between 1990 and 2000. The greatest number of single family homes (100) were built between 1919 and 1945.

In 2000 there were 1,137 apartments in the municipality. The most common apartment size was four rooms of which there were 361. There were 24 single room apartments and 307 apartments with five or more rooms. Of these apartments, a total of 913 apartments (80.3% of the total) were permanently occupied, while 215 apartments (18.9%) were seasonally occupied and 9 apartments (0.8%) were empty. As of 2007, the construction rate of new housing units was 3.6 new units per 1000 residents. The vacancy rate for the municipality, in 2008, was 0%.

The historical population is given in the following chart:

== Heritage sites of national significance ==
The Baptistery of S. Giovanni, the Bianchi House, the Church of S. Croce and the Palazzo della Croce are listed as Swiss heritage site of national significance. The entire town of Riva San Vitale is part of the Inventory of Swiss Heritage Sites.

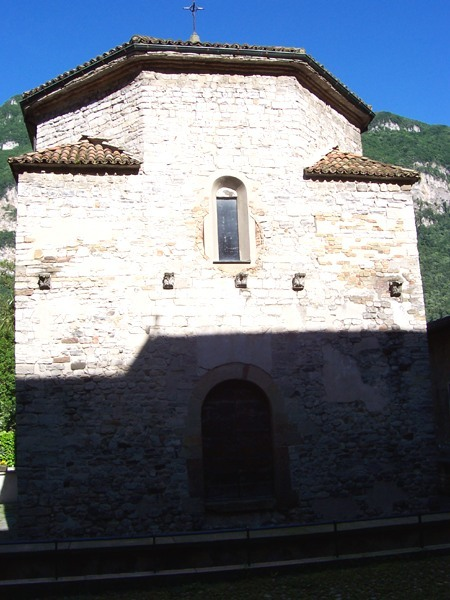
Baptistry of S. Giovanni

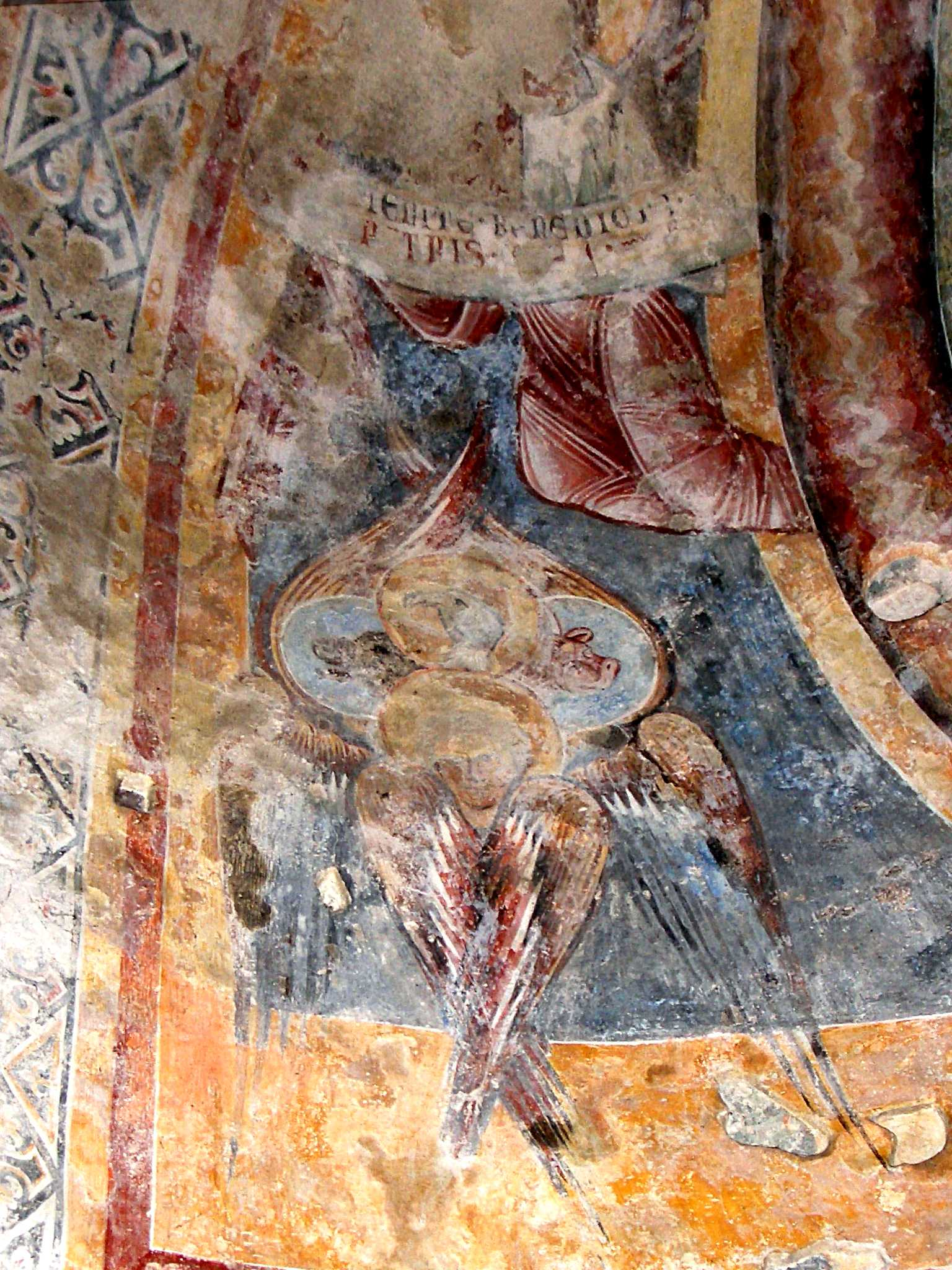
Interior of the Baptistry of S. Giovanni

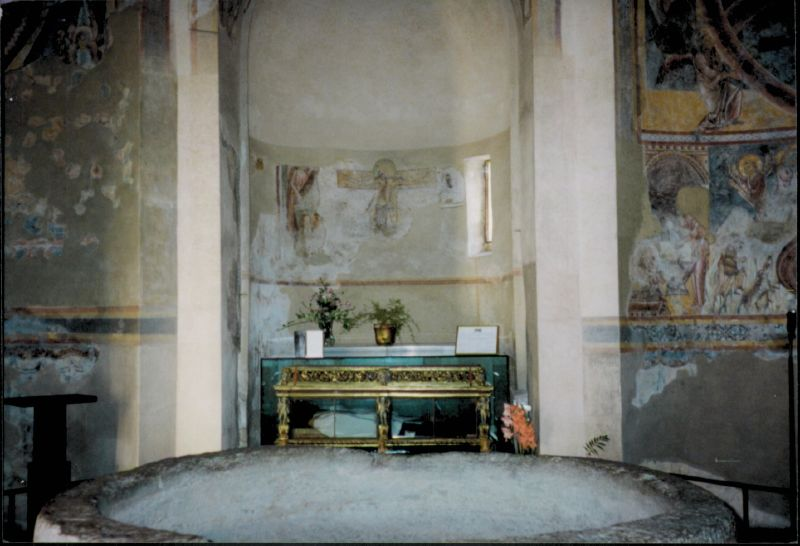
Interior of the Baptistry of S. Giovanni

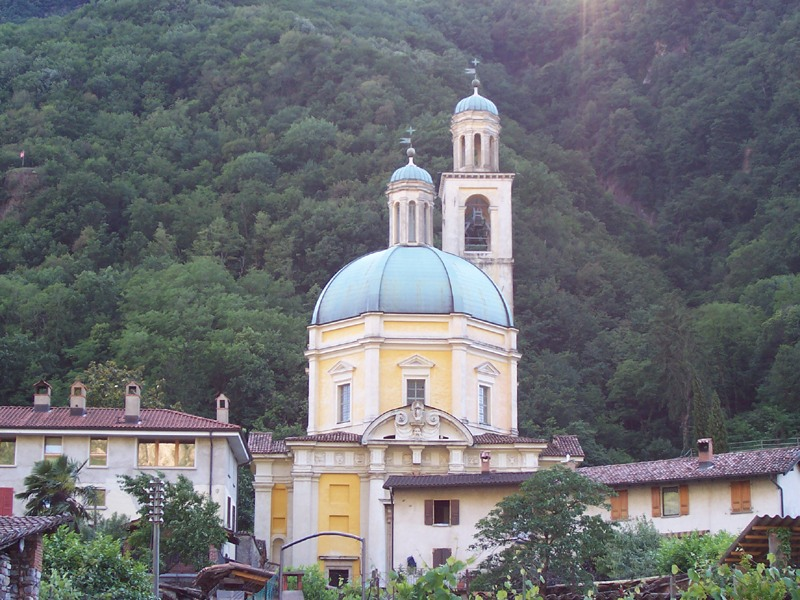
Church of S. Croce

== Politics ==
In the 2007 Gran Consiglio election, there were a total of 1,698 registered voters in Riva San Vitale, of which 1,249 or 73.6% voted. 29 blank ballots and four null ballots were cast, leaving 1,216 valid ballots in the election. The most popular party was the PPD+GenGiova which received 358 or 29.4% of the vote. The next three most popular parties were; the PLRT (with 214 or 17.6%), the LEGA (with 190 or 15.6%) and the SSI (with 189 or 15.5%).

In the 2007 Consiglio di Stato election, 19 blank ballots and seven null ballots were cast, leaving 1,223 valid ballots in the election. The most popular party was the PPD which received 366 or 29.9% of the vote. The next three most popular parties were; the LEGA (with 241 or 19.7%), the PLRT (with 205 or 16.8%) and the PS (with 186 or 15.2%).

In the 2007 federal election (National Council) the most popular party was the PPD which received 28% of the vote. The next three most popular parties were the PLRT (17%), the LEGA (15.2%) and the PS (13.5%). In the federal election, a total of 982 votes were cast, and the voter turnout was 56.1%.

In the 2011 Gran Consiglio election, there were a total of 1,802 registered voters in Riva San Vitale, of which 1,258 or 69.81% voted. 22 blank ballots and 3 null ballots were cast, leaving 1,233 valid ballots in the election. The most popular party was the PPD+GenGiova which received 304 or 24.66% of the vote. The next three most popular parties were; the LEGA (with 245 or 19.87%), the SSI (with 218 or 17.68%) and the PLRT (with 191 or 15.49%).

In the 2011 Consiglio di Stato election, 24 blank ballots and seven null ballots were cast, leaving 1,227 valid ballots in the election. The most popular party was the PPD which received 325 or 26.49% of the vote. The next three most popular parties were; the LEGA (with 316 or 25.75%), the SSI (with 185 or 15.08%) and the PLRT (with 181 or 14.75%).

In the 2011 federal election (National Council) the most popular party was the PPD which received 28.61% of the vote. The next three most popular parties were the LEGA (20.17%), the PLRT (15.52%) and the SSI (9.41%). In the federal election, a total of 1,065 votes were cast, and the voter turnout was 59.04%.

In the 2015 Gran Consiglio election, there were a total of 1,865 registered voters in Riva San Vitale, of which 1,340 or 71.85% voted. 41 blank ballots and 6 null ballots were cast, leaving 1,293 valid ballots in the election. The most popular party was the PPD+GenGiova which received 303 or 23.43% of the vote. The next three most popular parties were; the LEGA (with 302 or 23.36%), the SSI (with 235 or 18.17%) and the PLRT (with 187 or 14.46%).

In the 2015 Consiglio di Stato election, 38 blank ballots and 12 null ballots were cast, leaving 1,291 valid ballots in the election. The most popular party was the LEGA which received 349 or 27.03% of the vote. The next three most popular parties were; the PPD (with 289 or 22.39%), the SSI (with 226 or 17.51%) and the PLRT (with 181 or 14.02%).

In the 2015 federal election (National Council) the most popular party was the PPD which received 26.72% of the vote. The next three most popular parties were the LEGA (26.16%), the PLRT (13.88%) and the PS (11.99%). In the federal election, a total of 1,082 votes were cast, and the voter turnout was 58.61%.

In the 2019 Gran Consiglio election, there were a total of 1,924 registered voters in Riva San Vitale, of which 1,219 or 63.36% voted. 48 blank ballots and eight null ballots were cast, leaving 1,163 valid ballots in the election. The most popular party was the PPD+GenGiova which received 238 or 20.46% of the vote. The next three most popular parties were; the LEGA (with 235 or 20.21%), the SSI (with 231 or 19.86%) and the PLRT (with 172 or 14.79%).

In the 2019 Consiglio di Stato election, 59 blank ballots and eight null ballots were cast, leaving 1,152 valid ballots in the election. The most popular party was the LEGA which received 317 or 27.52% of the vote. The next three most popular parties were; the PPD (with 236 or 20.49%), the SSI (with 216 or 18.65%) and the PLRT (with 173 or 15.02%)

In the 2019 federal election (National Council) the most popular party was the PPD which received 24.18% of the vote. The next three most popular parties were the LEGA (17.55%), the PLRT (13.37%) and the PS (9.80%). In the federal election, a total of 1,006 votes were cast, and the voter turnout was 53.85%.

== Economy ==
As of 2007, Riva San Vitale had an unemployment rate of 3.25%. As of 2005, there were 31 people employed in the primary economic sector and about 9 businesses involved in this sector. 322 people were employed in the secondary sector and there were 43 businesses in this sector. 370 people were employed in the tertiary sector, with 72 businesses in this sector. There were 1,099 residents of the municipality who were employed in some capacity, of which females made up 39.3% of the workforce.

In 2008 the total number of full-time equivalent jobs was 656. The number of jobs in the primary sector was 32, of which 18 were in agricultureand 14 were in forestry or lumber production. The number of jobs in the secondary sector was 343, of which 214 or (62.4%) were in manufacturing and 120 (35.0%) were in construction. The number of jobs in the tertiary sector was 281. In the tertiary sector; 69 or 24.6% were in wholesale or retail sales or the repair of motor vehicles, 10 or 3.6% were in the movement and storage of goods, 30 or 10.7% were in a hotel or restaurant, 5 or 1.8% were in the information industry, 5 or 1.8% were the insurance or financial industry, 26 or 9.3% were technical professionals or scientists, 101 or 35.9% were in education and 8 or 2.8% were in health care.

In 2000, there were 843 workers who commuted into the municipality and 817 workers who commuted away. The municipality is a net importer of workers, with about 1.0 workers entering the municipality for every one leaving. About 35.1% of the workforce coming into Riva San Vitale are coming from outside Switzerland, while 0.4% of the locals commute out of Switzerland for work. Of the working population, 9.5% used public transportation to get to work, and 62.1% used a private car.

As of 2009, there was one hotel in Riva San Vitale.

== Transport ==
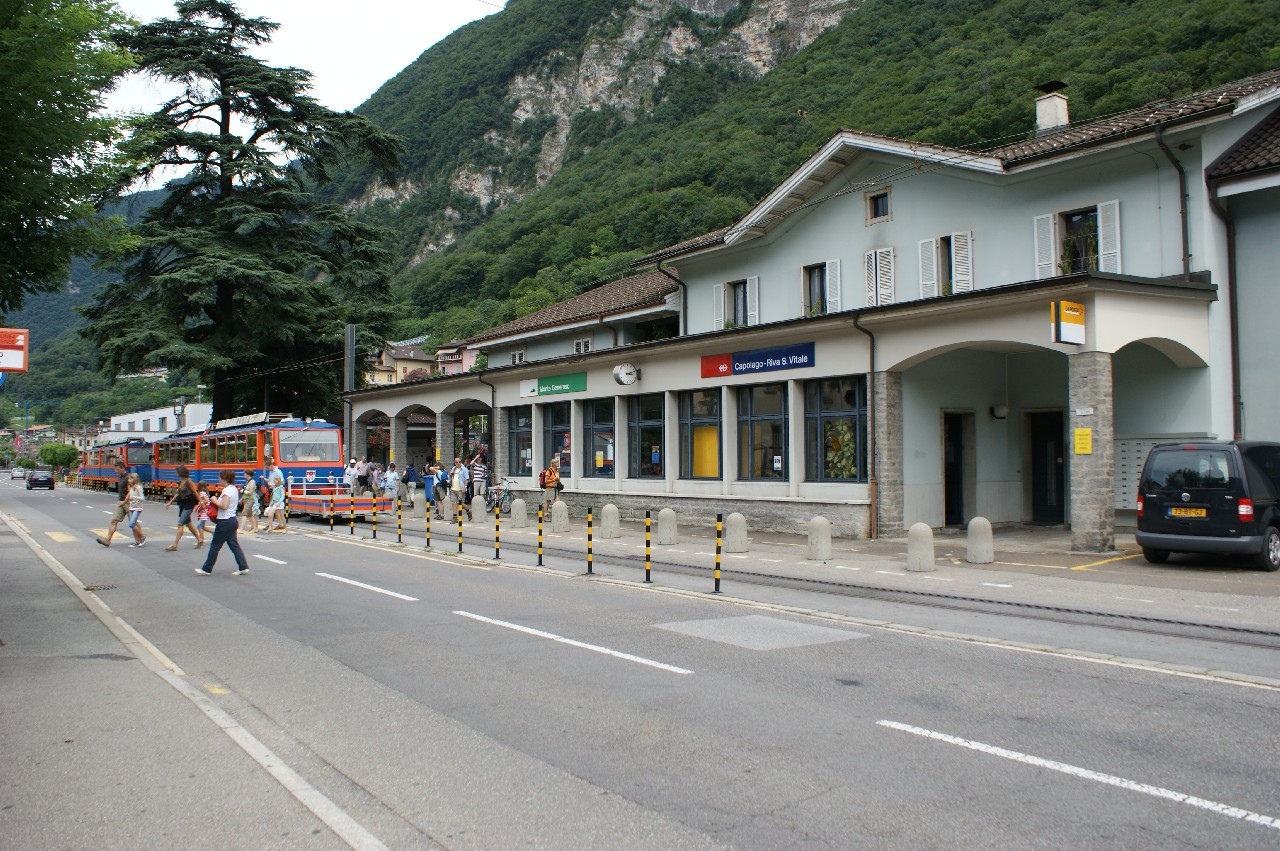
Capolago/Riva San Vitale train station

Riva San Vitale is served by the Capolago-Riva San Vitale railway station on the Gotthardbahn railway, which is situated about 1 kilometre (0.62 mi) away in the adjoining community of Capolago. Buses of the Autolinea Mendrisiense provide a link to the station, as well as services to Brusino Arsizio, Mendrisio and Porto Ceresio.

== Religion ==
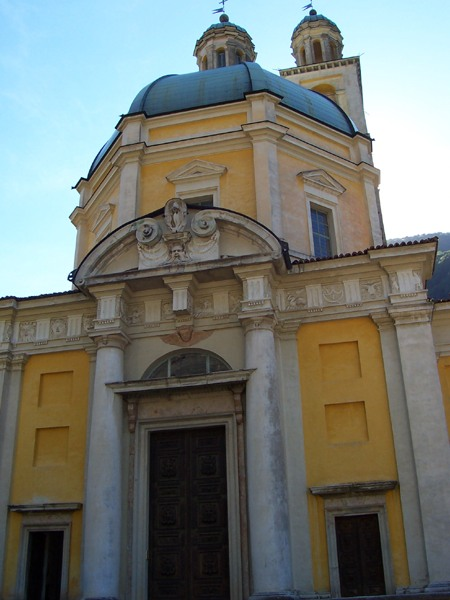
Church of S. Croce

From the 2000 census, 1,914 or 83.5% were Roman Catholic, while 86 or 3.8% belonged to the Swiss Reformed Church. Of the rest of the population, there were 7 members of an Orthodox church (or about 0.31% of the population), there were 4 individuals (or about 0.17% of the population) who belonged to the Christian Catholic Church, and there were 11 individuals (or about 0.48% of the population) who belonged to another Christian church. There were 7 (or about 0.31% of the population) who were Islamic. There were 7 individuals who were Buddhist, 14 individuals who were Hindu and 2 individuals who belonged to another church. 133 (or about 5.80% of the population) belonged to no church, are agnostic or atheist, and 107 individuals (or about 4.67% of the population) did not answer the question.

== Education ==
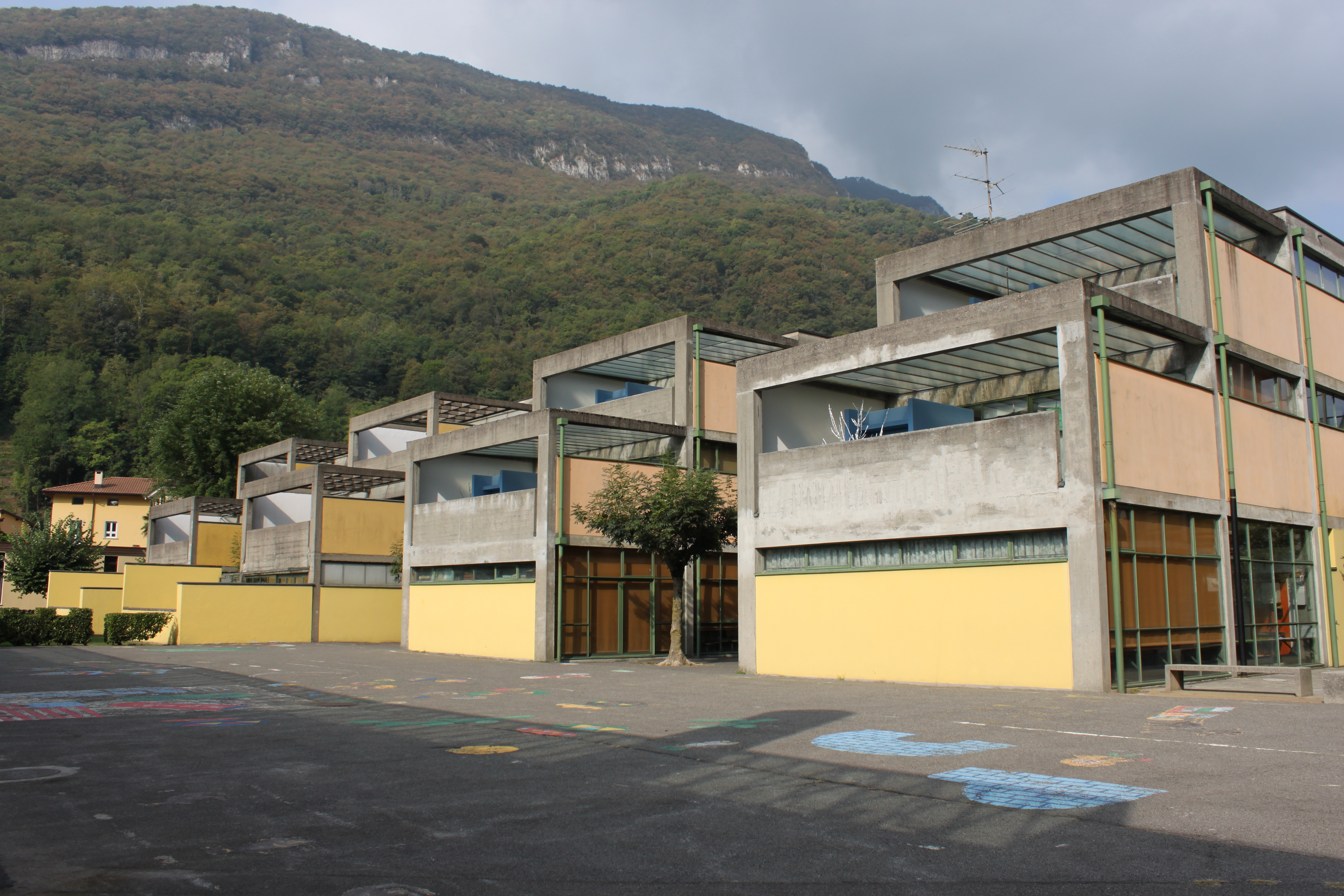
Primary school building

In Riva San Vitale about 932 or (40.7%) of the population have completed non-mandatory upper secondary education, and 231 or (10.1%) have completed additional higher education (either university or a Fachhochschule). Of the 231 who completed tertiary schooling, 51.1% were Swiss men, 30.3% were Swiss women, 13.4% were non-Swiss men and 5.2% were non-Swiss women.

In Riva San Vitale there were a total of 428 students (as of 2009). The Ticino education system provides up to three years of non-mandatory kindergarten and in Riva San Vitale there were 59 children in kindergarten. The primary school program lasts for five years and includes both a standard school and a special school. In the municipality, 117 students attended the standard primary schools and 4 students attended the special school. In the lower secondary school system, students either attend a two-year middle school followed by a two-year pre-apprenticeship or they attend a four-year program to prepare for higher education. There were 114 students in the two-year middle school and 2 in their pre-apprenticeship, while 52 students were in the four-year advanced program.

The upper secondary school includes several options, but at the end of the upper secondary program, a student will be prepared to enter a trade or to continue on to a university or college. In Ticino, vocational students may either attend school while working on their internship or apprenticeship (which takes three or four years) or may attend school followed by an internship or apprenticeship (which takes one year as a full-time student or one and a half to two years as a part-time student). There were 31 vocational students who were attending school full-time and 44 who attend part-time.

The professional program lasts three years and prepares a student for a job in engineering, nursing, computer science, business, tourism and similar fields. There were 5 students in the professional program.

As of 2000, there were 321 students in Riva San Vitale who came from another municipality, while 95 residents attended schools outside the municipality.

A branch of an American university, Virginia Tech's Steger Center for International Scholarship, is located in a historic villa in Riva San Vitale. Formerly known as the Center for European Studies and Architecture (CESA), it is Virginia Tech's European campus center and base for operations and support of its programs in the region. Housed in the 250-year-old Villa Maderni, the provides various academic programs for the undergraduate and graduate students of Virginia Tech. The main offering of the Steger Center is its semester-long student residence program. In this program, students live in the municipality, attend classes in the Villa Maderni learning facilities, and participate in field trips around Europe that complement the academic program. The university also offers summer study-abroad programs at the center.
