= Swiss Customs Museum =

Coordinates: 45.999379°N 9.020972°E

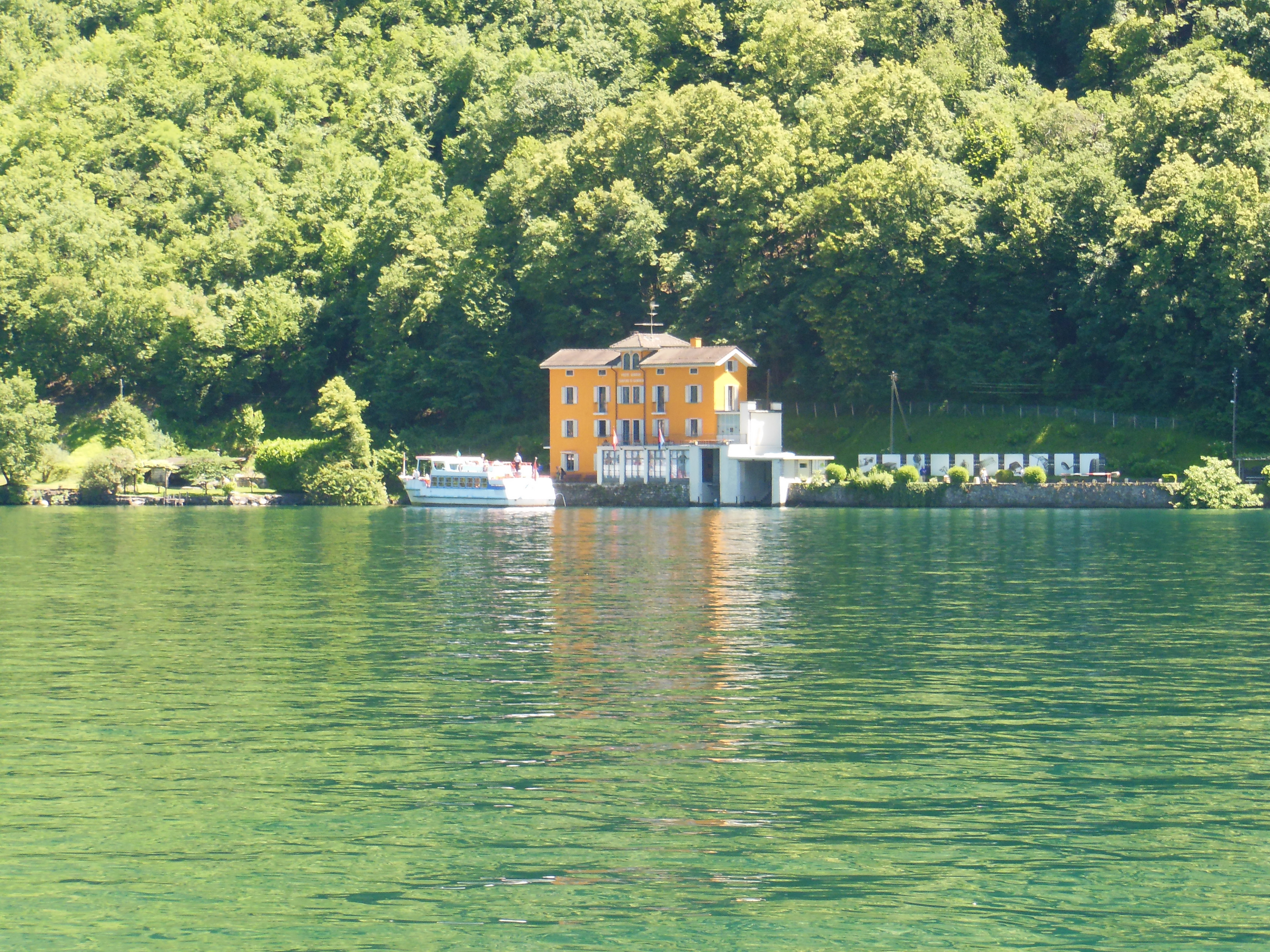
The museum as seen from Gandria village

The Swiss Customs Museum, or Museo doganale svizzero, is a museum located in the Swiss canton of Ticino. The museum is sited near Cantine di Gandria, directly across the Lake Lugano from the village of Gandria, and adjacent to the border with Italy. The museum was formerly a border post on that border, but now forms part of the Swiss National Museum.

In the 19th and 20th centuries, smuggling flourished in the mountain valleys of Ticino and Graubünden, and the museum covers the history of this, and the work of customs officers to counteract it. In a modern context, it covers the work of the Swiss Federal Customs Administration and the Swiss Border Guard.

The museum has no road access, and is best reached by boat. Boats of the Società Navigazione del Lago di Lugano (SNL) provide several crossings a day to Lugano.

== See also ==
- List of museums in Ticino
- List of museums in Switzerland
