= Caprino =

Caprino may refer to:

- Caprino cheese, a type of Italian goat cheeses

In places:

- Caprino Bergamasco, a municipality in the Italian region of Lombardy
- Caprino Veronese, a municipality in the Italian region Veneto
- Caprino, Switzerland, a quarter of the city Lugano

In persons:

- Ivo Caprino (1920–2001), Norwegian film director
