= Società Navigazione del Lago di Lugano =

Swiss public transport operator

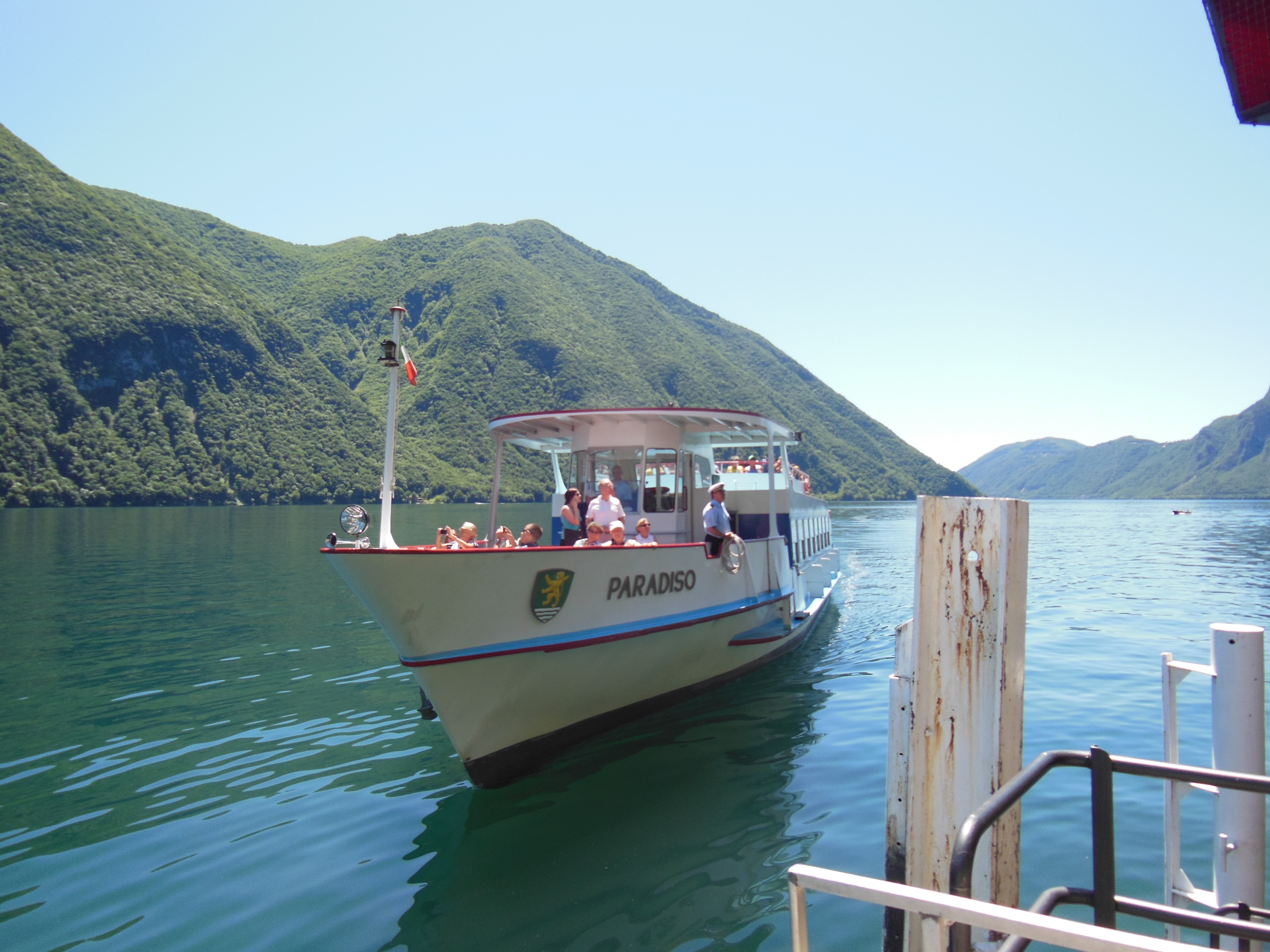
- SNL MV Paradiso arriving at Gandria.
- Industry: Transport
- Founded: 1873 (current name: 1919)
- Headquarters: Lugano, Switzerland
- Area served: Lake Lugano
- Website: lakelugano.ch

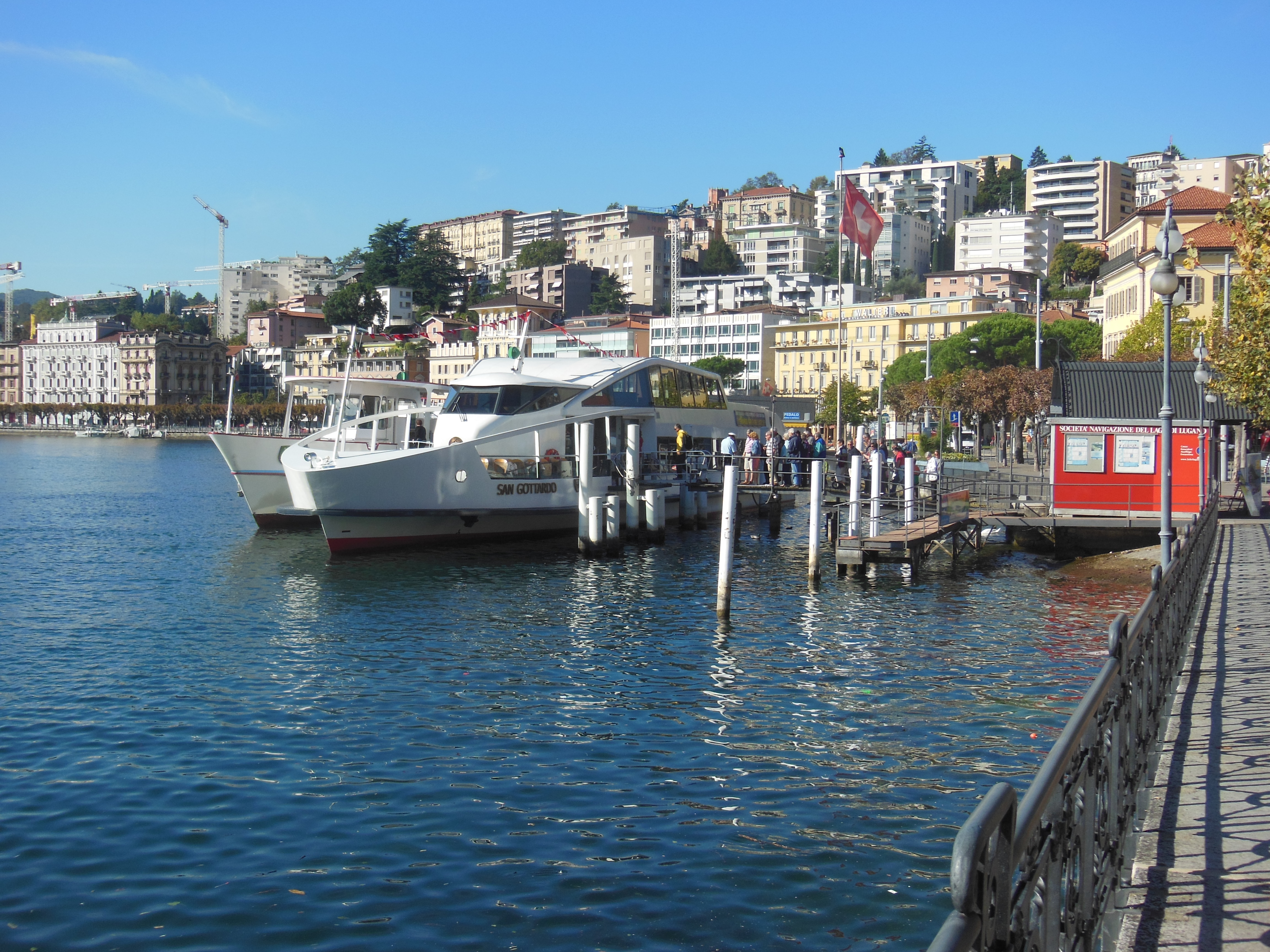
Two of SNL's boats, alongside the Lugano Giardino landing stage in central Lugano.

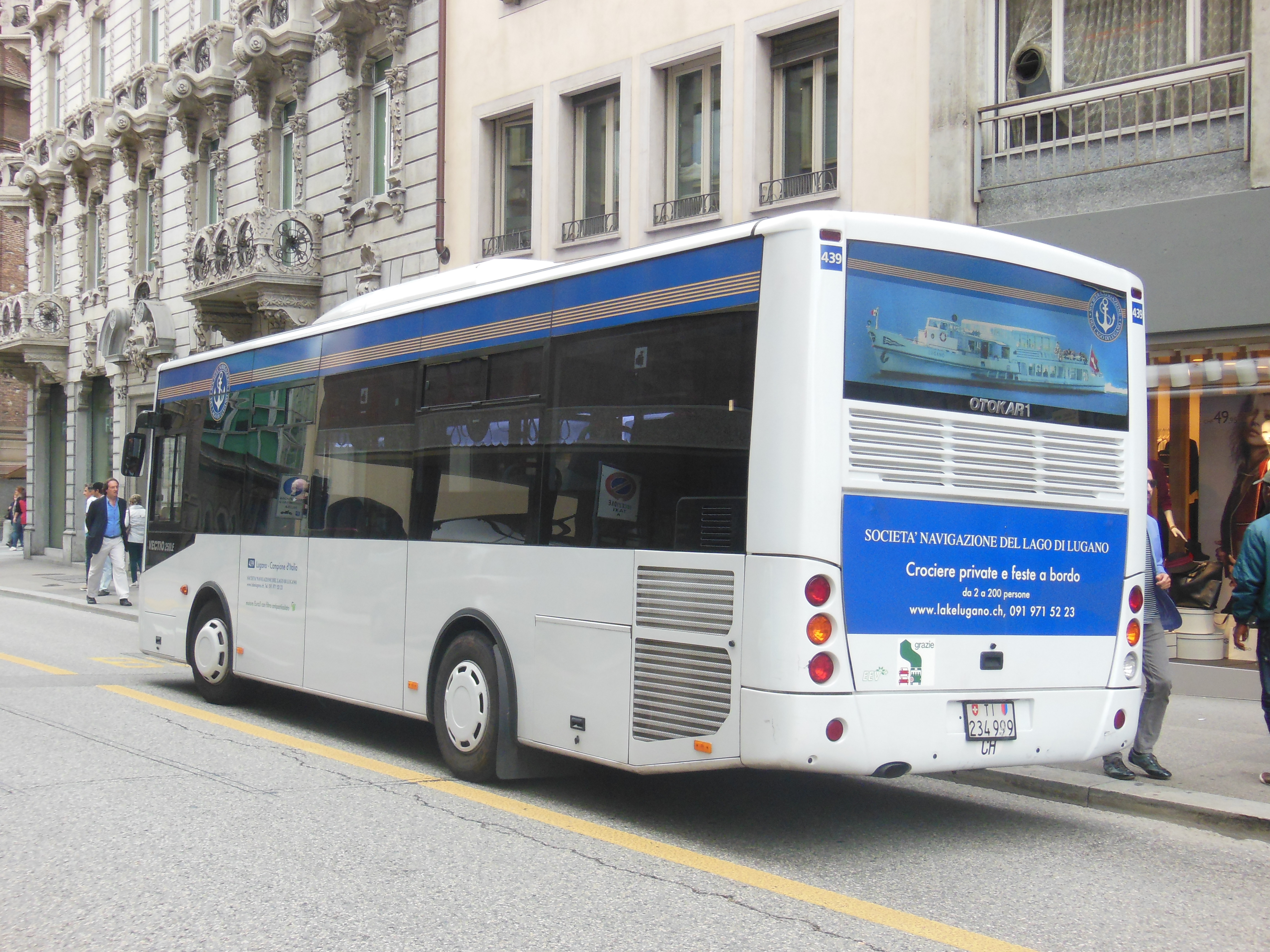
One of SNL's buses, in central Lugano.

The Società Navigazione del Lago di Lugano or Lake Lugano Navigation Company (SNL) is a Swiss company operating passenger services on Lake Lugano. The company also operates bus routes in the same area, and is based at Cassarate in the city of Lugano. It was formerly known as the Società di Navigazione e Ferrovie per lago di Lugano and at one time also operated railways in the area.

The passenger boats of the SNL principally provide services for tourist purposes, but they also connect Lugano with other lake-side communities, in both Switzerland and Italy, some of which have no road access. The bus services connect Lugano with Gandria and Campione d'Italia, both of which are also served by boat services.

SNL is a member of the arcobaleno tariff network, but only accepts arcobaleno tickets on its bus services and not on boat services. It also grants a 40% discount on all its fares to holders of arcobaleno season tickets.

== History ==
The Società di Navigazione e Ferrovie per lago di Lugano (SNF) was formed in 1873 to construct and operate a transport link from Menaggio, on Lake Como, to Luino, on Lake Maggiore, via Lugano. Although both ends of this link were in Italy, the company was created with Swiss finance, and registered in Lugano.

Previous plans were to build a railway throughout, but difficulties in financing the proposal and the substantial engineering works that would be required, led to the revised plan which was eventually implemented. This involved the construction of two unconnected railways, both entirely located within Italy. The Menaggio–Porlezza railway and the Ponte Tresa–Luino railway were linked by the use of steamboats, between Porlezza and Ponte Tresa on Lake Lugano, to form the desired through route.

The outbreak of World War I lead to a considerable loss of traffic and financial problems, and the SNF decided to sell its railways and concentrate on operating its steamboat services on Lake Lugano. The lines were sold to the Società Varesina per le Imprese Elettriche (SVIE) in 1919. After the sale, the company changed its name to the Società Navigazione del Lago di Lugano.

By 1926, the company was operating nine passenger steamboats on Lake Lugano, including six paddle steamers and three screw steamers, together with two cargo motor vessels. In 1927, the passenger motor vessel Lugano was introduced, and this vessel is still in service, having been renamed Milano in 1961. The last paddle steamers in the fleet were retired in 1962.

In 1908, the shipping company Vedetta SA was formed by a group of Lugano hoteliers. They ordered five steel-hulled launches from Theodore Hitzler of Hamburg. The boats served various locations around Lugano bay. The company was merged into the SNL in 1944, and their earliest vessel, the Vedetta, is still owned by the SNL.

== Fleet ==
The SNL operates a fleet of 11 motor vessels of various ages and sizes:

Name	Built in	Passengers + Crew	Length	Width	Max Speed	Notes	Image
SNL.1	1905	0+2	18.60 m (61.0 ft)	4.05 m (13.3 ft)	12.0 km/h (7.5 mph)	Work boat	
Vedetta	1908	40+1	11.00 m (36.09 ft)	2.68 m (8 ft 10 in)	12.0 km/h (7.5 mph)		
Milano	1927	150+2	32.00 m (104.99 ft)	6.60 m (21.7 ft)	20.0 km/h (12.4 mph)	Named Lugano until 1961	
Ceresio	1931	240+2	31.35 m (102.9 ft)	6.28 m (20.6 ft)	21.8 km/h (13.5 mph)	Named after an alternative name for Lake Lugano	
Lugano	1961	300+2	47.25 m (155.0 ft)	9.10 m (29.9 ft)	27.0 km/h (16.8 mph)		
Italia	1962	300+2	47.10 m (154.5 ft)	9.10 m (29.9 ft)	25.7 km/h (16.0 mph)	Built by Bodan-Werft GmbH of Kressbronn	
Morcote	1977	220+2	28.26 m (92.7 ft)	6.00 m (19.69 ft)	21.0 km/h (13.0 mph)		
Paradiso	1978	220+2	28.26 m (92.7 ft)	6.00 m (19.69 ft)	19.8 km/h (12.3 mph)		
San Lorenzo	1987	60+1	17.20 m (56.4 ft)	4.35 m (14.3 ft)	18.7 km/h (11.6 mph)		
Sant’Ambrogio	1988	60+1	18.00 m (59.06 ft)	4.35 m (14.3 ft)	18.5 km/h (11.5 mph)		
San Gottardo	2001	300+2	41.80 m (137.1 ft)	7.80 m (25.6 ft)	25.6 km/h (15.9 mph)		

The company also operates a fleet of buses used on its bus services.

The Ticino, a near sister ship to the Lugano and Italia, now serves as the Lord Nelson Pub, permanently moored on the lake in Porto Ceresio.

== Routes ==
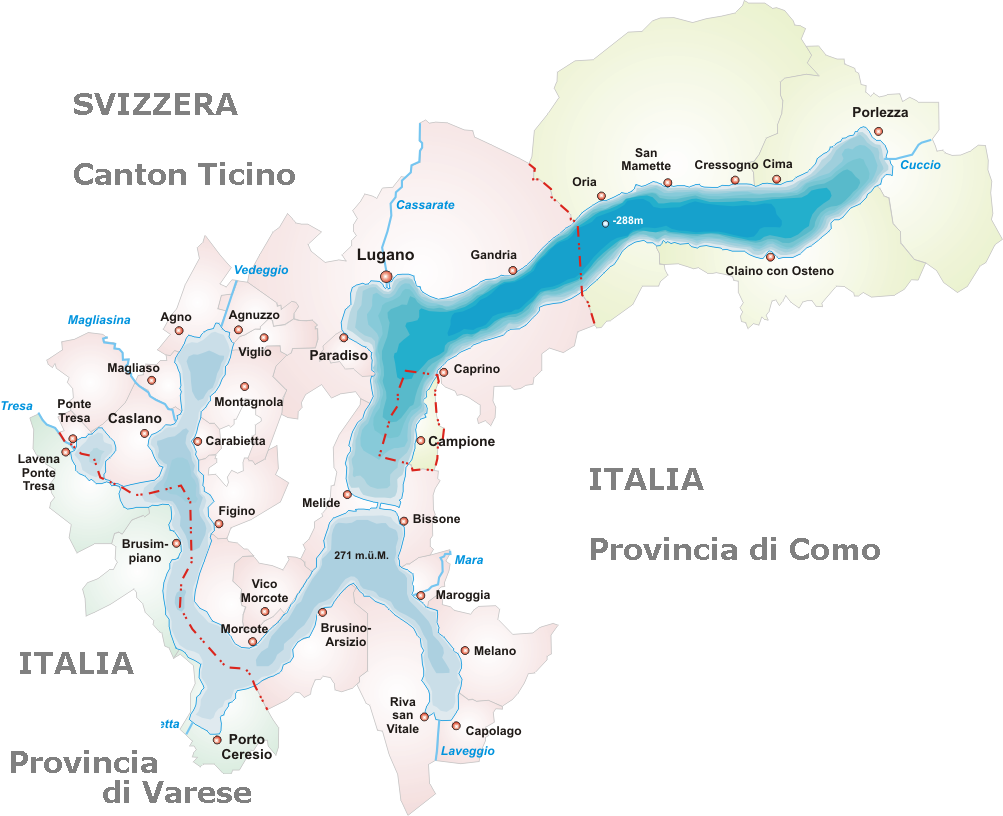

The SNL operates several routes, both bus and boat. The following places are served, listed here in clockwise order around the lake shore from Lugano:

- Lugano (CH)
- Cassarate (CH)
- Museo Heleneum (CH)
- Grotto Elvezia (CH)
- Gandria (CH)
- Oria (I)
- San Mamete (I)
- Porlezza (I)
- Osteno (I)
- Museo Doganale (CH)
- Cantine di Gandria (CH)
- Grotto Pescatori (CH)
- Cantine di Caprino (CH)
- Caprino (CH)
- Campione d'Italia (I)
- Bissone (CH)
- Capolago (CH)
- Brusino Arsizio (CH)
- Porto Ceresio (I)
- Ponte Tresa (I)
- Ponte Tresa (CH)
- Caslano (CH)
- Figino (CH)
- Morcote (CH)
- Melide (CH)
- Paradiso (CH)

Not all services serve all stops, nor are they necessarily served in the order presented above.

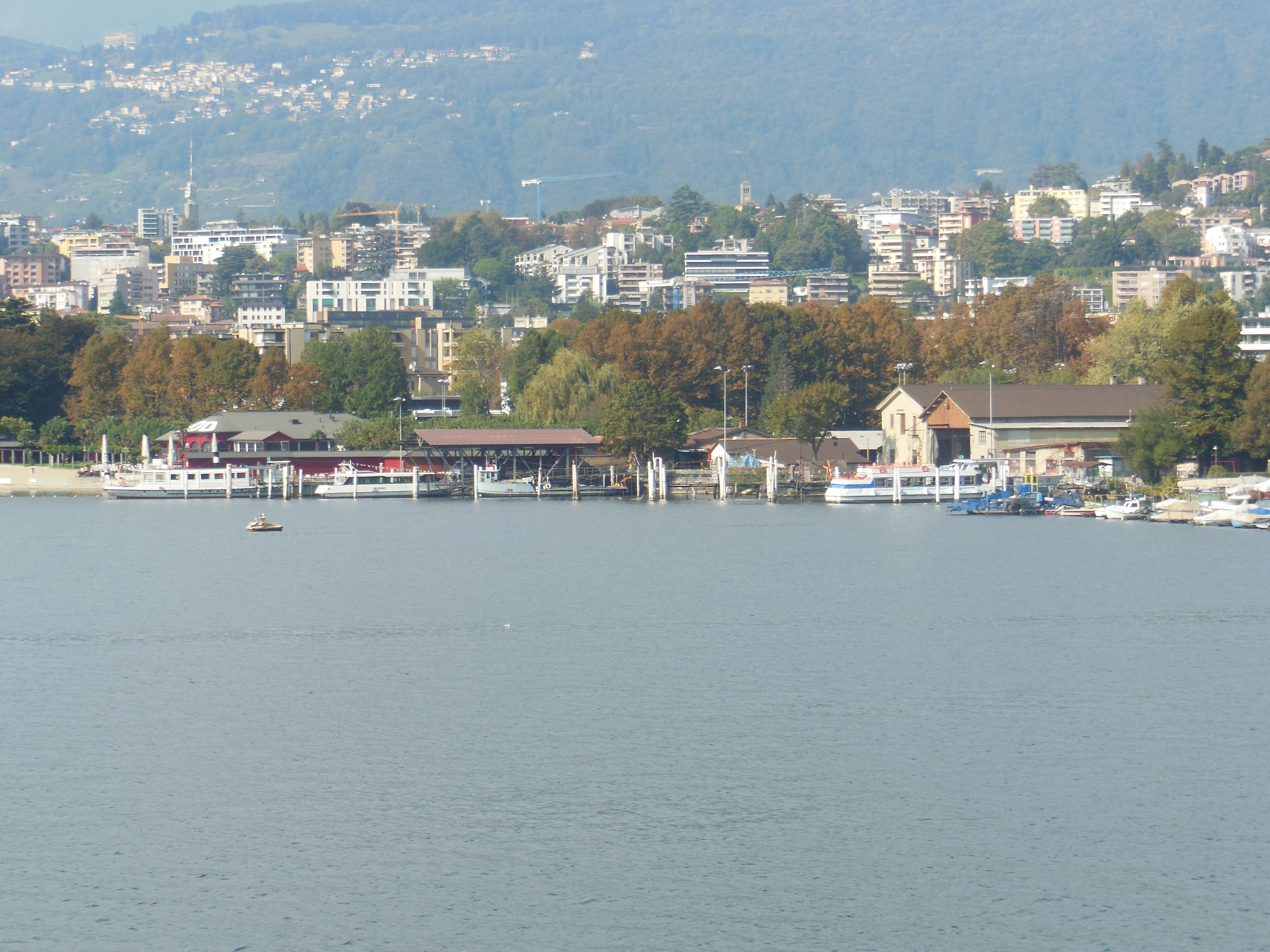
The SNL shipyard at Cassarate.

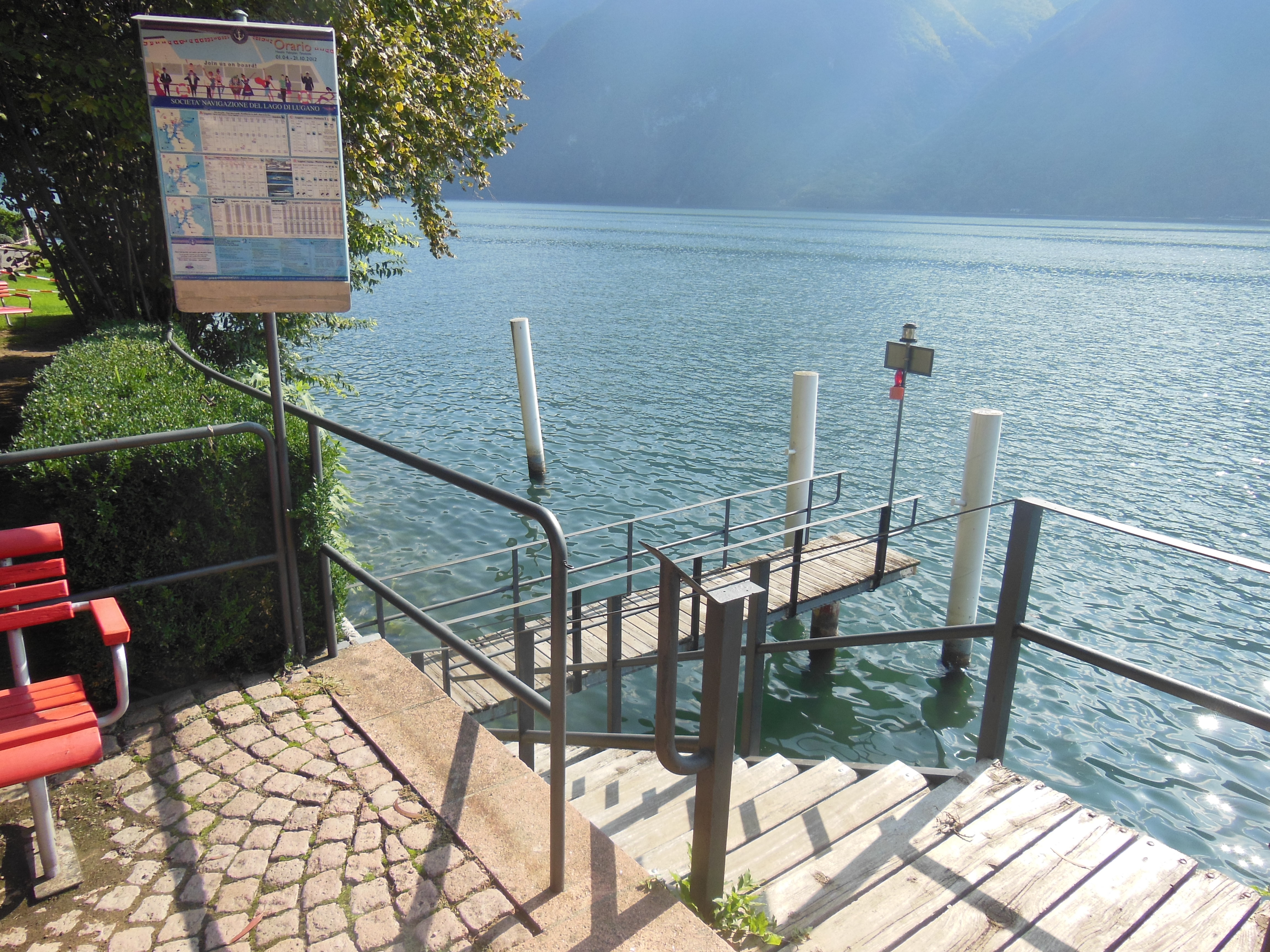
The SNL landing stage at the Museo Heleneum.

== See also ==
- Transport in Switzerland
