= Liechtenstein Border Guard =

Historical defence unit

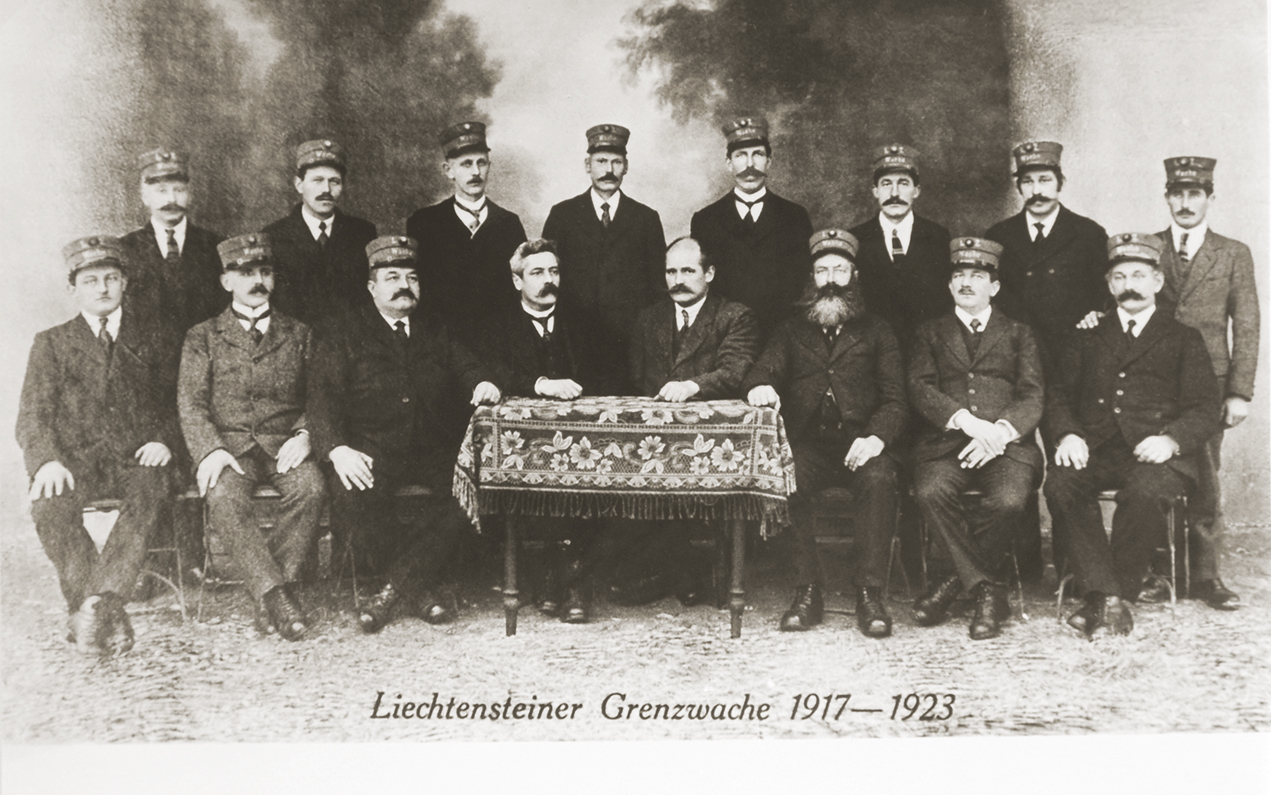
Borderguards

Liechtenstein Border Guard (German: Liechtensteiner Grenzwache) was Liechtenstein's border guard, founded in 1919. It was founded following the end of Austria-Hungary which previously provided its Border Police to the Principality. The border guard disbanded in 1923, when Liechtenstein signed a customs union treaty with Switzerland and gave to the Swiss Border Guard this duty.
