= List of museums in Ticino =

This is a list of museums in Ticino, Switzerland.

Name	Image	City	Area of study	Active dates	Notes
MASI Lugano		Lugano	Art	2015–present	also known as Museo d'arte della Svizzera italiana.
Museum of Cultures (Lugano)		Castagnola	Ethnography		
Museo d'Arte moderna di Lugano		Lugano	Art	?–2015	also known as Museum of Modern Art, Lugano or Villa Malpensata
Museo Cantonale di Arte di Lugano		Lugano	Art	1987–2015	
Museo Civico di Belle Arti di Lugano		Lugano	Art		
Museo Cantonale di storia naturale di Lugano		Lugano	Natural history		
Museo Storico Villa Saroli		Lugano	History		
Museo di Santa Maria degli Angeli		Lugano			
Fondazione Galleria Gottardo		Lugano			
Museo del Malcantone		Curio	Ethnography		
Villa Ciani		Lugano	Art		
Museo Laboratorio Kunsthalle Lugano		Lugano	Art		
Museo Wilhelm Schmid		Brè sopra Lugano	Art		
Museo Mario Bernasconi		Pazzallo	Art		
Fondazione d'arte Erich Lindenberg		Porza	Art		
Casa-Museo Luigi Rossi		Tesserete	Art		
Museo del Bigorio		Bigorio	History		
Swiss Customs Museum		Gandria	History		also known as Museo delle dogane svizzere or Museo doganale svizzero
Archivio Storico Città di Lugano		Lugano-Castagnola	History		
Museo San Salvatore		Lugano-Paradiso	History		
Museo Hermann Hesse		Montagnola	History		
Museo d'Arte Sacra di Breno		Breno	History		
Fondazione Vincenzo Vicari		Caslano	History		
Museo della Miniera d'Oro		Sessa	History		
Piccolo Museo di Sessa e Monteggio		Sessa	History		
Swissminiatur		Melide			
Museo della Radio di Rivera		Rivera			
Museo del Cioccolato Alprose		Caslano	Food	1991–present	
Museo della Pesca di Caslano		Caslano			
Museo della Grappa c/o Tenuta Tamborini		Castelrotto			
Museo Ferrovie Luganesi / Museo della ferrovia FLP - Ponte Tresa		Ponte Tresa			
Museo Villa dei Cedri		Bellinzona	Art		
Casa Pessina		Ligornetto	Art		
Centro Culturale e museo Elisarion		Minusio	Art		
m.a.x. museo		Chiasso	Art		
Museo Casa del Padre di Orselina		Orselina	Art		
Museo civico e archeologico Stabile Casorella e Castello Visconteo		Locarno	Art		
Museo comunale d'arte moderna di Ascona		Ascona	Art		
Museo di San Sebastiano di Ascona		Ascona	Art		
Museo d'arte città di Mendrisio		Mendrisio	Art		
Museo d'Arte Sacra della Parrocchia di Meride		Meride	Art		
Museo Epper		Ascona	Art		
Museo Fiorenzo Abbondio		Minusio	Art		
Museo in Erba		Bellinzona	Art		
Museo La Congiunta		Giornico	Art		
Museo parrocchiale Campione d'Italia		Campione d'Italia	Art		
Museo parrocchiale Morbio Inferiore		Morbio Inferiore	Art		
Museo Rainis e Aspazija		Castagnola	Art		
Museo Sergio Maina		Caslano	Art		
Museo Villa Pia		Porza	Art		
Museo Vincenzo Vela		Ligornetto	Art		
Pinacoteca Cantonale Giovanni Züst		Rancate	Art		
Spazio Espositivo Collezione Giancarlo e Danna Olgiati		Lugano	Art		
Cà da Rivöi		Olivone	Ethnography		
Casa Besta		Brusio	Ethnography		
Museo C'era una volta		Riva San Vitale	Ethnography		
Museo della civiltà contadina del Mendrisiotto		Stabio	Ethnography		
Museo della Memoria		Giubiasco	Ethnography, history		
Museo della Valle di Blenio		Lottigna	Ethnography		
Museo di civiltà contadina c/o Obaldi Bruno		Camorino	Ethnography		
Museo di Leventina		Giornico	Ethnography		
Museo di Val Verzasca		Sonogno	Ethnography		
Museo di Valmaggia		Cevio	Ethnography		
Museo etnografico della Valle di Muggio		Cabbio	Ethnography		
Museo Odro		Vogorno	Ethnography		
Museo Onsernonese		Loco	Ethnography		
Museo regionale delle Centovalli e del Pedemonte		Intragna	Ethnography		
Museo Walserhaus Gurin		Bosco/Gurin	Ethnography		
Piccolo Museo di Sessa		Sessa	Ethnography		
Fondazione Museo della Storia Medica Ticinese		Cadenazzo	History of medicine and surgery		
Museo Fossili e Minerali		Semione	Natural history		
Casa Cavalier Pellanda		Biasca	History		
Museo Castello di Sasso Corbaro		Bellinzona - Artore	History		
Museo civico Castello di Montebello		Bellinzona	History		
Museo civico e archeologico		Locarno	History		
Museo del Dazio Grande		Rodi-Fiesso	History		
Museo di Castelgrande		Bellinzona	History		
Museo di S. Maria degli Angioli		Lugano	History		
Museo di San Martino		Olivone	History		
Museo Forte Airolo		Airolo	History		
Museo Forte Mondascia Biasca		Biasca	History		
Museo Forte Ospizio		Airolo - San Gottardo	History		
Museo Monte Verità		Ascona	History		
Museo Nazionale del S. Gottardo		Airolo	History		
Museo Plebano		Agno	History		
Esposizione veicoli d'epoca		Pregassona			
Fondazione Rolf Gérard		Ascona			
Galleria Baumgartner		Mendrisio			
Memorial Room Clay Regazzoni		Pregassona			
Museo Comico		Verscio			
Museo del Caffè		Balerna			
Museo del cioccolato c/o Cima Norma		Dangio-Torre			
Museo del vino		Tenero			
Museo della fotografia di Caslano c/o Municipio di Caslano		Caslano			
Museo di speleologia San Salvatore		Lugano - Paradiso			
Museo Leoncavallo Fondazione R. Leoncavallo		Brissago		2002–present	in the Municipio di Brissago
Piccolo museo della scatola di latta		Brione sopra Minusio			
Piccolo museo delle scatole di latta di Franco Grassi		Aquila			
Sasso San Gottardo		Airolo - Passo del Gottardo			
Fondazione Archivio Donetta		Corzoneso			
Museo del manifesto ticinese		Morcote			

== Other relevant institutions ==
- Association for the preservation of the artistic and architectural heritage in Vallemaggia
- Association Landscape Bosco Guin
- Association of the ethnographic museums of Ticino
- Association of friends of the museums of Ticino
- Centre Nature Vallemaggia
- Centre of dialectology and ethnography
- Foundation Val Bavona
- Foundation Verzasca
- International Association for Alpine History (IAAH)
- Society of Ticino for art and nature

== See also ==
- List of museums in Switzerland
