= Gandria =

Coordinates: 46°00′N 9°00′E

- Quarter
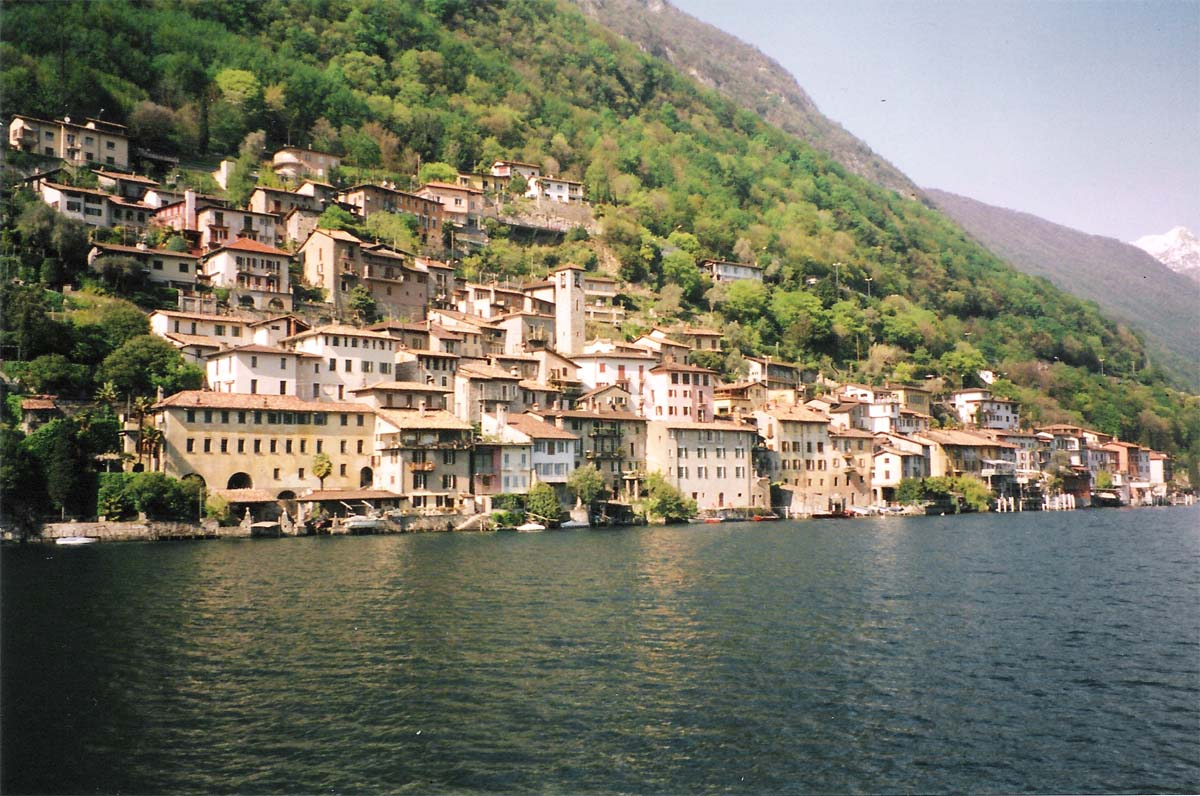
- Gandria from Lake Lugano

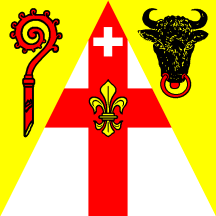
- Flag Coat of arms

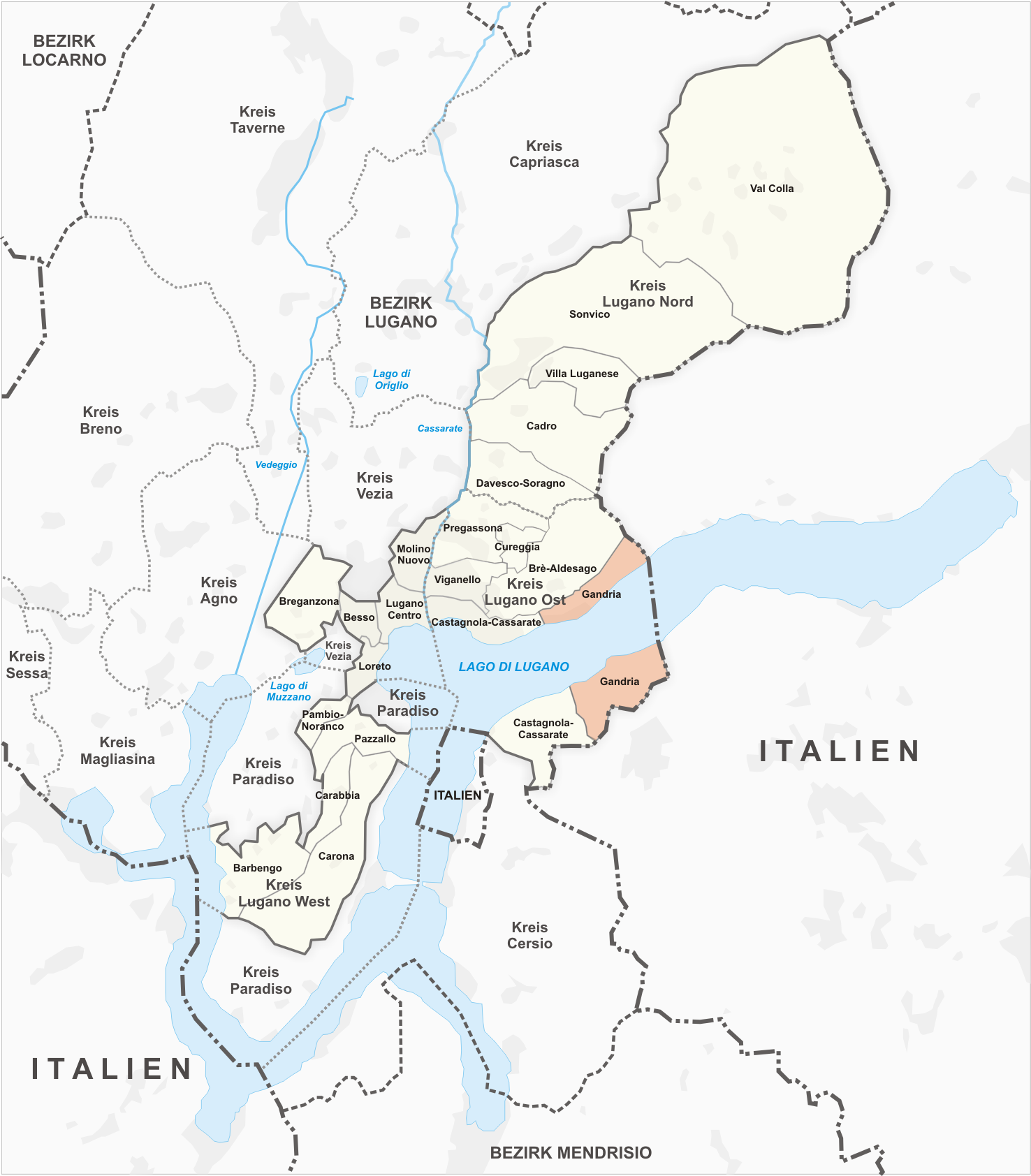
- Country: Switzerland
- Canton: Ticino
- District: Lugano
- City: Lugano

Area
  - Total: 3.45 km^{2} (1.33 sq mi)

Population (2012-12-31)
  - Total: 275
  - Density: 79.7/km^{2} (206/sq mi)

Gandria is both a quarter of the city of Lugano in the Swiss canton of Ticino, and a village on the northern shore of Lake Lugano, which forms the core of that quarter. Until 2004, the quarter of Gandria was an independent municipality, joining with Lugano in that year.

The quarter of Gandria includes the rural slopes surrounding the village and stretching along the lakeside from the neighboring quarter of Castagnola-Cassarate to the border with Italy. It also includes the slopes on the opposite, (southern) side of the lake around the small settlement of Cantine di Gandria, that are accessible only by boat or on foot.

The historically protected center of the village of Gandria, which is also not accessible by car, attracts visitors from all over the world. While roads now reach the outskirts of the village, many of these visitors arrive by boat services on the lake. It is also possible to walk from Lugano to Gandria and back to Lugano via a footpath, now branded the Olive path, which passes plantations of olive trees and offers views of the Lake of Lugano.

== History ==
=== Early history ===
The first lasting human traces on the immediate area around Gandria come from the iron-age people of the Celts (as of 550 B.C.). A large stone (Sasso della Predescia) carved with mysterious signs, probably used for Celtic religious purposes, is located within hiking distance. Many modern locations nearby have Celtic names. Gandria sits at the base of Mt. Brè, which means “mountain” in Celtic. The name of the Lake of Lugano in Italian, Ceresio, could be derived from the Celtic word keresios, a reference to a god of fertility who is always pictured with the antlers of a deer – the lake’s resemblance to the prongs of an antler can be more easily imagined when viewed from above.

Rome conquered the region in 196 B.C. Tombs and artifacts from the neighbouring villages of Castagnola and Brè are testimonials to the Roman presence. Present-day Gandria, however, was not yet inhabited.

=== First settlement ===
“Gandrio” is first mentioned in archives from the bishop of Como in 1237. At the time, the village was located halfway up Mt. Brè – the ruins are still visible today along the trail to the Sasso della Predescia.

In the 14th century, a new settlement was established along the lake in the present-day site. Eventually the upper part of the village was abandoned, perhaps due to fire, perhaps due to the advantages of living near the lake. Gandria was only accessible by boat and steep trails, locals had to be self-sufficient. In addition to gardening and raising livestock, they benefited from the lake’s abundant fish.

=== Olives, silk and smuggling ===
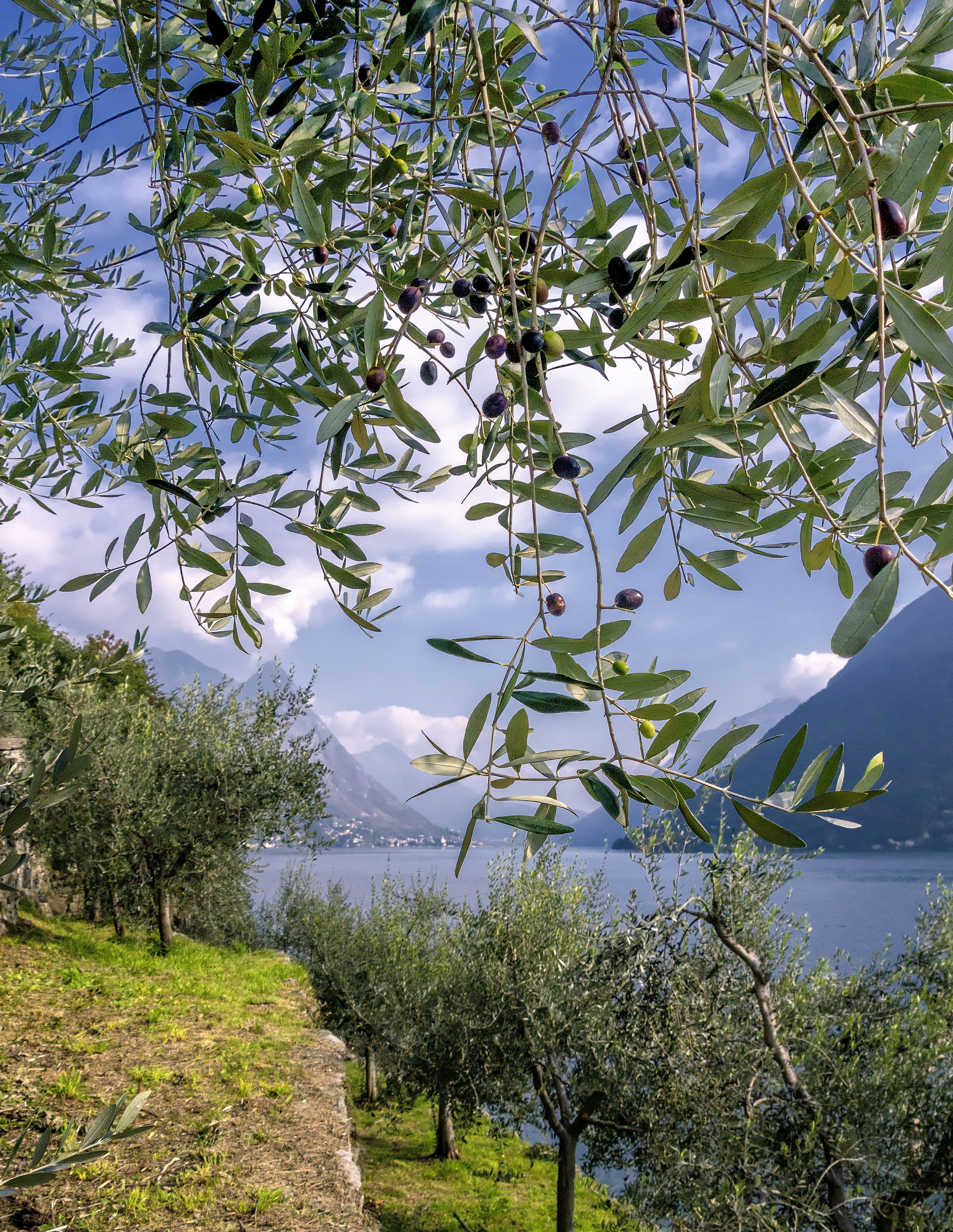
Olive cultivation in Gandria

Until the unusually hard winter of 1709 killed most of the olive trees, Gandria was known for its olive oil. In recent years, olive trees have been replanted and information panels posted along a scenic lakeside trail to Lugano (Sentiero dell’olivo).

In 1856 silk production began in Gandria, using leaves from local mulberry trees to feed the silkworms. Because of the difficult-to-control border, the area around Gandria became infamous for smuggling. Cigarettes, meat and alcohol were especially profitable due to high Swiss customs duties. (A notable item at the Swiss Customs Museum is a confiscated “submarine” used to smuggle salami).

The year 1935 was the beginning of a new era for Gandria, as tunnels and a new road above the lake shore connected the village to Lugano and Italy.

=== Merger with Lugano ===
In 2004, the municipality of Gandria merged with the city of Lugano. Since Gandria became a part of Lugano, needed infrastructure projects have been carried out, including a sewage treatment plant that went on line in August 2010. Work to place electrical lines underground is ongoing.

== Sights ==
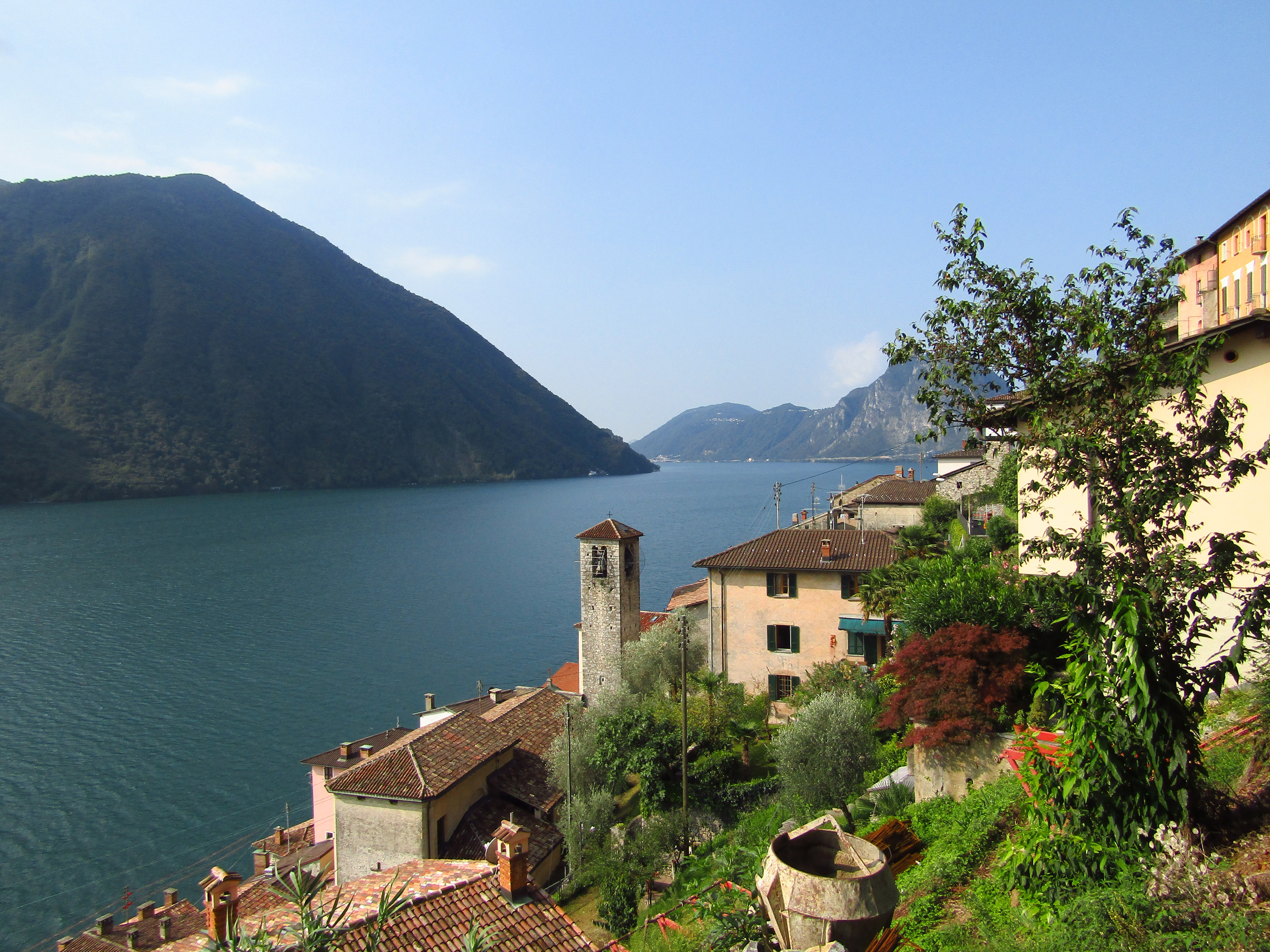
Gandria from above with the Church of Saint Vigilio

=== Church of Saint Vigilio ===
The Church of Saint Vigilio in Gandria was completed in 1463. The oldest part is the gray, unfinished wall facing the lake, adorned with memorials from well-known local families. The baroque facades were completed in the 1870s. Behind the altar of the church is a large oil painting by Giovanni and Giuseppe Torricelli that shows the martyrdom of Saint Vigilio, a bishop of Trento in Italy, who was stoned to death by pagan shepherds.

The connection with Gandria comes from local artisans who worked on the construction of the cathedral in Trento, and were presumably impressed by the patron saint. The Torricelli brothers also painted scenes in the house of local architect Vigilio Rabaglio, who achieved fame by designing the Bourbon royal palace in Segovia in Spain. An archeological guide to the area notes that stones with Celtic bowl-shaped indentations, carried there by villagers in past centuries, can be seen in the walls and on doorsteps around the Church of San Vigilio.

=== Swiss Customs Museum ===
On the opposite side of the lake to Gandria village, but still within the Gandria quarter, is the Swiss Customs Museum. This was once a border post on the adjacent border with Italy, but now forms part of the Swiss National Museum. The museum covers the history of smuggling in the area, and the work of customs officers to counteract it. In a modern context, it covers the work of the Swiss Federal Customs Administration and the Swiss Border Guard.

== An international village ==
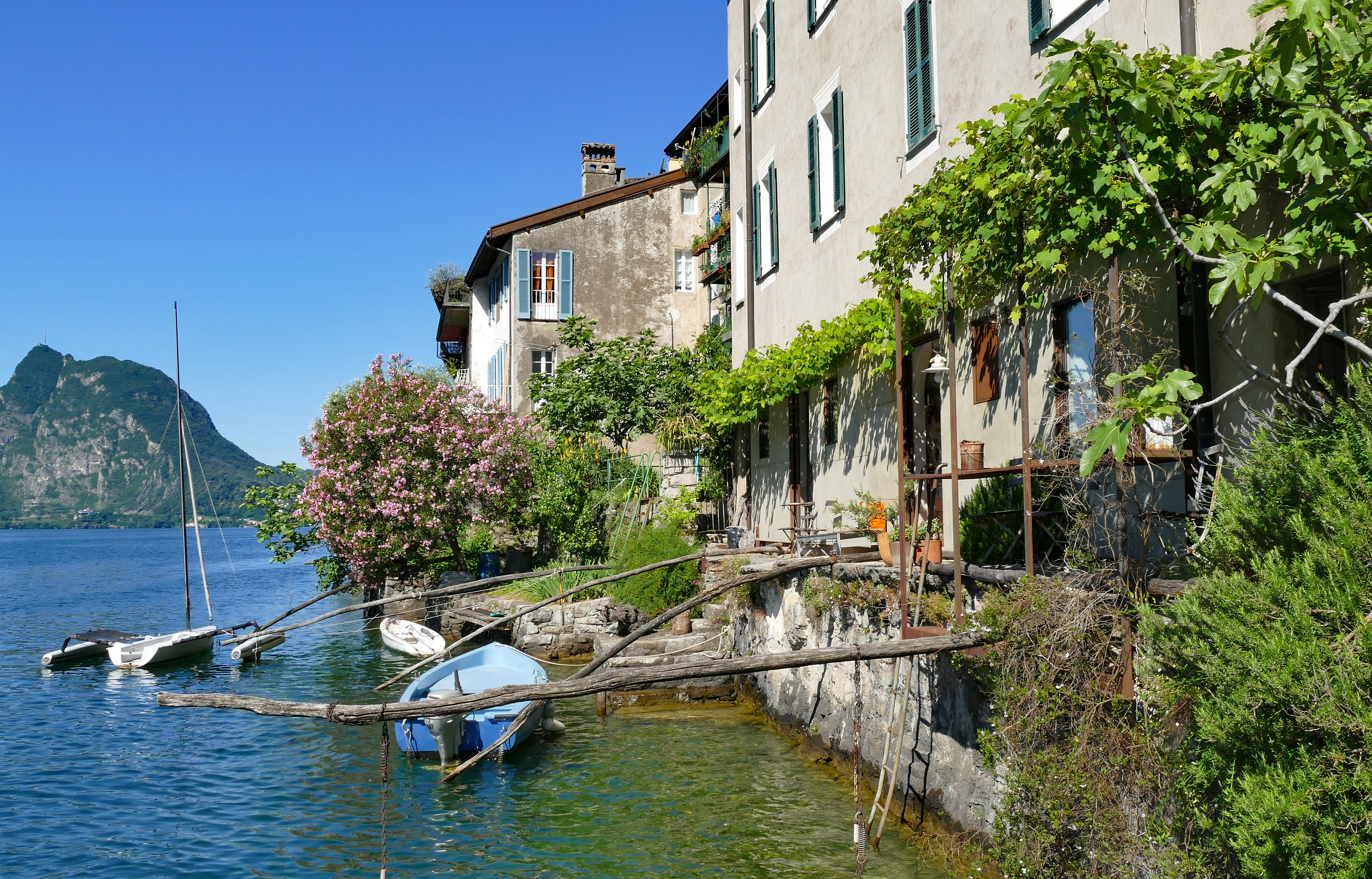
The waterfront looking west, with Monte San Salvatore in the distance

Today, Gandria is a mix of tradition and modernity. Many of 200 inhabitants who live there year-round are from families that go back for many generations. Others have arrived from various cantons of Switzerland as well as countries as diverse as Colombia, Germany, Haiti, Italy, Nicaragua, Palestine and the United States. Most people work in the nearby financial center of Lugano, although there is a tradition of architects, musicians, painters, ceramic makers and other artists in the village.

== Transport ==
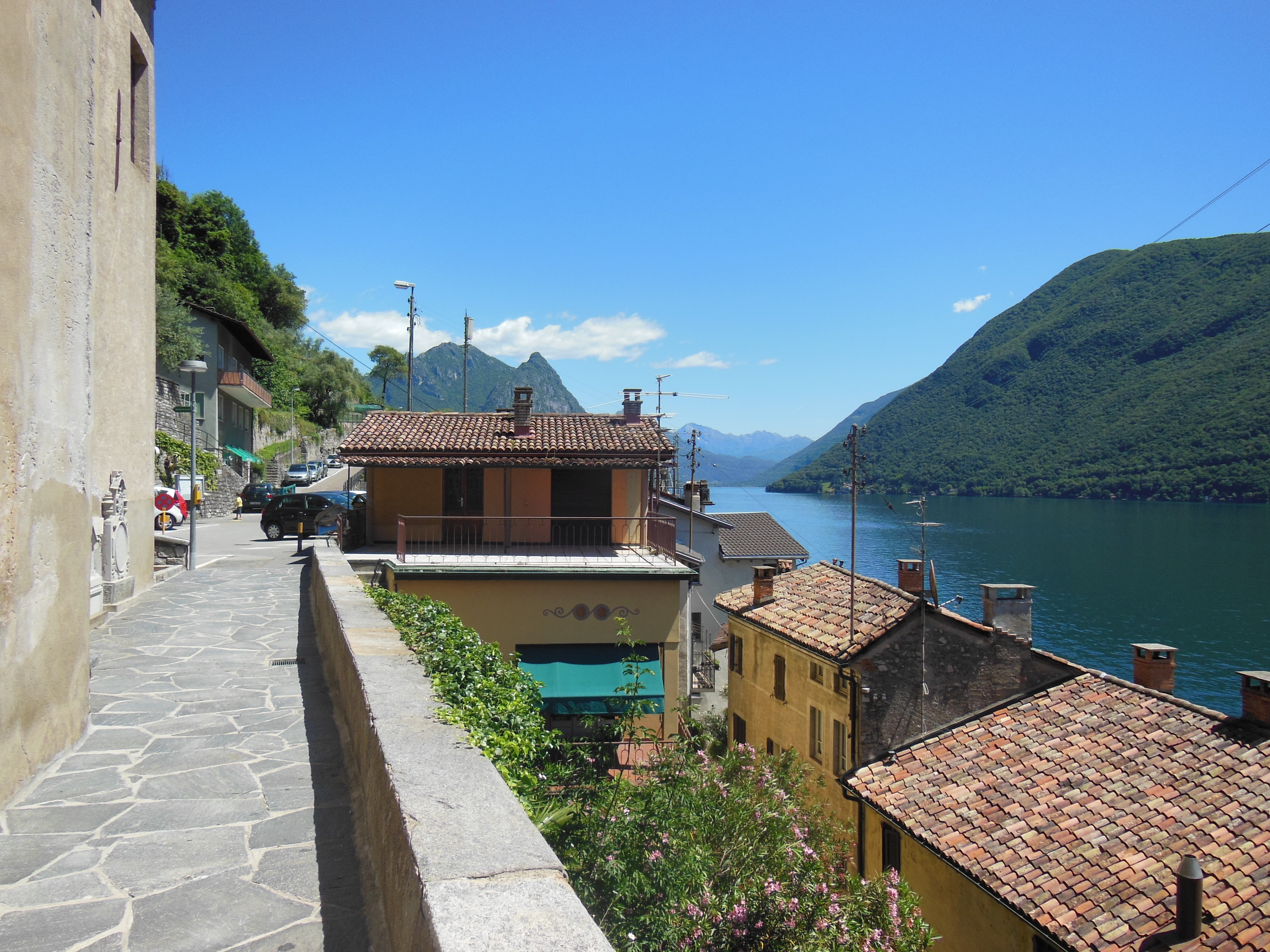
Road access to upper levels

Gandria village and its surrounding areas are connected to Lugano, and to Italy, by the main road that runs along the northern shore of Lake Lugano. This passes above the village centre, which, by virtue of its extremely narrow streets and steep gradients, is inaccessible to vehicles. In addition to the higher level road, it is also possible to walk from Gandria to Lugano and other surrounding villages via the publicly maintained lakeside Olive Path hewn into the rock in 1936.

A boat service between Gandria and other towns on the lake is provided by the Società Navigazione del Lago di Lugano (SNL) and is regular. The same company also operates a bus service between Gandria and Lugano.

The portion of Gandria on the south side of the lake, around Cantine di Gandria and the Swiss Customs Museum, has no roads. The shore-side footpath, which links the area to Caprino, is subject to rockfalls and not recommended for the inexperienced walker. The SNL provide several crossings a day from Gandria village (and central Lugano) to piers at both the Cantine di Gandria and the Customs Museum.
