= Menaggio–Porlezza railway =

Former narrow gauge railway line in Italy

Overview
- Status: Closed and removed
- Locale: Province of Como, Lombardy, Italy
- Termini: Menaggio; Porlezza
- Stations: 7

Service
- Services: 1

History
- Opened: 1873
- Closed: 1939

Technical
- Line length: 12 km (7.5 mi)
- Track gauge: 850 mm (2 ft 9 15/32 in)
Route map
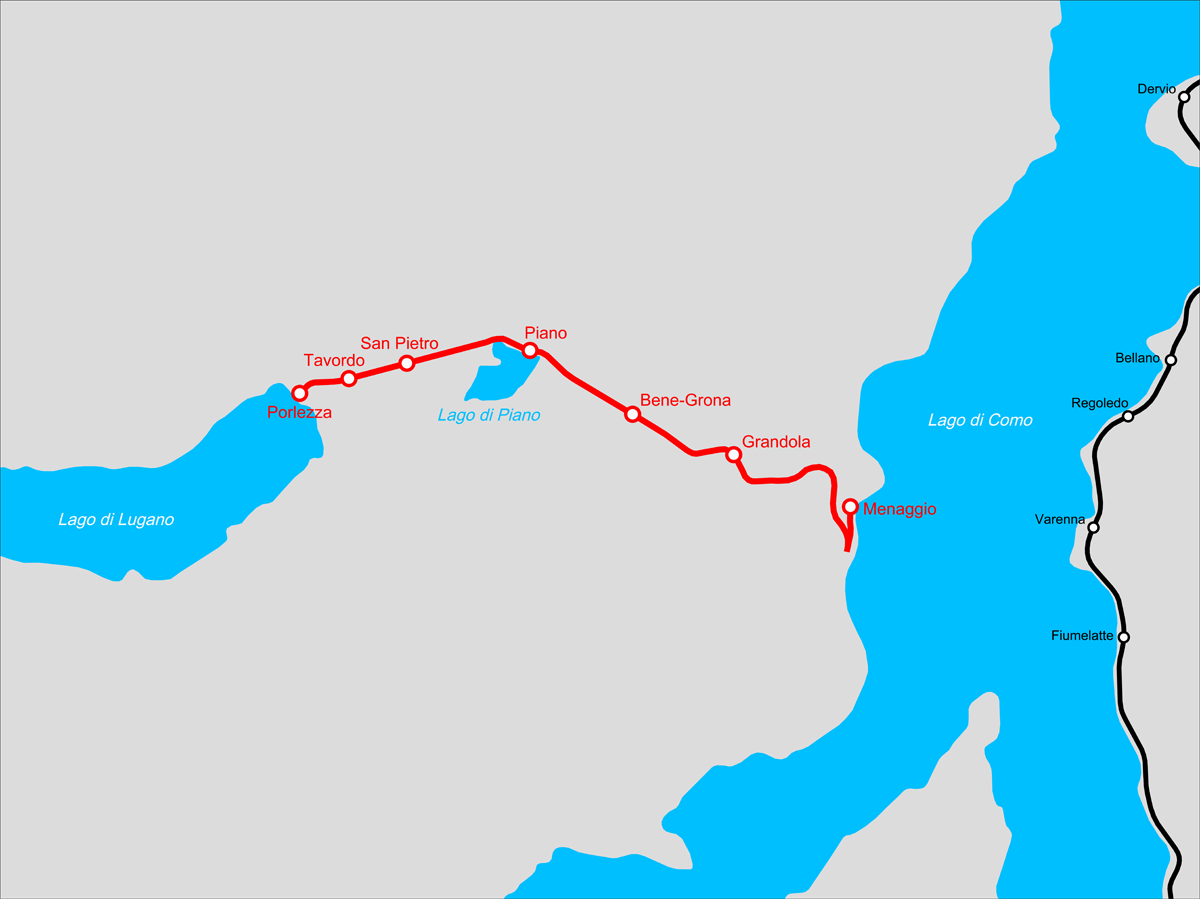

The Menaggio–Porlezza railway (Italian: Ferrovia Menaggio-Porlezza) was a railway in the Italian province of Como. The line connected the town of Menaggio, on Lake Como, with Porlezza, on Lake Lugano, and was built as part of a multi-modal transport link between Menaggio and Luino, on Lake Maggiore.

== History ==
Previous plans to link Menaggio and Luino envisaged an international railway via the Swiss city of Lugano, running for much of its length alongside Lake Lugano. However difficulties in financing the proposal, and the substantial engineering works that would be required alongside the lake, led to a revised plan which was eventually implemented. This involved the construction of two unconnected railways, both entirely located within Italy. The Menaggio–Porlezza railway and the Ponte Tresa–Luino railway were linked by the use of steamboats, between Porlezza and Ponte Tresa on Lake Lugano, to form the desired through route.

The Società di Navigazione e Ferrovie per lago di Lugano (SNF) was formed in 1873 to construct and operate this transport link. Although both ends of this link were in Italy, the company was created with Swiss finance, and headquartered in Lugano. The line was constructed to a gauge of 850 millimetres (2.79 ft), and was operated with steam locomotives.

The outbreak of World War I lead to a considerable loss of traffic and consequent financial problems, and the SNF decided to sell its railways and concentrate on operating its steamboat services on Lake Lugano. Both lines were sold to the Società Varesina per le Imprese Elettriche (SVIE) in 1919. After the sale, the SNF changed its name to the Società Navigazione del Lago di Lugano (SNL). The SNL still exists, operating shipping and bus services on and around Lake Lugano.

Whilst the Ponte Tresa–Luino railway was assimilated into the SVIE's existing network of electric railways that already served Luino, the Menaggio–Porlezza was isolated from the rest of the SVIE network. Plans to electrify it never came to fruition, and the SVIE arranged for the creation of a separate company (the Società Anonima Prealpina di Trasporto or SPT) which was jointly owned by the SVIE, Ferrovie Nord Milano and the Commercial Bank of Milan.

Traffic continued to decline, and road improvements meant that bus services could offer faster and cheaper journeys than the train. The line closed in 1939, although World War II delayed disposal of the line. Attempts to reopen the line after the war were unsuccessful, and the trackbed and buildings were all disposed of by 1966.
