= Menaggio =

Menaggio Menas (Lombard)
- Comune
- Comune di Menaggio, Città di Menaggio
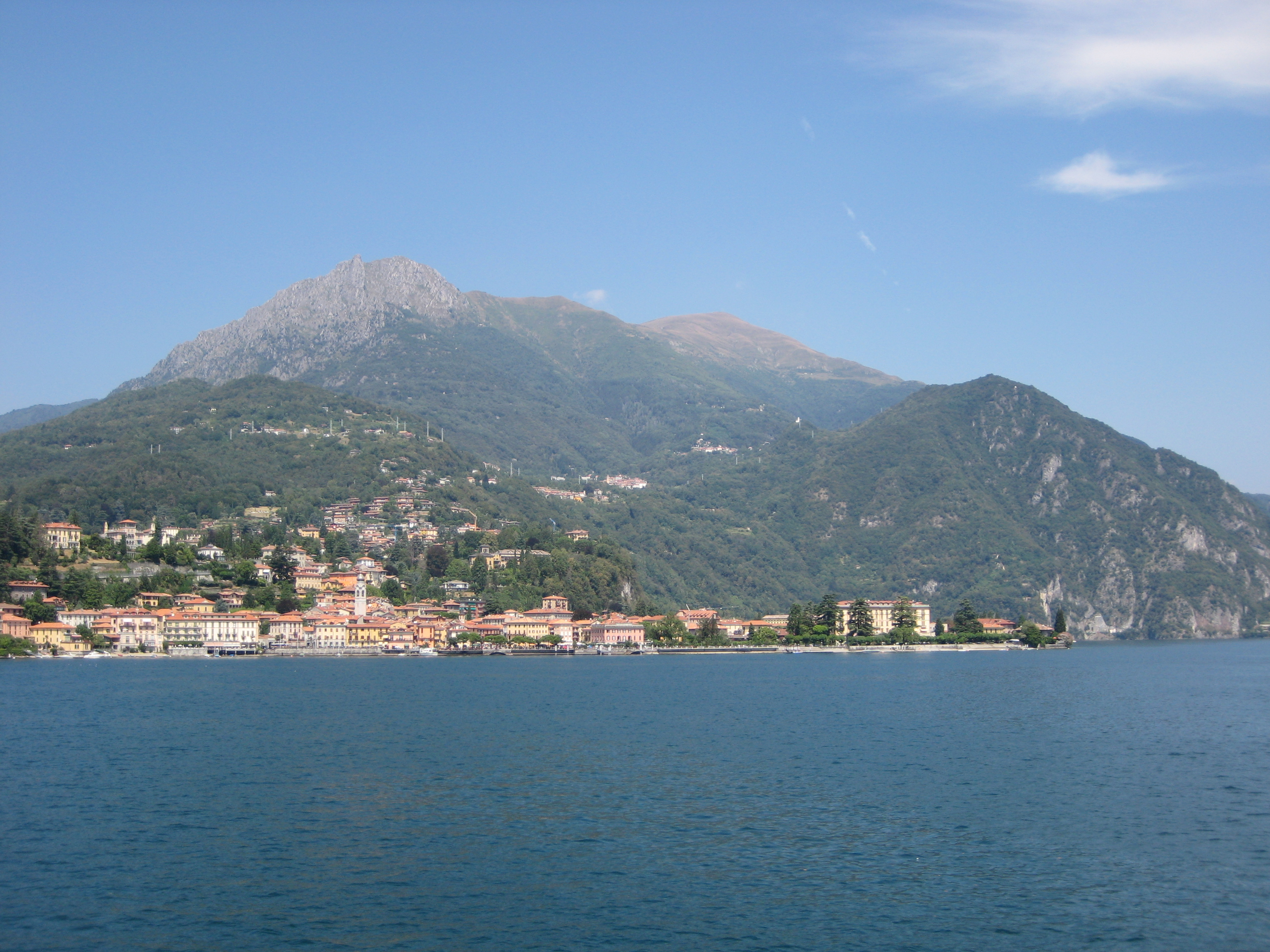

- Coat of arms

- Location within Italy Location within Lombardy
- Coordinates: 46°01′N 09°14′E
- Country: Italy
- Region: Lombardy
- Province: Como (CO)

Government
  - Mayor: Michele Spaggiari

Area
  - Total: 13 km^{2} (5.0 sq mi)

Population (31 December 2010)
  - Total: 3,273
  - Density: 250/km^{2} (650/sq mi)
- Demonym: Menaggini
- Time zone: UTC+1 (CET)
  - Summer (DST): UTC+2 (CEST)
- Postal code: 22017
- Dialing code: 0344
- Patron saint: St. Stephen
- Saint day: August 31

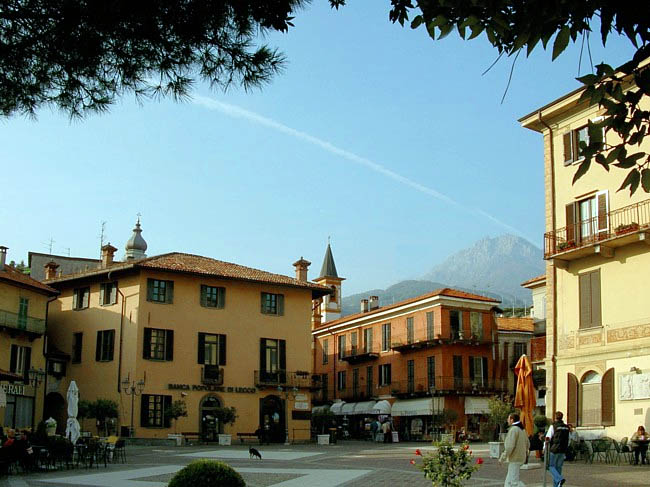
Piazza Garibaldi.

Menaggio (Comasco: Menas [meˈnaːs]) is a town and comune in the province of Como, Lombardy, northern Italy, located on the western shore of Lake Como at the mouth of the river Senagra.

Menaggio has three frazioni (parishes): Croce, Loveno and Nobiallo.

== History ==
The area of current Menaggio was conquered by the Romans in 196 BC. The Roman conquest culminated with the construction of a road called the Via Regina.

Menaggio was a walled city. Remnants of the wall are evident today.

Construction of hotels in this temperate commune popularized it as a summer resort area.

Between 1873 and 1939, Menaggio was linked to Porlezza, on Lake Lugano, by the Menaggio–Porlezza railway, a steam hauled narrow gauge line built as part of a multi-modal transport link between Menaggio and Luino, on Lake Maggiore.

== Tourism ==
The area of Menaggio is a favorite recreational resort in the summer. Lake Como's only youth hostel is in Menaggio.

Menaggio is known for its Menaggio and Cadenabbia Golf Club, founded in 1907 by an English gentleman, one of many who was spending his holidays on Lake Como during the late 19th century.

== Geology ==
The craggy and often fog hidden mountains are from the Cretaceous period, composed of limestone sediment weathered by millennia.

== Events ==
Among many events which occur in the town every summer, the Menaggio Guitar Festival is relevant on an international scale. Guitarists who have played there since its first edition on 2005 include Pete Huttlinger, Martin Taylor, Franco Cerri, Roman Bunka, Solorazaf and Ferenc Snetberger.

The artistic director is Sergio Fabian Lavia, composer and musician born in Argentina.

Marga Boodts a woman who claimed to be Grand Duchess Olga Nikolaevna of Russia resided in Menaggio from 1943 to her death in 1976. She was frequently visited by her “sister” Ceclava Czapska and her memoirs were published in Spain in 2012, with the help of an American historian named Marie Stravlo.

== Twin towns ==
- Allevard, France
- Carapicuíba, Brazil
- Wolpertswende, Germany
