= Caprino, Switzerland =

Coordinates: 45°59′3″N 8°58′47″E

Caprino
- Village
- Interactive map of Caprino
- Country: Switzerland
- Canton: Ticino
- District: Lugano
- City: Lugano
- Quarter: Castagnola-Cassarate

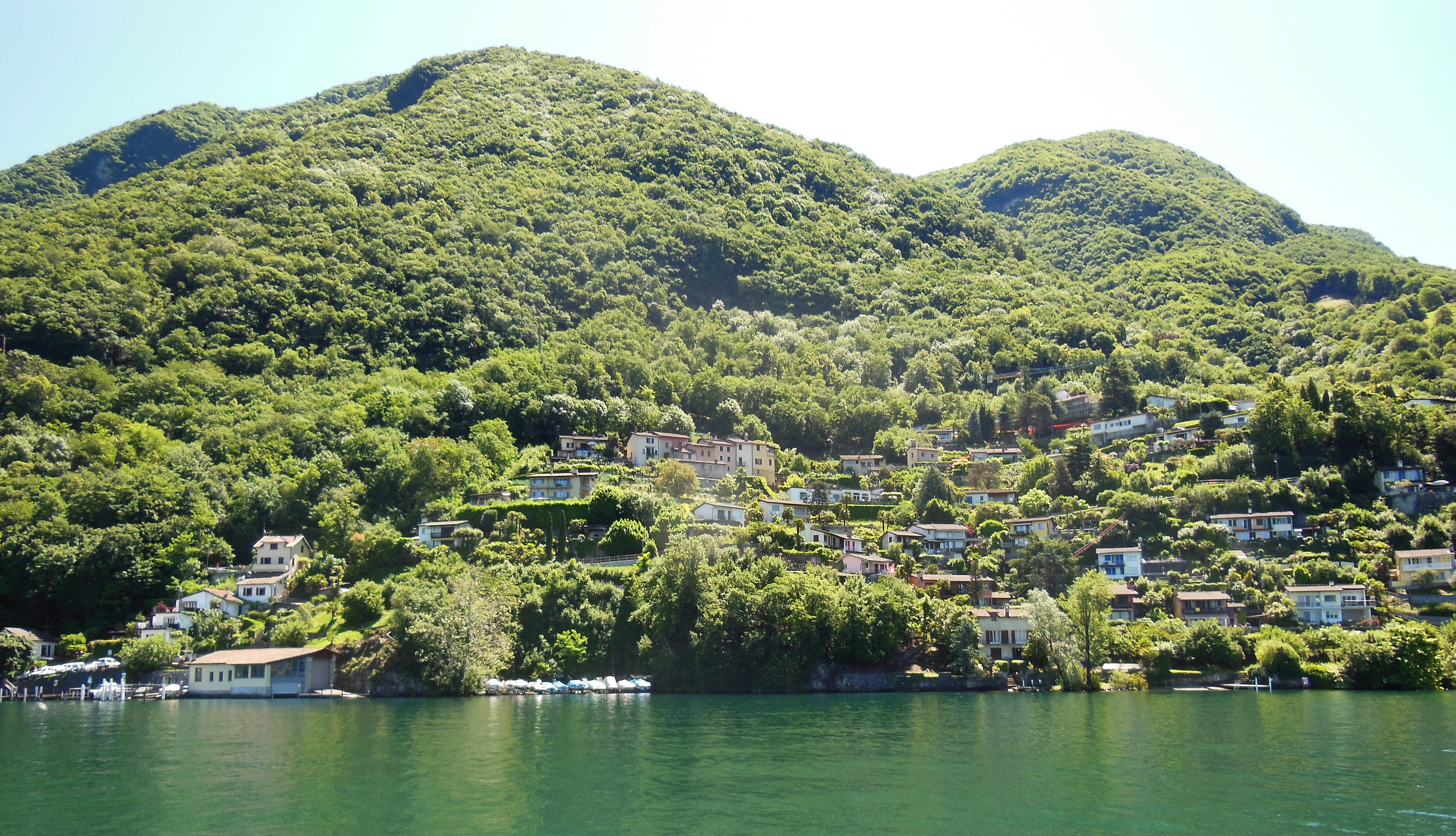
The village of Caprino from the water.

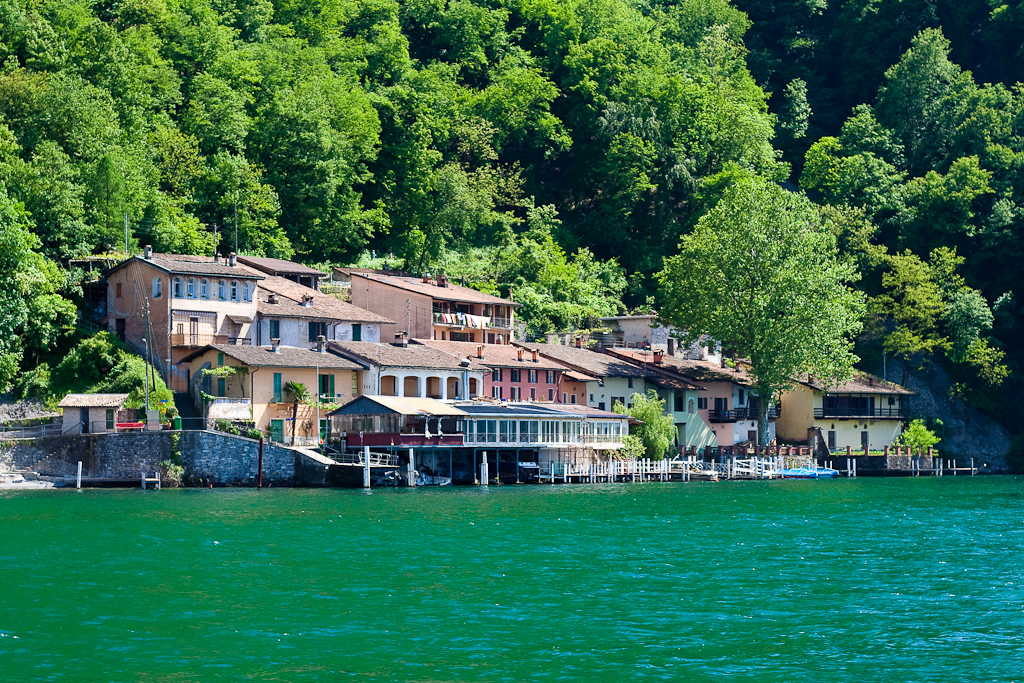
Lakeside houses in Cantine di Caprino.

Caprino is a village on the southern shore of Lake Lugano in the Swiss canton of Ticino, to the east of the Italian exclave of Campione d'Italia and below the summit of Sighignola. Some 0.5 kilometres (0.31 mi) east of Caprino village is Cantine di Caprino, a smaller settlement. Politically both form part of the Castagnola-Cassarate quarter of the city of Lugano, although until 1972 Castagnola-Cassarate was an independent municipality under the name Castagnola.

Caprino has no direct road connection with rest of the city of Lugano, or indeed the bulk of its quarter of Castagnola-Cassarate, which lie on the other side of Lake Lugano. An indirect road connection can be made via Arogno, Maroggia and the Melide causeway, but by this route Castagnola is some 21 kilometres (13 mi) distant, compared to under 2 kilometres (1.2 mi) across the lake. Cantine di Caprino has no road access, although it is linked to Caprino village by a footpath.

Boats of the Società Navigazione del Lago di Lugano (SNL) provide several crossings a day to central Lugano. Boats call at San Rocco landing stage in Caprino village and at Cantine di Caprino. Water taxis are also available.
