= Swiss Border Guard =

Swiss Border Guard: Grenzwachtkorps (German); Corps des gardes-frontière (French); Corpo delle guardie di confine (Italian); Corp da guardias da cunfin (Romansh)

Jurisdictional structure
- Federal agency (Operations jurisdiction): Switzerland
- Operations jurisdiction: Switzerland
- Legal jurisdiction: Federal administration of Switzerland
- General nature: Federal law enforcement
- Specialist jurisdiction: National border patrol, security, integrity

Operational structure
- Elected officer responsible: Ueli Maurer, Federal Council
- Parent agency: Federal Department of Finance; Federal Customs Administration

Website
- ezv.admin.ch/operationen

The Swiss Border Guard, known as the Swiss Border Guard Command, (Note: German: Grenzwachtkorps,French: Corps des gardes-frontière, Italian: Corpo delle guardie di confine, Romansh: Corp da guardias da cunfin) was a federal law enforcement agency, which acted as both the border guard and customs service for Switzerland. It was a uniformed and armed section of the Federal Customs Administration, which is attached to the Federal Department of Finance. It was the largest civilian security agency on a federal level.

The Swiss Border Guard took care of the prevention, intervention and repression concerning customs and migration related matters. It enforced border security and national compensating measures under the Schengen Agreement. The guard participated in international missions of the European Agency for the Management of Operational Cooperation at the External Borders (Frontex).

== History ==
The modern iteration of the SBG first started in 1915 after federal measures for border control were introduced.

By 2021, the Swiss Border Guard was integrated into the Operations Directorate of the Federal Customs Administration.

== Tasks ==
The Swiss Border Guard controlled people and merchandise crossing the Swiss border, while combating smuggling and trans-border crime. It also participated in international missions. Furthermore, the Swiss Border Guard supplied agents (Ground and air marshals) to the Federal Office of Police, the agents being tasked with preventing incidents on board aircraft and at airports. In its entirety, the Swiss Border Guard was tasked with enforcing over 150 national laws.

The Swiss Border Guard had three strategic areas of work:

- Customs related duties.
- Security and policing duties.
- Migration related duties.

These strategic areas fell within the original legal framework of the Swiss Border Guard. Additionally, the cantons of Switzerland could delegate additional competences to the Swiss Border Guard. The Swiss Border Guard had no own aircraft, therefore the Swiss Border Guard was supported by the Swiss Air Force with Helicopters (with and without FLIR) and the RUAG Ranger.

=== Customs duties ===
Customs duties fulfilled by the Border Guard included:

- The fight against smuggling, including the smuggling of prohibited goods such as weapons, narcotics etc.
- The collection of taxes and duties such as VAT, customs, and road taxes.
- The fulfillment of economic, commercial, health and environmental police tasks, such as the fight against undeclared work, the trade in counterfeit branded goods and medicines, as well as the trade in protected animal and plant species.

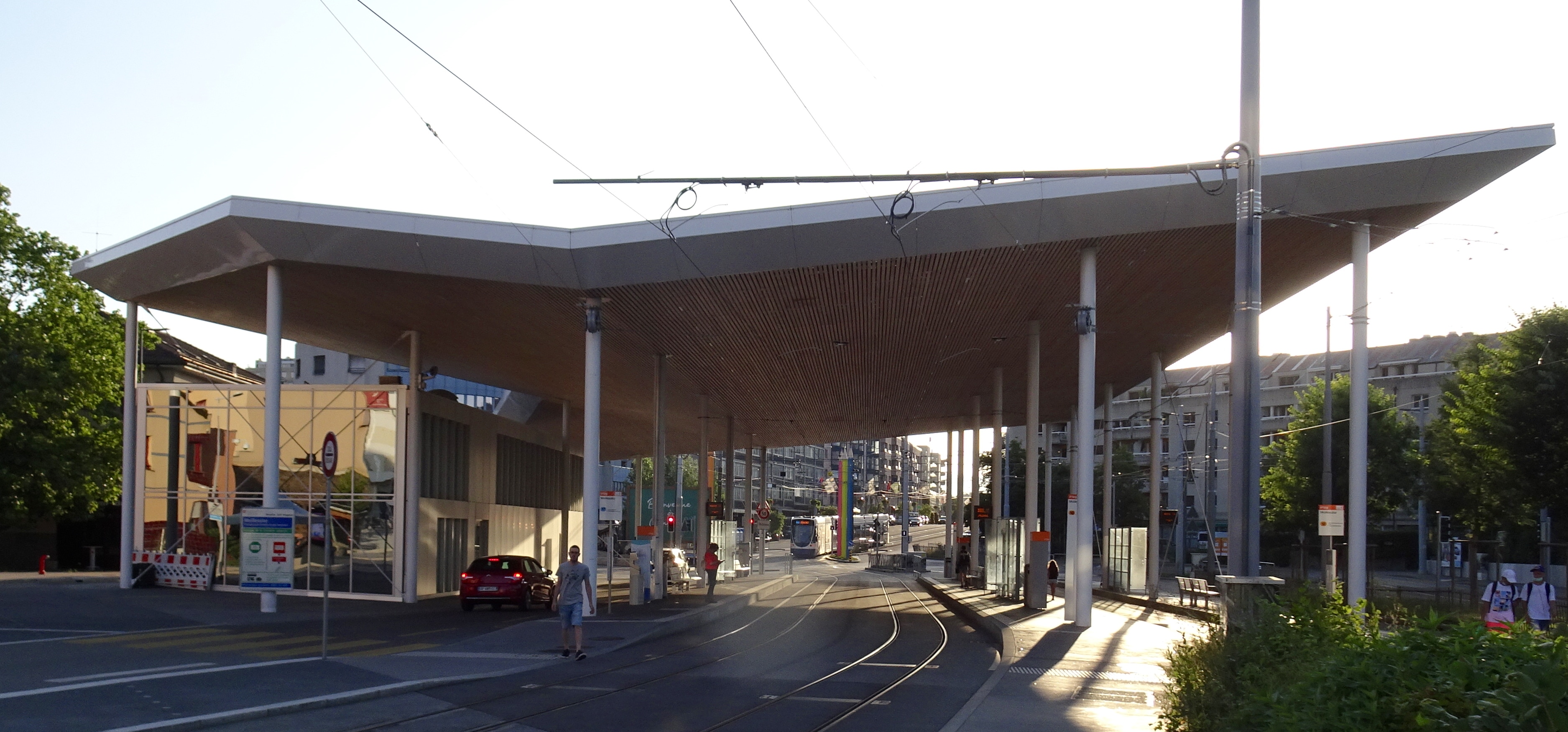
Moillesullaz customs (French border)

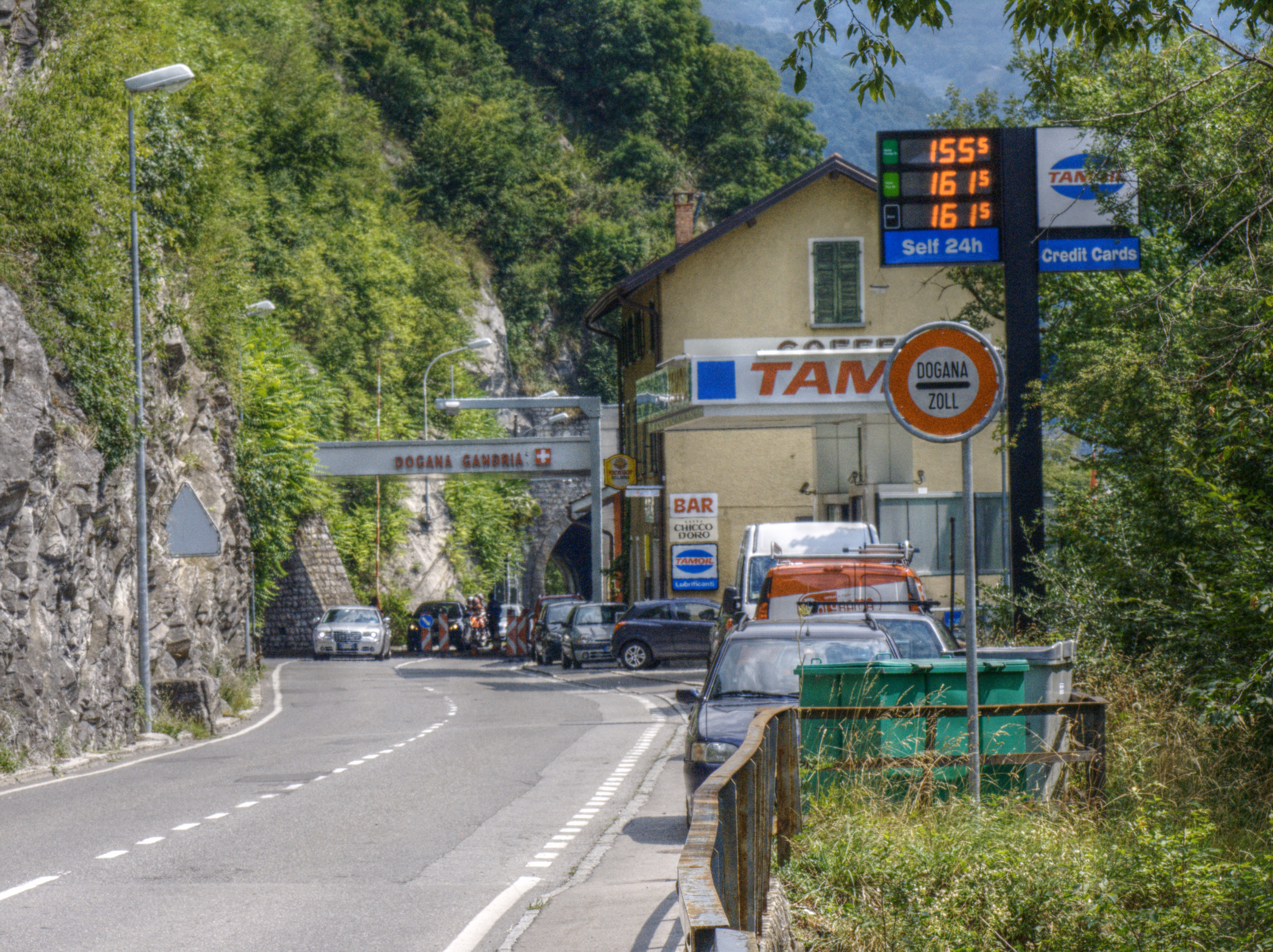
Gandria customs (Italian border)

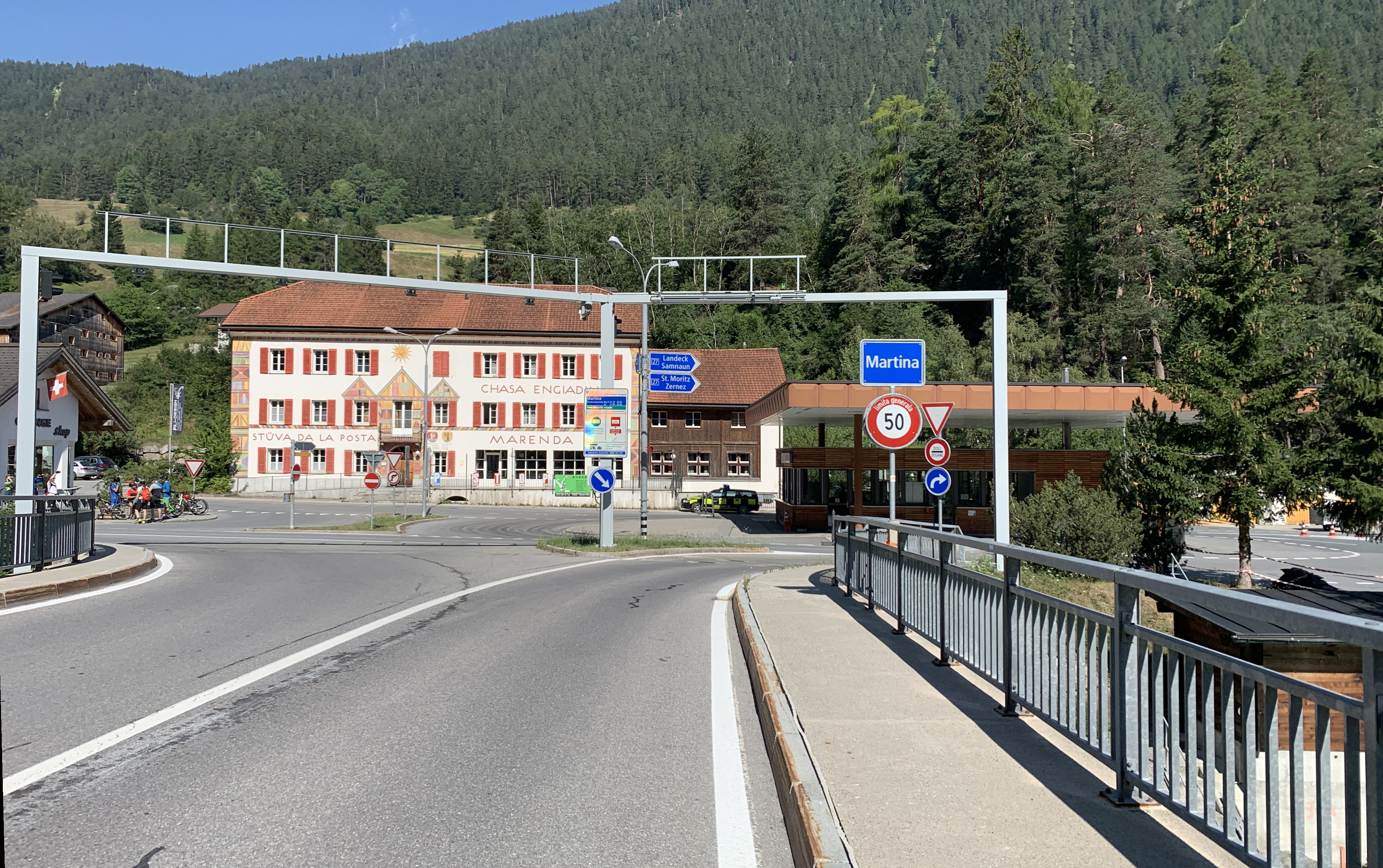
Martina customs (Austrian border)

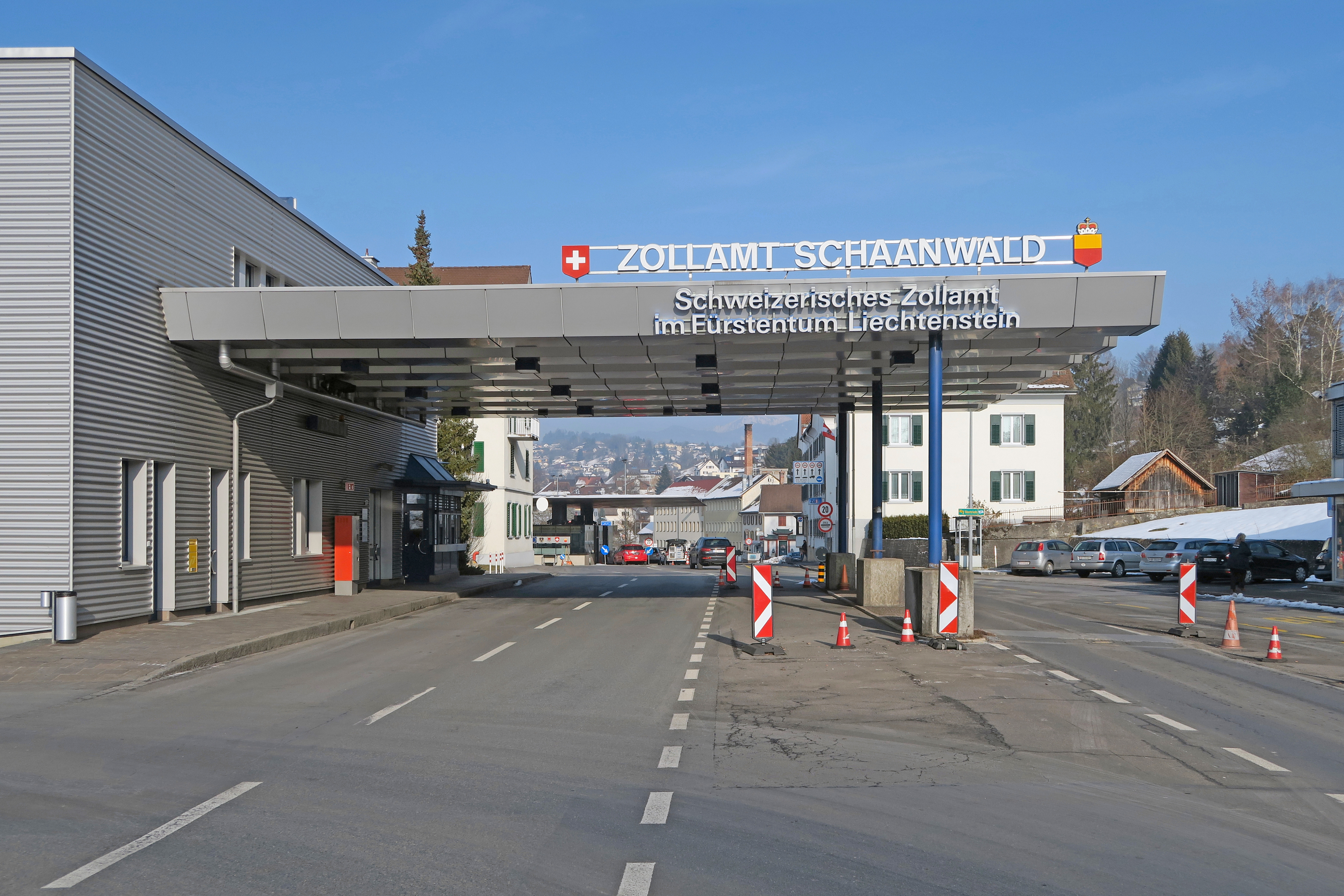
Schaanwald (FL) customs (Austrian border in Liechtenstein)

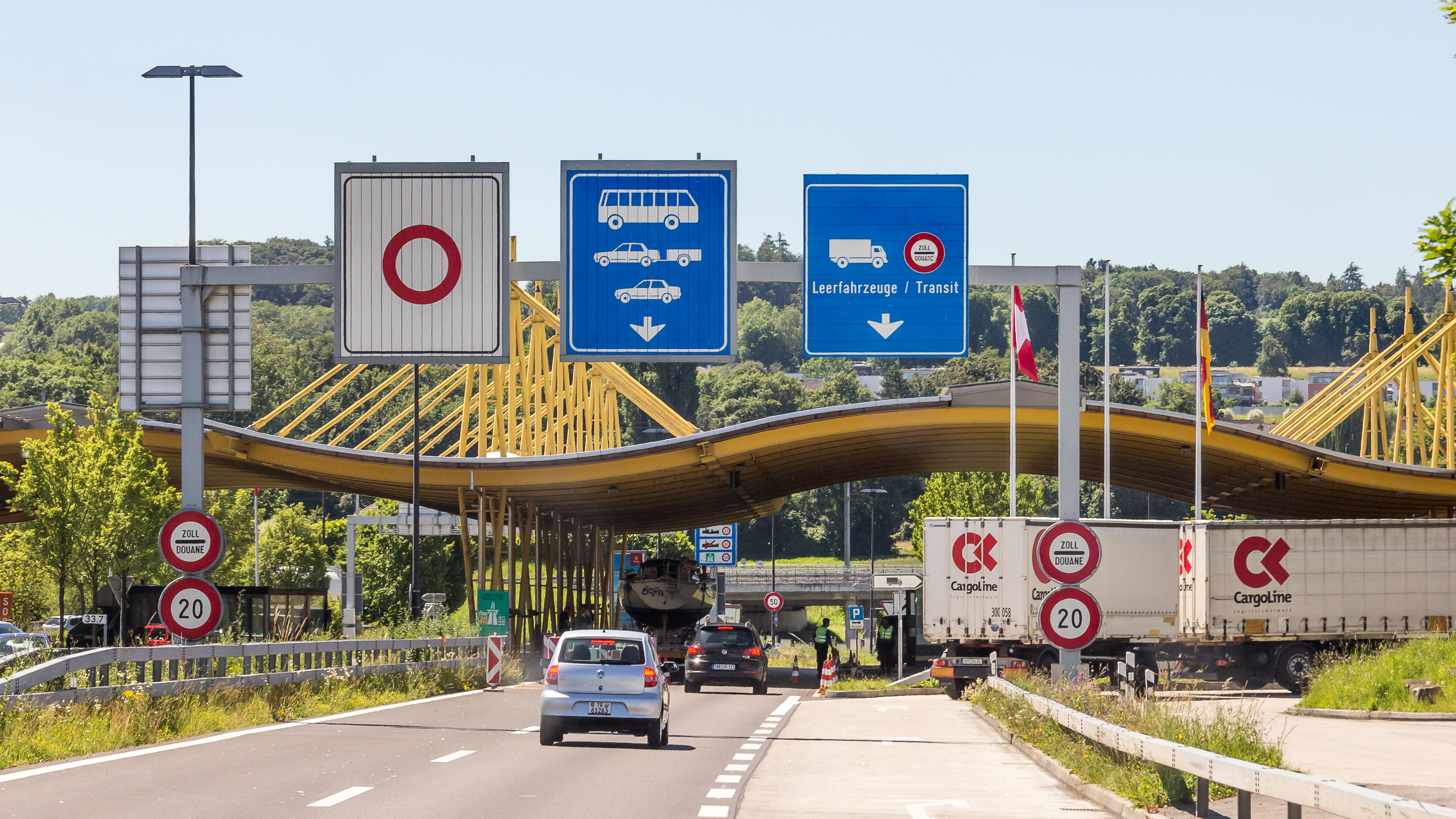
Kreuzlingen customs (German border)

=== Security Police duties ===
Security duties included:

- The investigation of persons, objects and vehicles and the detection of counterfeit documents to combat cross-border crime.
- The control of cross-border cash transactions to combat money laundering and terrorist financing.
- Security operations to ward off criminal acts on board Swiss aircraft in international commercial aviation.

=== Migration duties ===
Migration duties included:

- Passport controls at the Schengen external borders of Switzerland at the international airports of Geneva, Basel, and Lugano-Agno (at Zurich Airport, this is carried out by the cantonal police in Zurich, at Bern Airport by the Bernese cantonal police), as well as random checks at the land borders (internal Schengen border) and inland document checks near the border.
- The prevention of illegal entry, departure or transit as well as illegal residence.
- The fight against smuggling and trafficking.

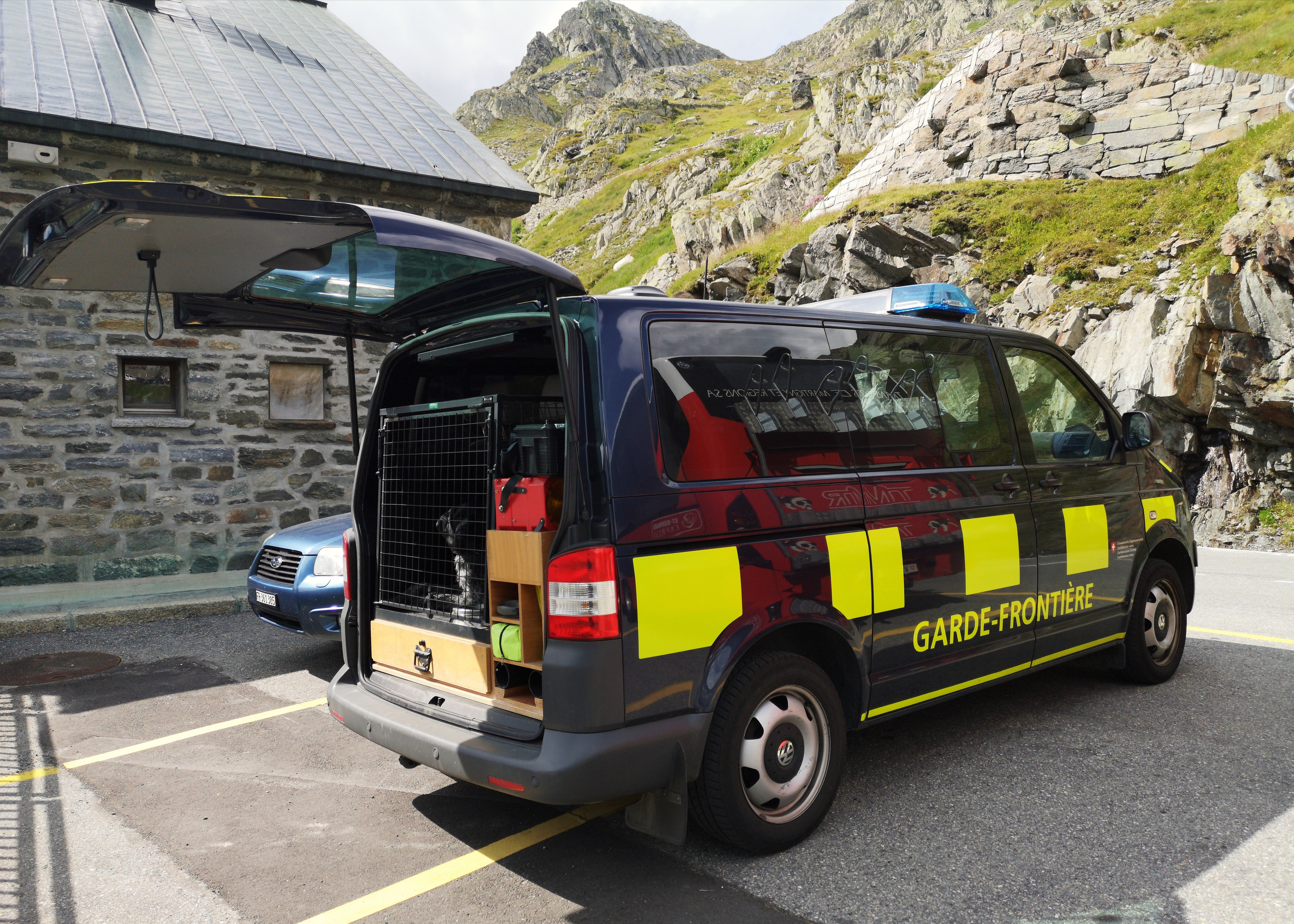
Border Guard vehicle at the Great St. Bernard Pass

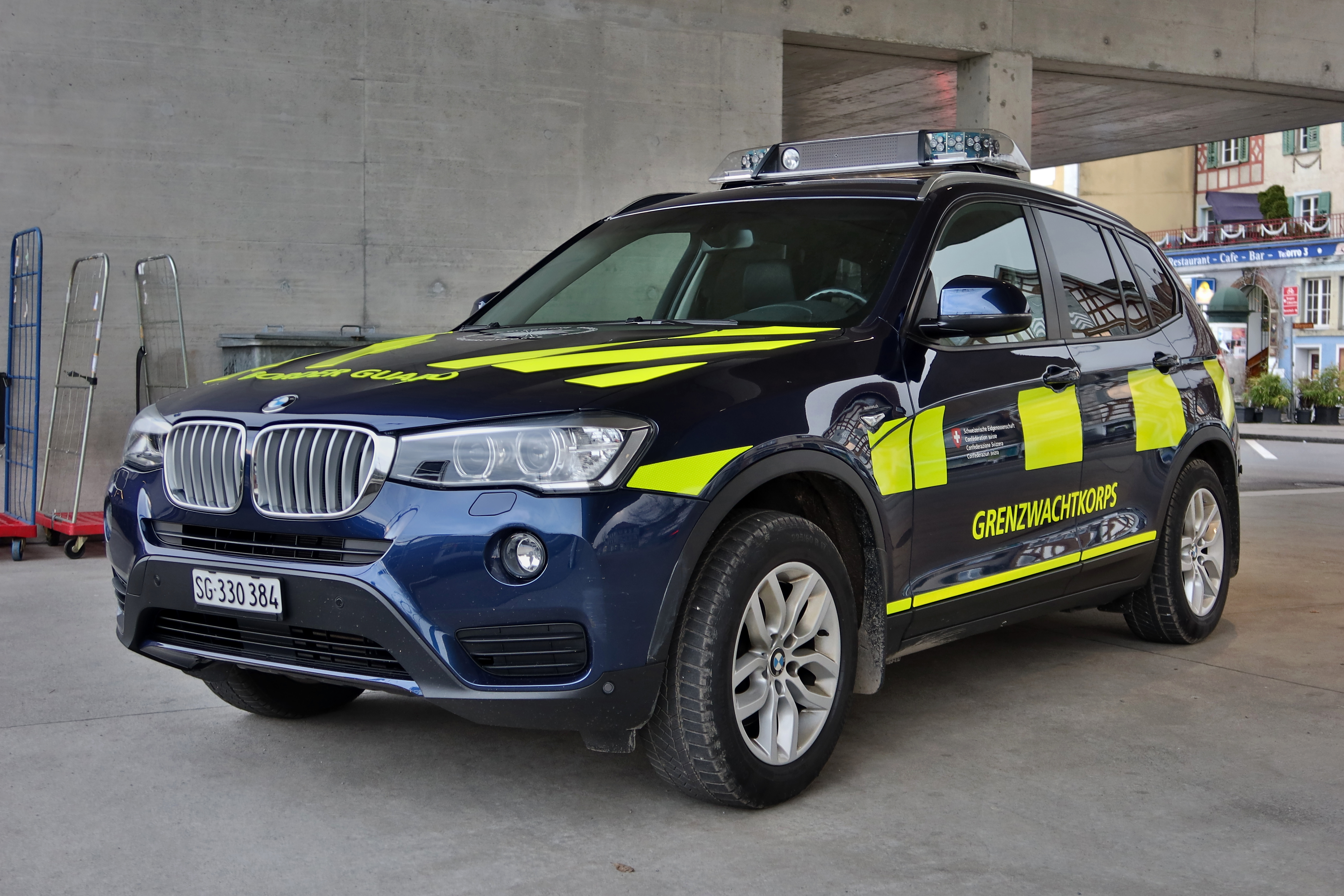
Another Border Guard vehicle in Rheineck

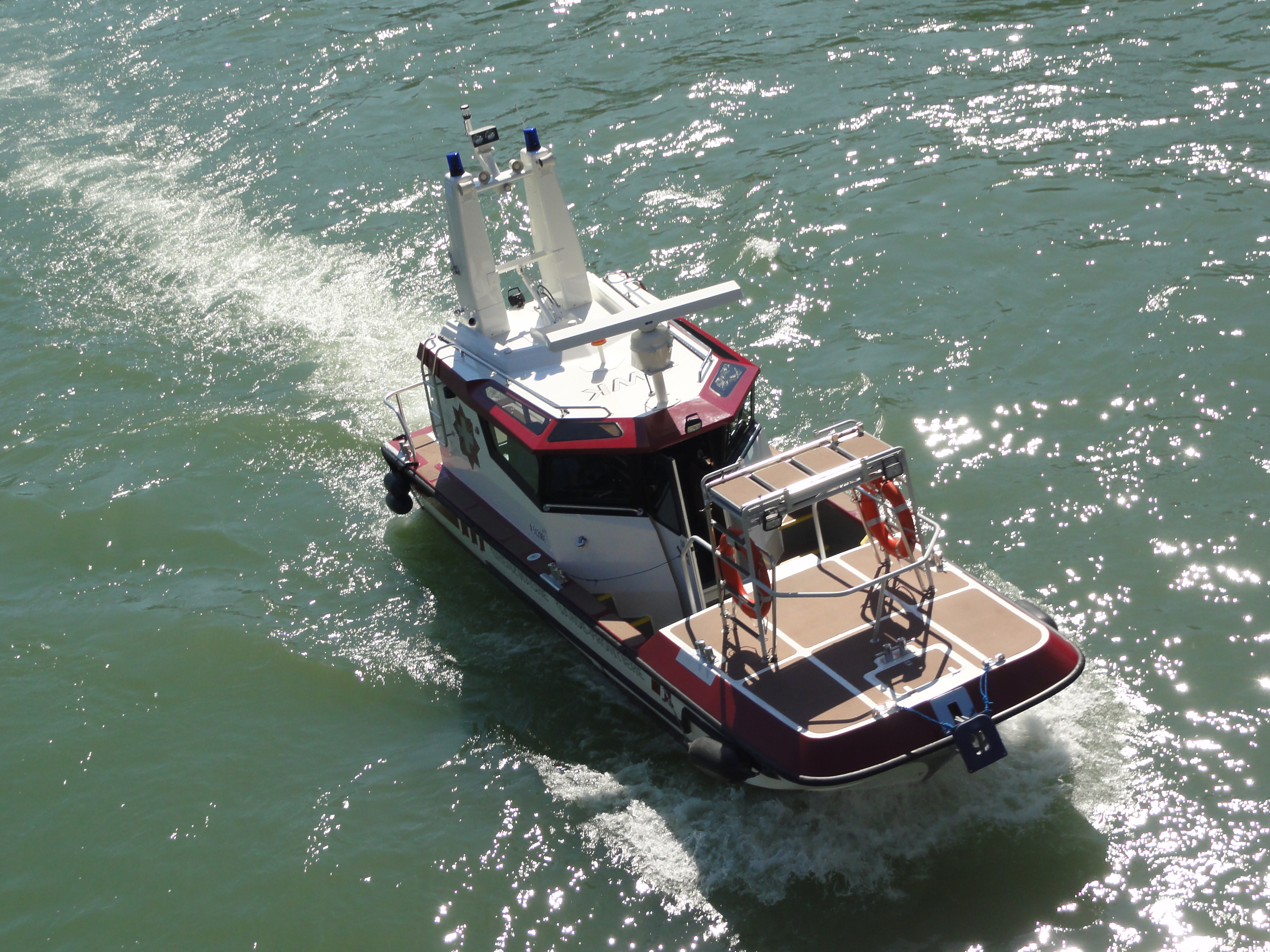
Border Guard ship in Basel

== Organisation ==
The Border Guard was divided into the following three hierarchical levels:

=== Strategic level ===
The Border Guard Corps Command (Kommando Grenzwachtkorps) (Kdo GWK) based in the headquarters in Bern formed the strategic level. It was divided into the sections staff services, operations, technology/logistics, teaching association, and special formation. It was managed by the Chief Border Guard (Chef Grenzwachtkorps) (C GWK).

The border guard corps command performed strategic and operational tasks. These included the planning and management of national and international operations, national large scale training, foreign assignments, and training.

Additional elements of management support included:

- The Situation and News Center of the Border Guard (LNZ GWK) in the headquarters evaluated national and international reports, processed and disseminated findings and compiled information bulletins.
- The training centers of the Federal Customs Administration in Liestal and the Competence Center for Security and Intervention (KOSIT) in Interlaken provided training and further education.

=== Operational level ===
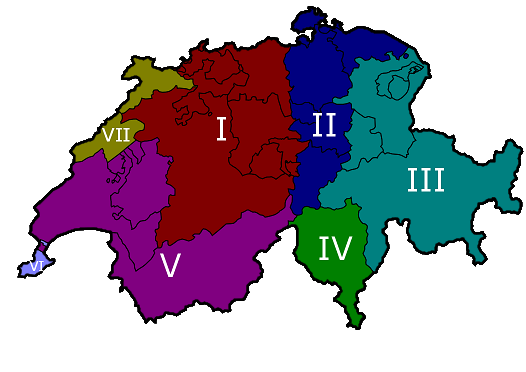
Map of seven regional divisions

The seven border guard regions formed the operational level. They were provided with the corresponding Roman numerals and a place name and defined according to geotactic aspects. They were led by border guard commanders (Gzw Kdt).

Border guard regions carried out operational tasks that were not performed centrally. If required, this also included the supraregional planning and management of major events and operations, large scale training, and foreign assignments.

In addition to the Border Guard Command at the Swiss Federal Customs Administration in Bern, there were seven regional commandos, called Border Guard Regions:

- Border Guard Region I - Basel (cantons BS, BL, SO, AG, BE, LU, OW, NW)
- Border Guard Region II - Schaffhausen (Cantons ZH, SH, TG, SZ, UR, ZG)
- Border Guard Region III - Chur (cantons SG, GR, AR, AI, GL and Principality of Liechtenstein)
- Border Guard Region IV - Lugano (Canton TI, command in the municipality of Paradiso)
- Border Guard Region V - Lausanne (cantons VS, VD, FR)
- Border Guard VI - Geneva (Canton GE)
- Border Guard VIII - Porrentruy (cantons NE, JU)

The original eight border guard regions were introduced on 1 January 2007 as a replacement for the previous four border guard divisions. The Border Guard Region VII (Aargau / Zurich) with command at Zurich Airport was dissolved on 1 April 2011, and divided into border guard regions I (Canton Aargau) and II (Canton Zurich).

=== Tactical level ===
The 44 border guard posts (Gzw Po) and four operational centers (EZ GWK) of the border guard regions formed the tactical level. They were led by post chiefs (Pch). The border guards ensured service operation and daily service execution.

The following organizational units served as important elements of leadership support:

- The four operational centers in Basel (EZ GWK North), Chur (EZ GWK East), Chiasso (EZ GWK South) and Geneva (EZ GWK West) were responsible for routine work.
- Coordination Centers (CCPD), the two Police and Customs Co-operation Centers (CCPD) in Chiasso and Geneva enabled a rapid exchange of information between Switzerland and Italy and France respectively.

== Ranks ==
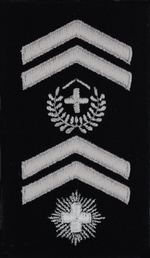
Rank insignia of a Stabsadjutant GWK, assigned to working in Border Guard Corps Command

The rank insignia on the shoulder straps of the Border Guard corresponded to the military ranks of the Swiss Army. The shoulder straps were additionally provided with the ray cross or Roman numerals (I-VIII). The beam cross indicated carriers assigned to the Border Guard Corps command. The Roman numerals corresponded to the respective border guard region in which the guard works.

== Equipment ==
Border Guards were issued Heckler & Koch P30 V4 with RUAG ACTION 4 9MM ammunition. Additionally, Heckler & Koch MP5 were available either on some border crossings (kept in dedicated safes) or were loaded onto patrol cars at the beginning of a shift.

== See also ==
- Federal Office of Police
- Federal Office for Customs and Border Security
