= Lugano =

City in Switzerland

Lugano Lugan (Lombard)
- Municipality
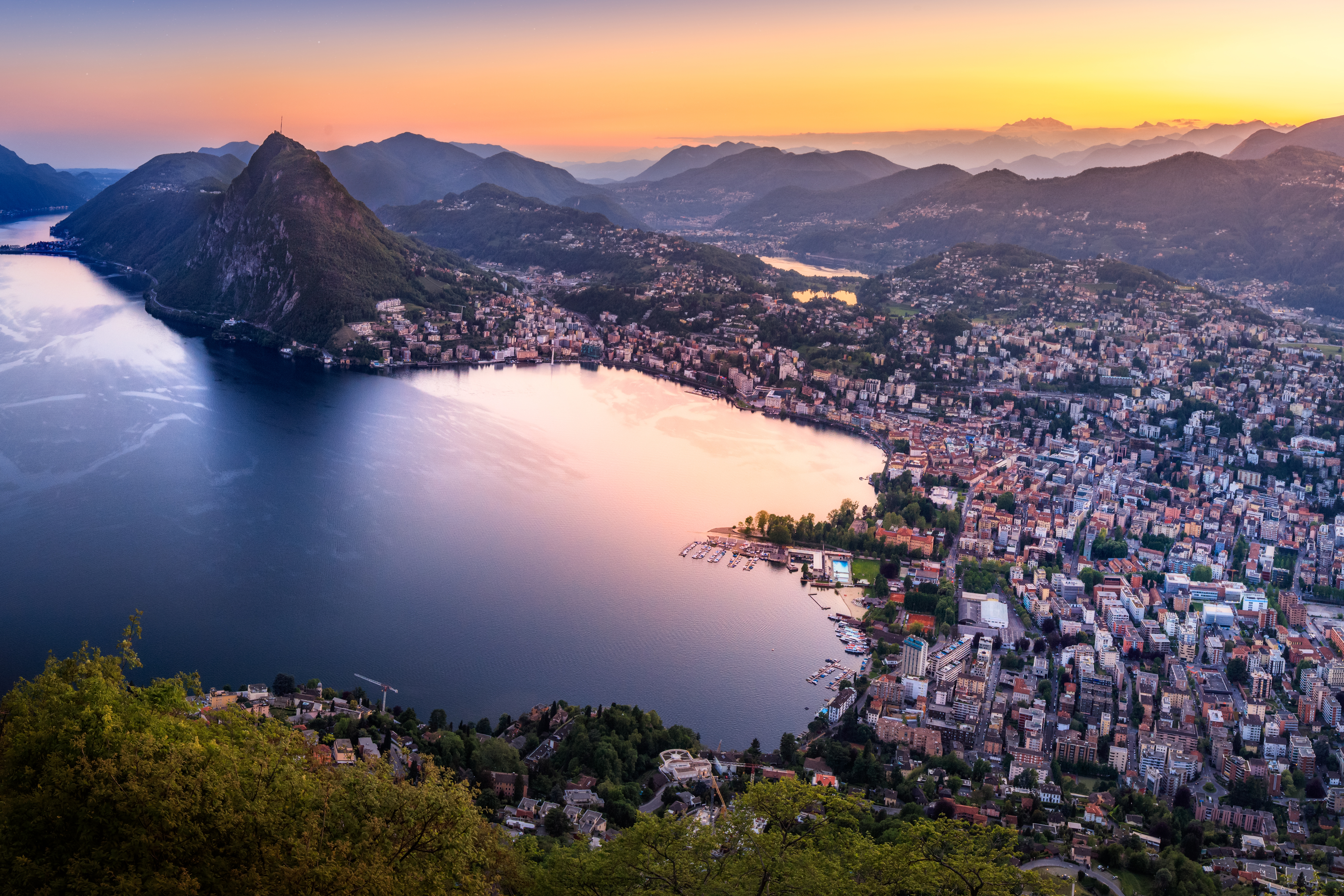
- The bay of Lugano at sunset

- Flag Coat of arms
- Location of Lugano
- Location within Switzerland Location within Canton of Ticino
- Coordinates: 46°00′18″N 08°57′09″E
- Country: Switzerland
- Canton: Ticino
- District: Lugano

Government
  - Executive: Municipio with 7 members
  - Mayor: Sindaco (list); Michele Foletti Ticino League (as of October 2021)
  - Parliament: Consiglio comunale with 60 members

Area
  - Total: 75.86 km^{2} (29.29 sq mi)
- Elevation (Lake shore, Centro): 273 m (896 ft)

Population (2025-12-31)
  - Total: 63,691
  - Density: 839.6/km^{2} (2,175/sq mi)
- Demonym: Luganese (Italian)
- Time zone: UTC+01:00 (CET)
  - Summer (DST): UTC+02:00 (CEST)
- Postal code: from 6900 to 6917, 6932, 6951, 6959, from 6962 to 6968, from 6974 to 6979
- SFOS number: 5192
- ISO 3166 code: CH-TI
- Localities: Barbengo, Besso, Brè-Aldesago, Breganzona, Cadro, Carabbia, Carona, Castagnola-Cassarate, Cureggia, Davesco-Soragno, Gandria, Loreto, Lugano Centro, Molino Nuovo, Pambio Noranco, Pazzallo, Pregassona, Sonvico, Val Colla, Viganello, Villa Luganese
- Surrounded by: Arogno, Bioggio, Brusimpiano (Italy), Campione d'Italia (Italy), Canobbio, Capriasca, Collina d'Oro, Grancia, Alta Valle Intelvi (Italy), Massagno, Melide, Morcote, Muzzano, Paradiso, Ponte Capriasca, Porza, Savosa, Sorengo, Valsolda (Italy), Vezia, Vico Morcote
- Website: www.lugano.ch

Lugano (/luːˈɡɑːnoʊ/ loo-GAH-noh, UK also /lʊˈɡænoʊ/ luu-GAN-oh, Italian: [luˈɡaːno]; Ticinese: Lugan [lyˈɡãː]) is a city and municipality within the Lugano District in the canton of Ticino, Switzerland. It is the largest city in both Ticino and the Italian-speaking region of southern Switzerland. Lugano is the ninth largest Swiss city proper, with a population of 63,691 as of 2025, and an urban agglomeration of over 150,000.

The city lies on Lake Lugano, at its largest width, and, together with the adjacent town of Paradiso, occupies the entire bay of Lugano. The territory of the municipality encompasses a much larger region on both sides of the lake, with numerous isolated villages. The region of Lugano is surrounded by the Lugano Prealps, the latter extending on most of the Sottoceneri region, the southernmost part of Ticino and Switzerland. Both western and eastern parts of the municipality share an international border with Italy.

Described as a market town since 984, Lugano was the object of continuous disputes between the sovereigns of Como and Milan until it became part of the Old Swiss Confederation in 1513. In 1803, the political municipality of Lugano was created, following the establishment of the canton. Since 1882, Lugano has been an important stop on the international Gotthard Railway. The rail brought a decisive contribution to the development of tourism and more generally of the tertiary sector which are, to this day, predominant in the economy of the city.

== Name and coat of arms ==
The toponym is first recorded in 804 AD, in the form Luanasco, in 874 as Luano, and from 1189 as Lugano. Traditional German-language variants of the name (now virtually unused) are Lowens, Lauis, Lauwis, Louwerz.

The local Lombard form of the name is rendered Lugan. The etymology of the name is uncertain, suggestions include derivation from Latin lucus ("grove"), from a Vulgar Latin *lakvannus ("lake-dweller") and from the god Lugus. In Romansch, especially in traditional Sursilvan dialect, the city is known as Ligiaun.

== History ==
=== Pre-history ===
The shores of Lake Lugano have been inhabited since the Stone Age. Within the modern city limits (Breganzona, Castagnola, Davesco and Gandria) several ground stones or quern-stones have been found. In the area surrounding Lugano, items from the Copper Age and the Iron Age have been found. There are Etruscan monuments at Davesco-Soragno (5th to 2nd century BC), Pregassona (3rd to 2nd century BC), and Viganello (3rd to 2nd century BC). Graves with jewellery and household items have been found in Aldesago, Davesco, Pazzallo and Pregassona along with Celtic money in Viganello.

The region around Lake Lugano was settled by the Romans by the 1st century BC. There was an important Roman town north of Lugano at Bioggio. There are fewer traces of the Romans in Lugano, but several inscriptions, graves and coins indicate that some Romans lived in what would become Lugano.

=== Foundation of Lugano ===
The first written mention of a settlement at Lugano can be found in documents, which are of disputed authenticity, with which the Longobard king Liutprand ceded various assets located in Lugano to the Church of Saint Carpophorus in Como in 724. Other documents, dating from 804 and 844 refer to Lake Lugano as Laco Luanasco, and an act of 984 indicates Lugano as a market town.

During the fighting between Guelphs and Ghibellines and the new disputes between Como and Milan, during the 14th and 15th centuries, Lugano was the scene of clashes between opposing forces. After a long rule by the Rusca family, Lugano was freed from the domination of Como, which had been taken over in 1335 from the Visconti. At the same time, the link between the town and the valley strengthened. By 1405–06 documents attest to a vallis comunitas Lugani et, a governing body that was independent of Como. The new community included the parishes of Lugano, Agno, Riva San Vitale and Capriasca. In 1416 the Duke of Milan, Filippo Maria Visconti, conquered the region of Lugano and the Rusca valley and made it a fief. A year later, Lugano's freedoms were first documented in a series of statutes modelled on those of Como. The town was able to secure complete independence.

=== Lugano during the Renaissance ===
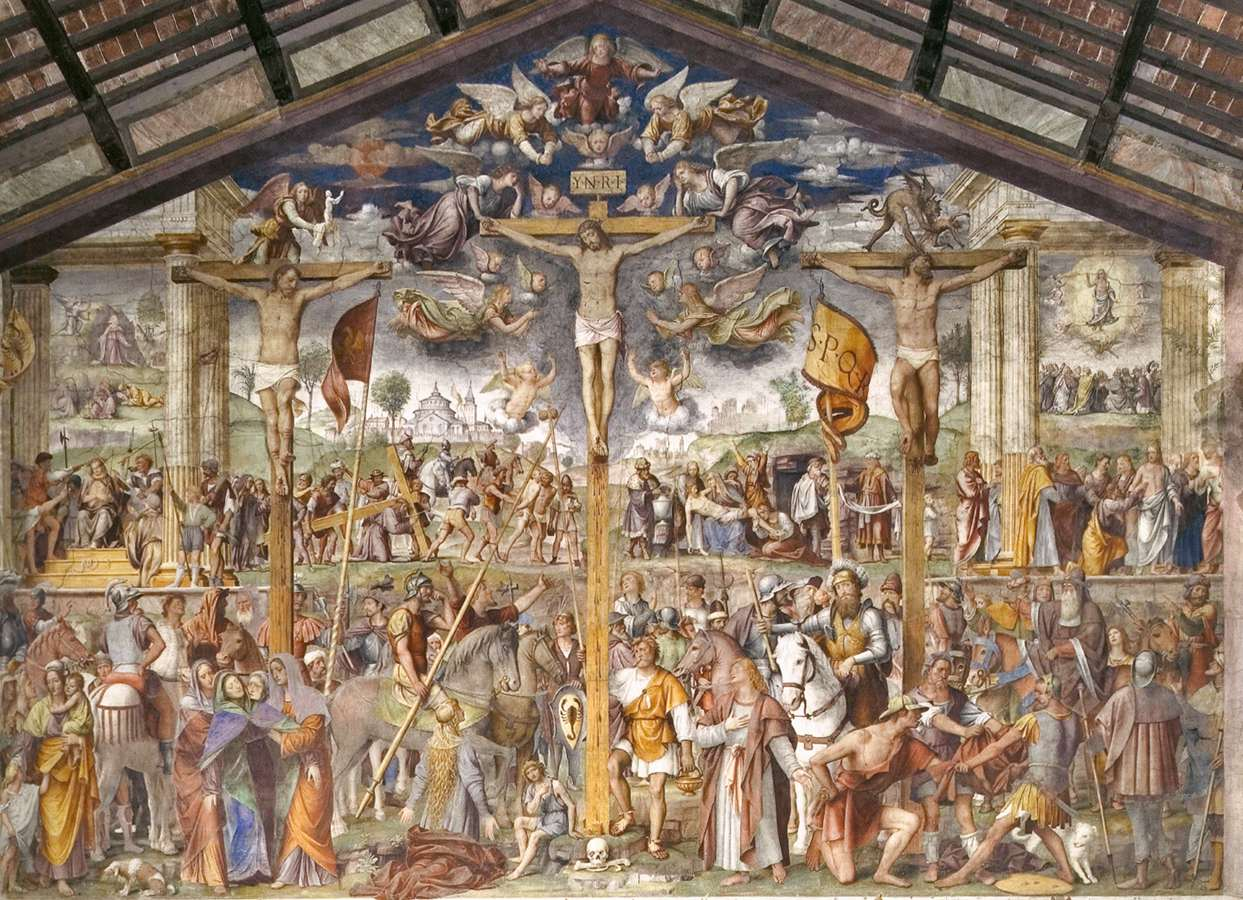
Fresco by Bernardino Luini, 1529

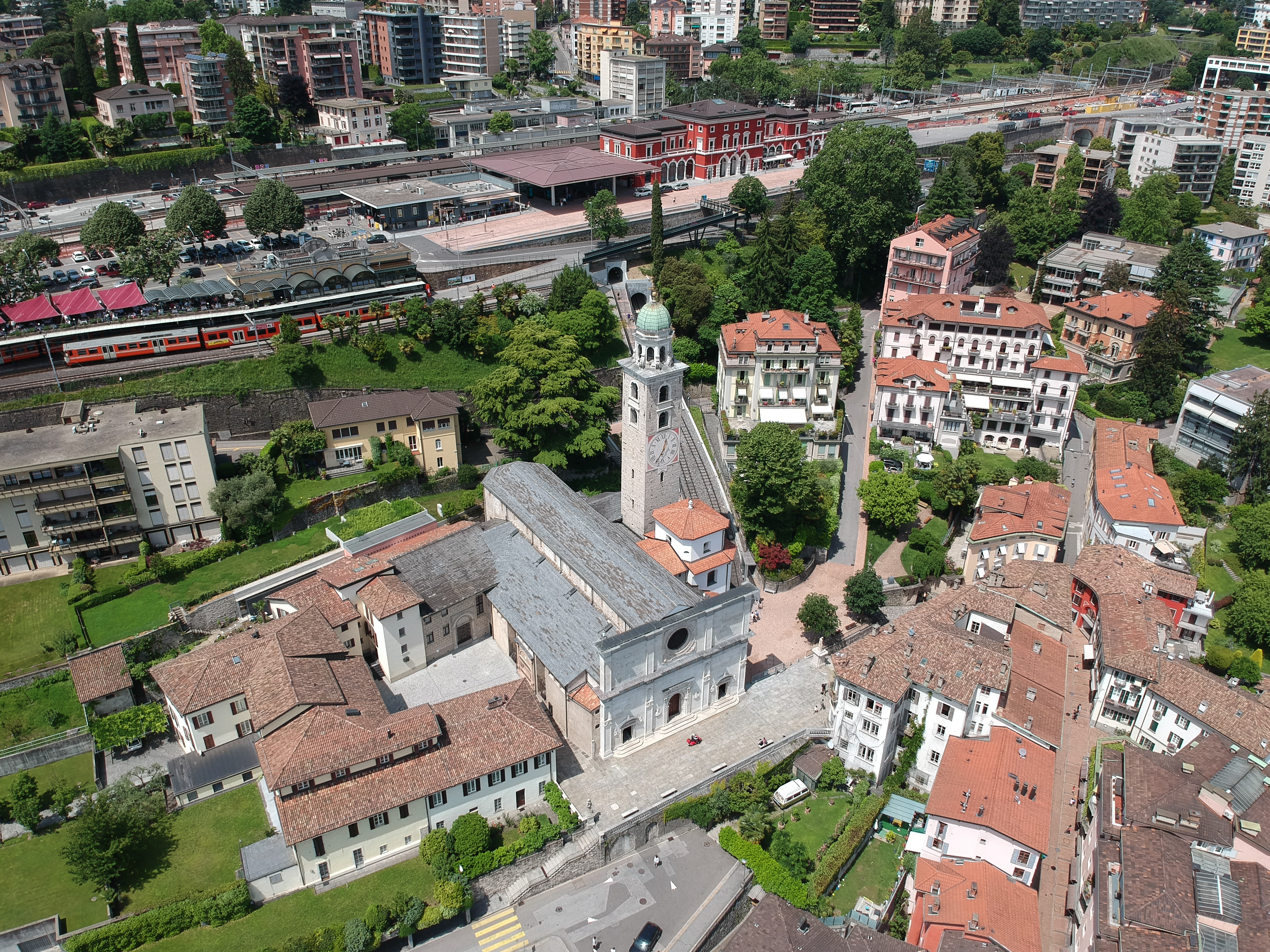
The 15th century Cathedral of San Lorenzo is now the seat of the Diocese of Lugano

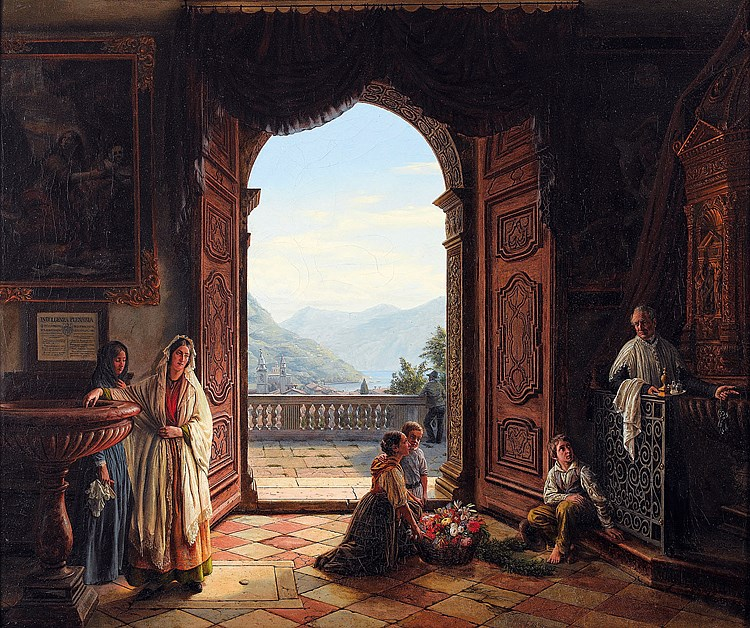
Interior of Lugano Cathedral, built in the 15th century

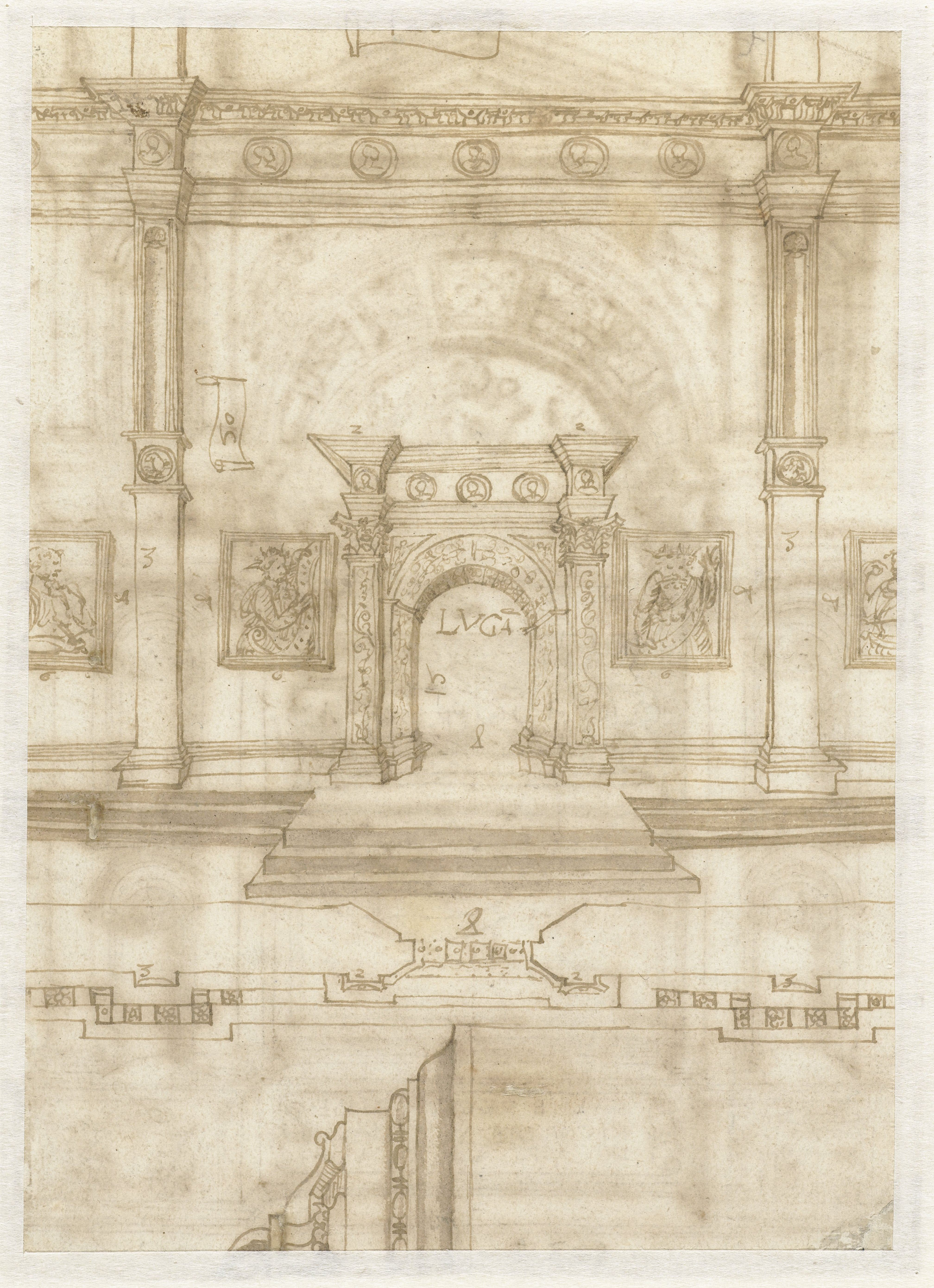
Drawing of the Lugano Cathedral, 1538

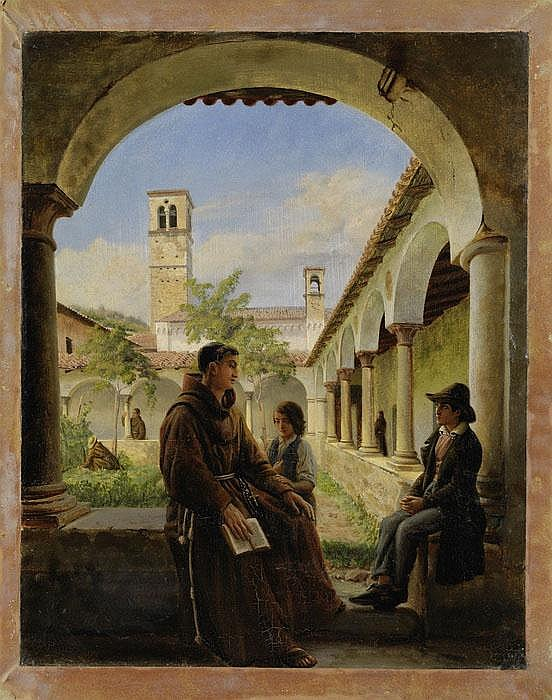
Interior of the Franciscan Monastery, built in the 15th century

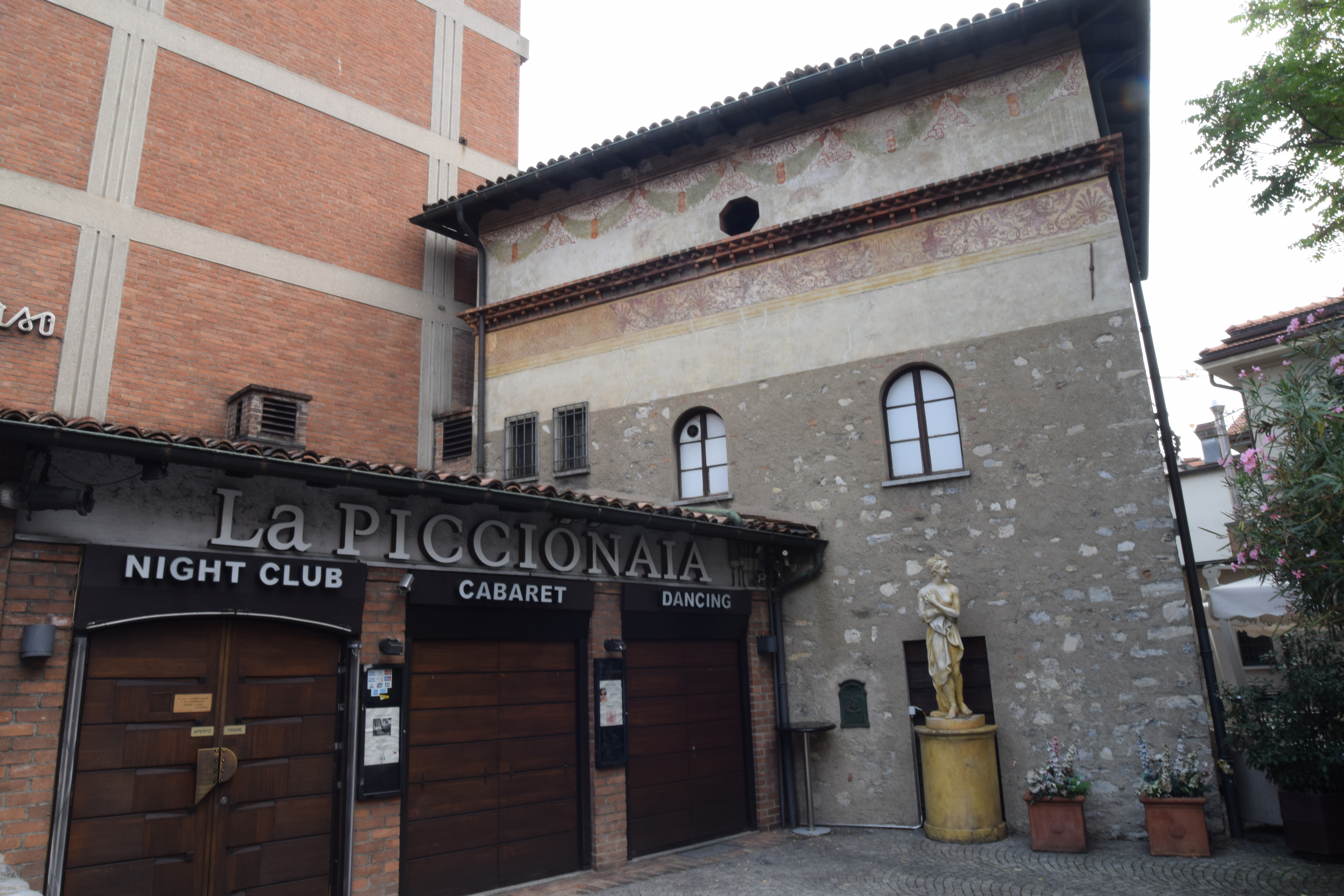
Civic building from the 15th century

Between 1433 and 1438 the Duke of Milan sat as a feudal lord over Lugano. He compensated the Rusca family with the ownership of Locarno. Under the reign of his heirs in the following decades rebellions and riots broke out, which lasted until the French invasion of 1499. Shortly before that invasion, Ludovico Sforza had the Castello di Lugano built on the plain of the Cassarate; the Old Swiss Confederacy besieged it twice and began demolishing it in 1517.

=== Lugano as a dependency of the Old Swiss Confederacy ===
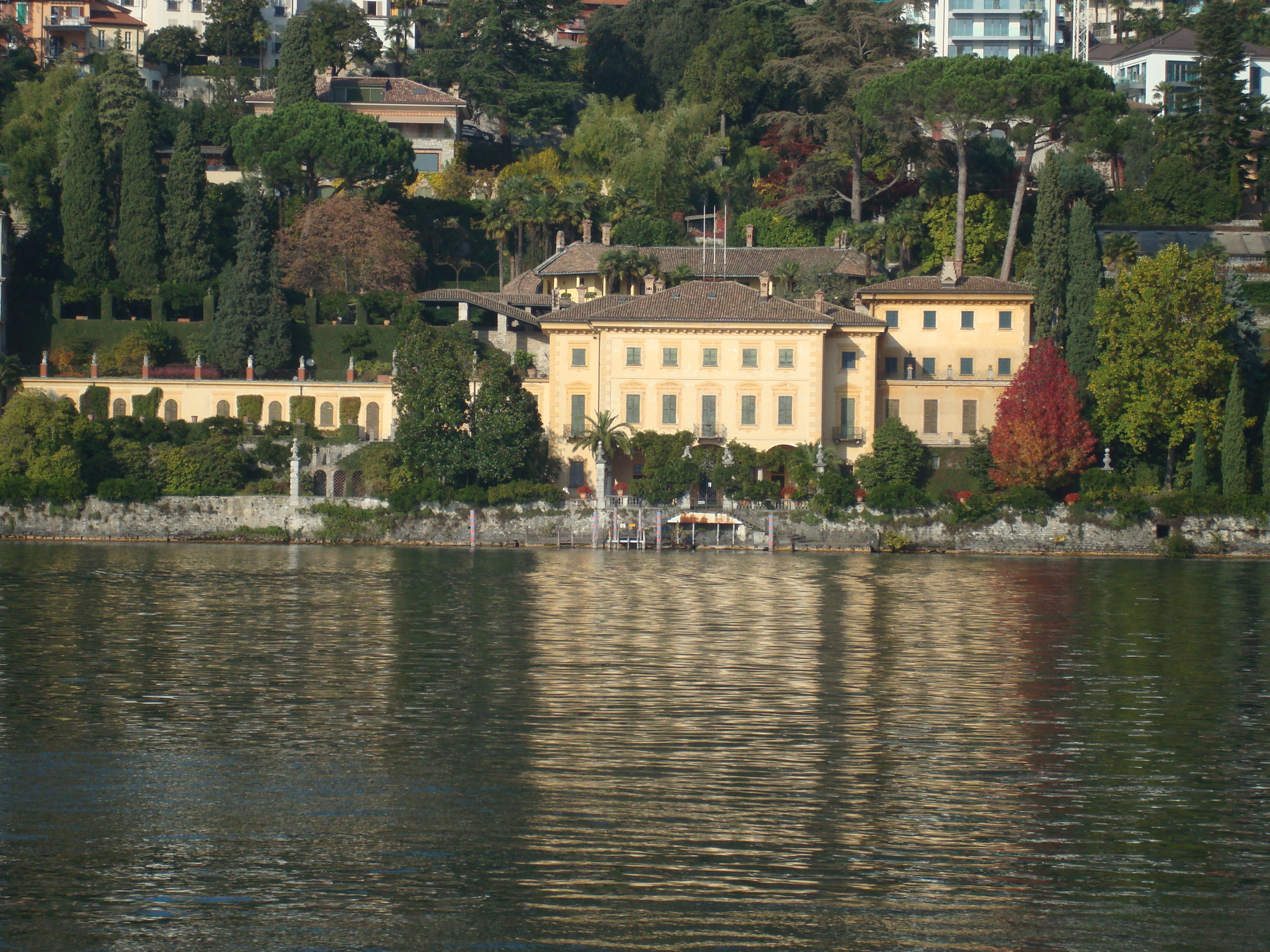
Villa Favorita, built in 1687 for Karl Konrad von Beroldingen

Lugano was the object of continuous disputes between the sovereigns of Como and Milan, in particular by the powerful dynasties of the Visconti (rulers of Milan) and the Rusca (rulers of Como), until it became a Swiss dominion in 1513.

An important name in this period was that of the von Beroldingen, a noble family from Uri, whose members between 1576 and 1798 served as chancellors of the Vogt residing in Lugano. A key member of this family was Karl Konrad von Beroldingen (1624–1706), who served as Lugano's chancellor and general captain, serving also Spain, and receiving the title of Baron from Leopold I in 1691. He commissioned the construction of Palazzo Beroldingen, on the site of the current Parco Ciani, and Villa Favorita, in Castagnola.

=== Lugano during the Enlightenment ===
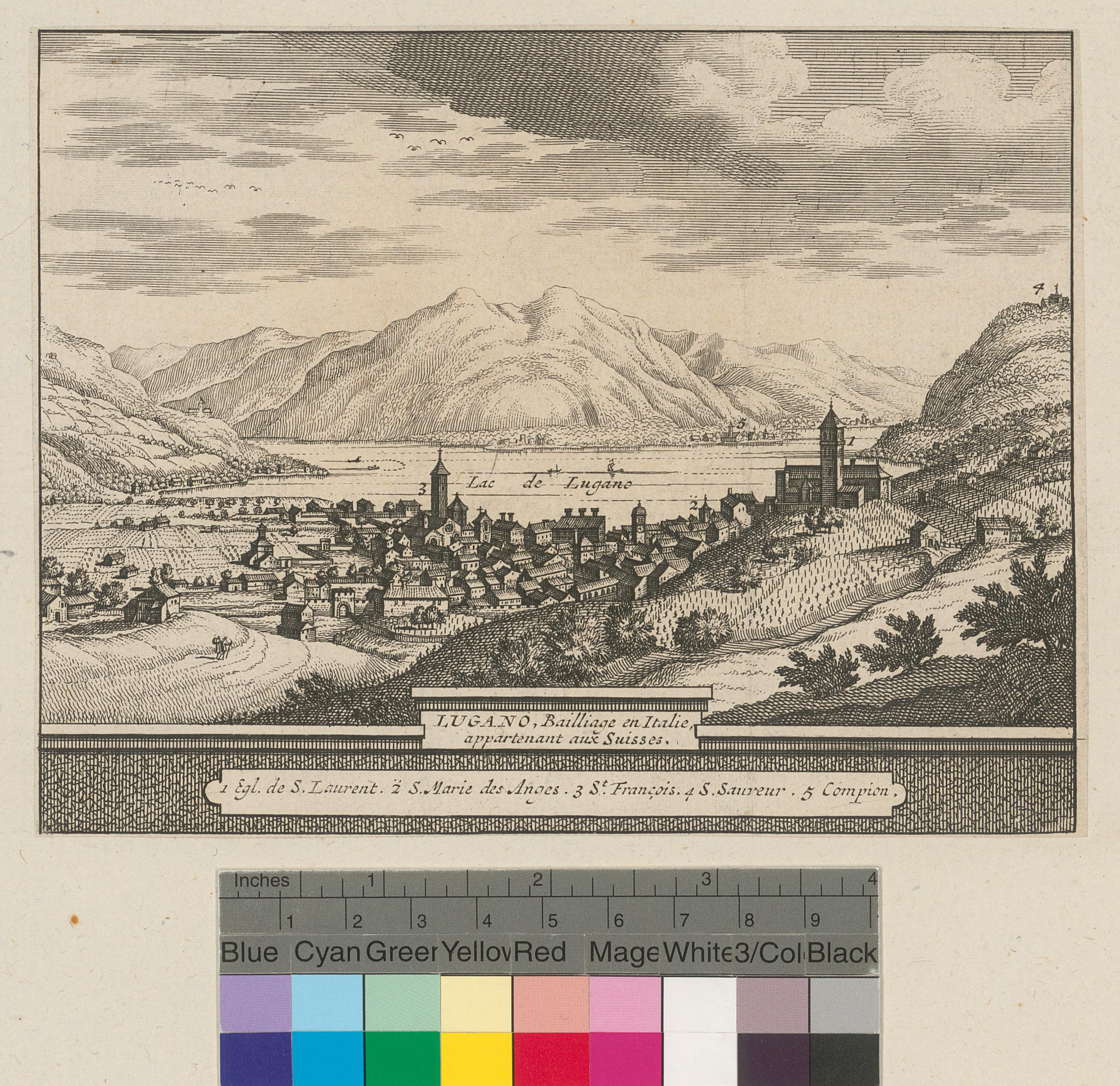
View after 1714

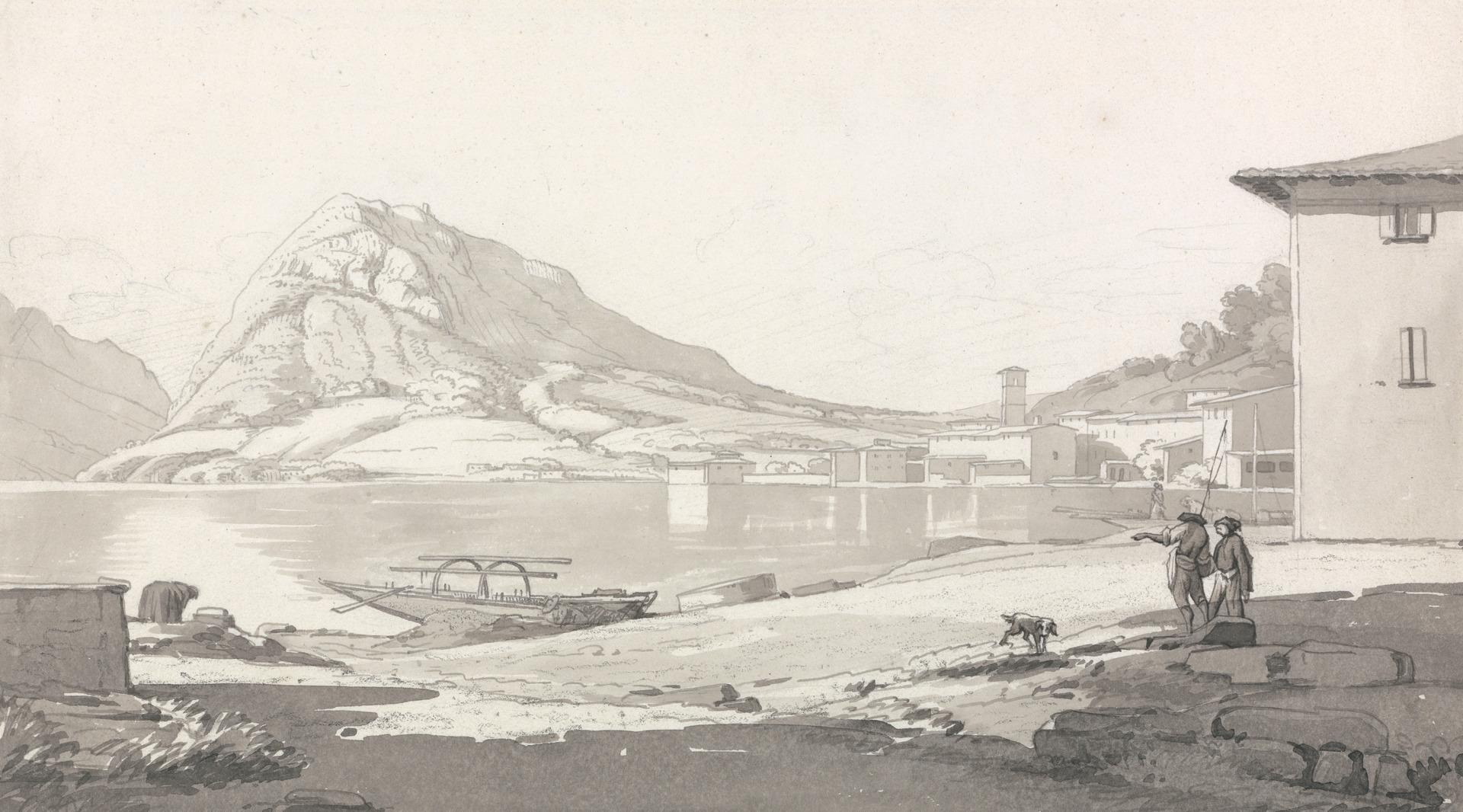
View in the mid-18th century

View in 1790

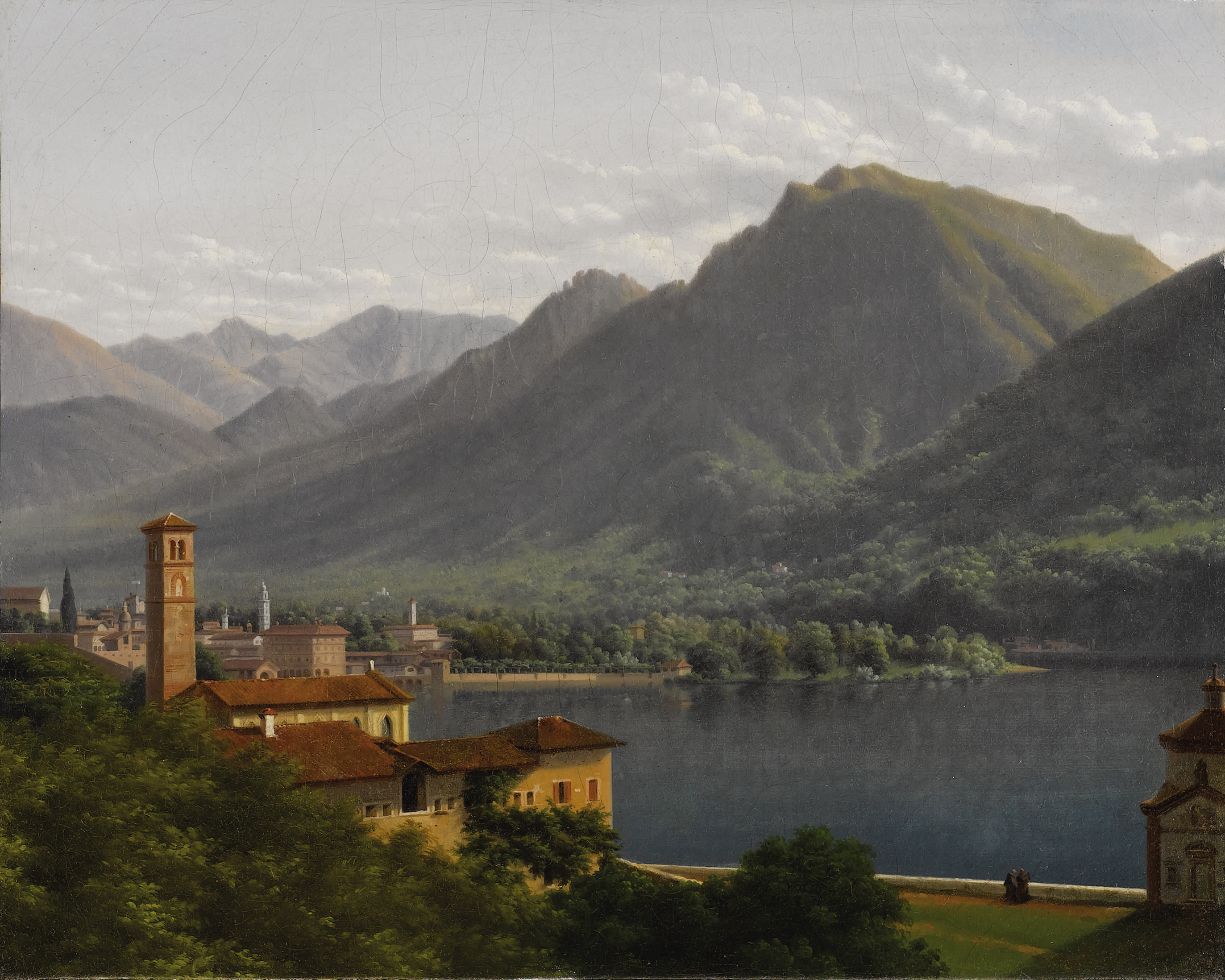
View in the late 18th century

In 1746, the Agnelli brothers opened the first printing press and bookshop in Lugano. They began publishing the newspaper Nuove di diverse corti e paesi in 1748 and changed its name to Gazzetta di Lugano in 1797. The newspaper was widely read in north and central Italy. It supported the cause of the later Jansenists against the Jesuits and therefore was banned in 1768 in the territory of the Papal States. It was open to the themes of enlightened reform and the American Revolutionary War. It was the first newspaper in the Italian language to publish an excerpt from the Declaration of Independence of 1776. After the death of Abbot Gian Battista Agnelli in 1788, who had been the editor for more than 40 years, Abbot Giuseppe Lodovico Maria Vanelli took over the paper. Under Abbot Vanelli, it supported the revolutionary ideas from France, which drew protests from the Austrian government in Lombardy. The publication of the magazine ceased abruptly after edition number 17 of 29 April 1799, following the anti-French riots in Lugano during which the Agnelli printing house was sacked and Abbot Vanelli was shot.

Swiss control lasted until 1798 when Napoleon conquered the Old Swiss Confederation and created the Helvetic Republic, within which Lugano became the capital of the Canton of Lugano.

=== Canton of Lugano ===
The canton of Lugano unified the former Landvogteien of Lugano, Mendrisio, Locarno and Valmaggia. However, as with the other cantons of the Helvetic Republic, the autonomy of Lugano was very limited, the republic having been founded by Napoleon in order further to centralise power in Switzerland. The canton was led by a Directory of five members, who appointed a "national préfet".

The canton was deeply divided between "patriots" supporting the Cisalpine Republic, and traditionalist "aristocrats". By 1799 riots broke out in Lugano, and the second préfet, Francesco Capra, fled the town. Power passed to a provisional government sympathetic to the Habsburgs. However, French occupation was restored in 1800. Discontent continued and in early 1802 a revolt in Capriasca led to the autumn pronunciamento of Pian Povrò, which declared the independence of Lugano from the Helvetic client republic.

With the Act of Mediation, the following year, political agitation was finally quelled, as were the struggles between unionists and federalists. The canton of Lugano merged with Bellinzona creating the canton of Ticino, which endures to the present day.

=== Lugano in the early 19th century ===
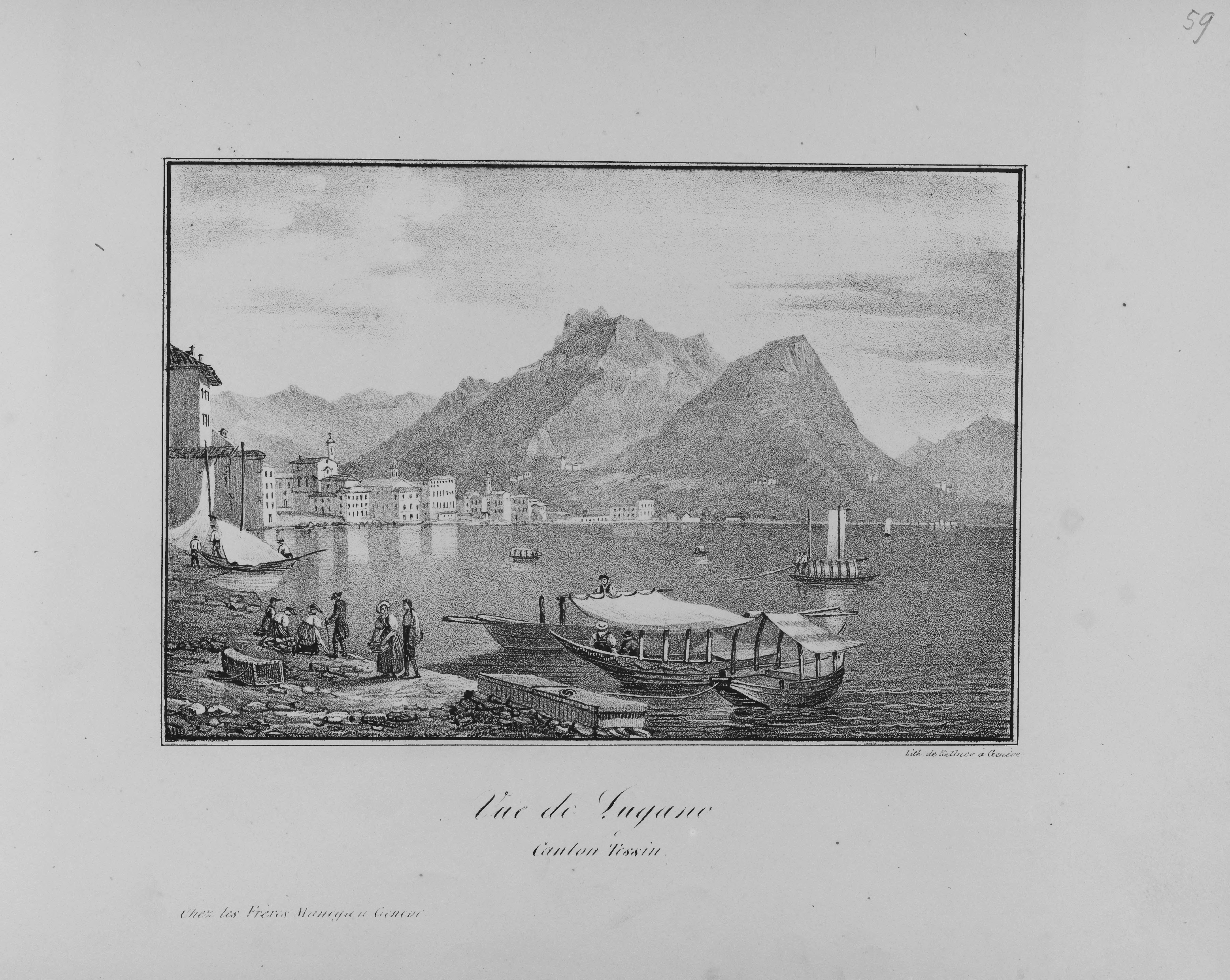
Early 19th-century view

View in 1815

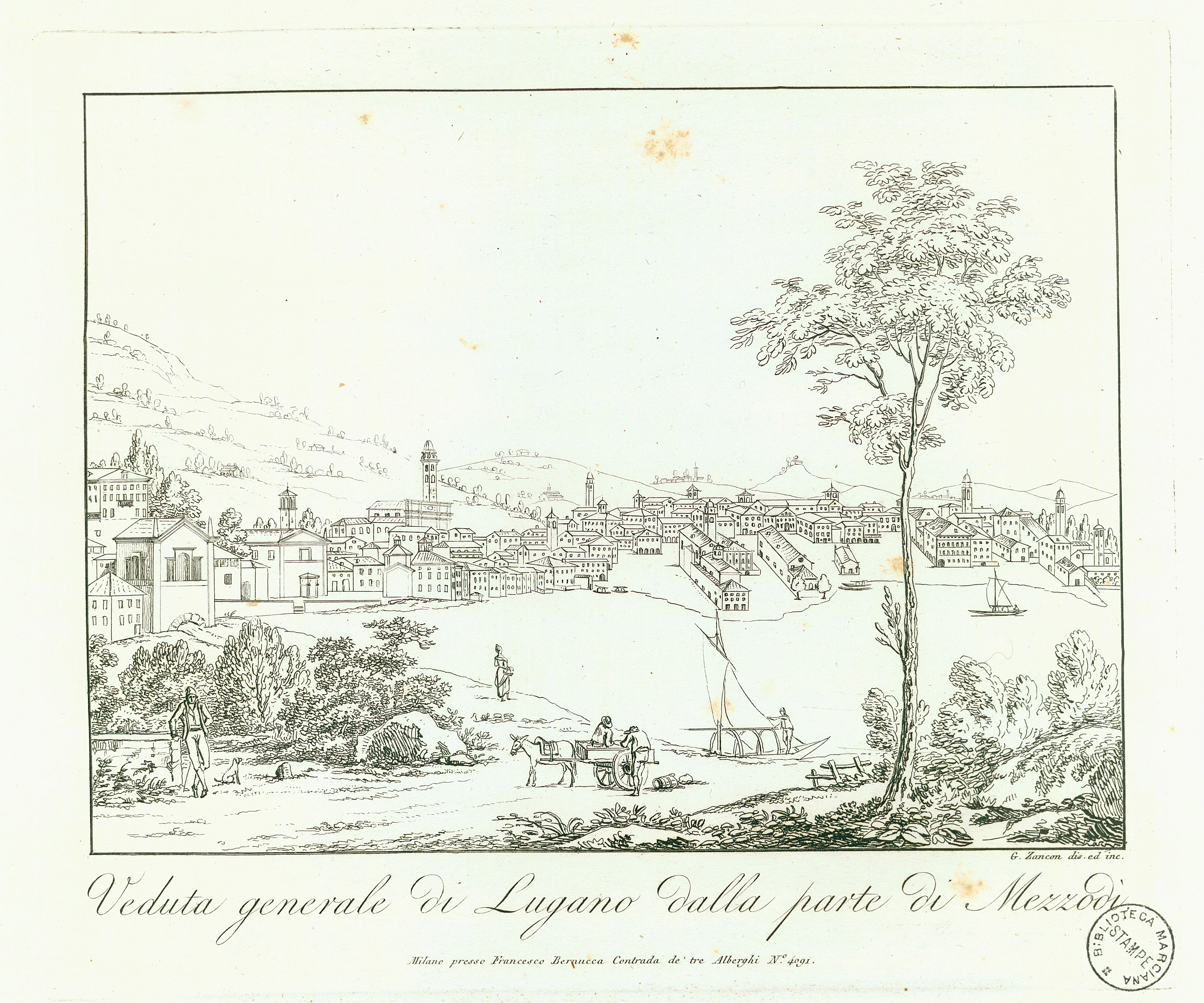
View of Lugano in 1823

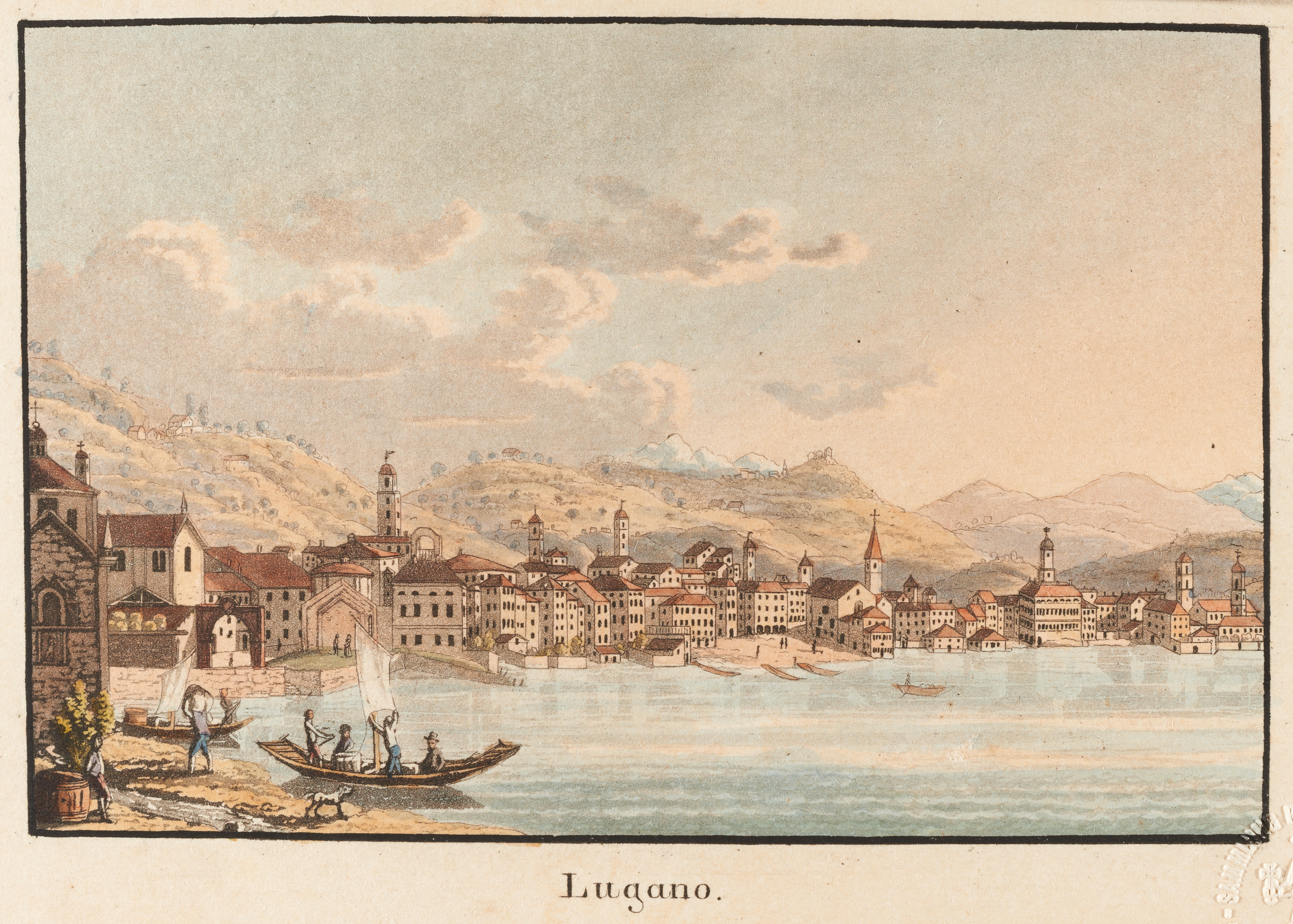
Early 19th-century view

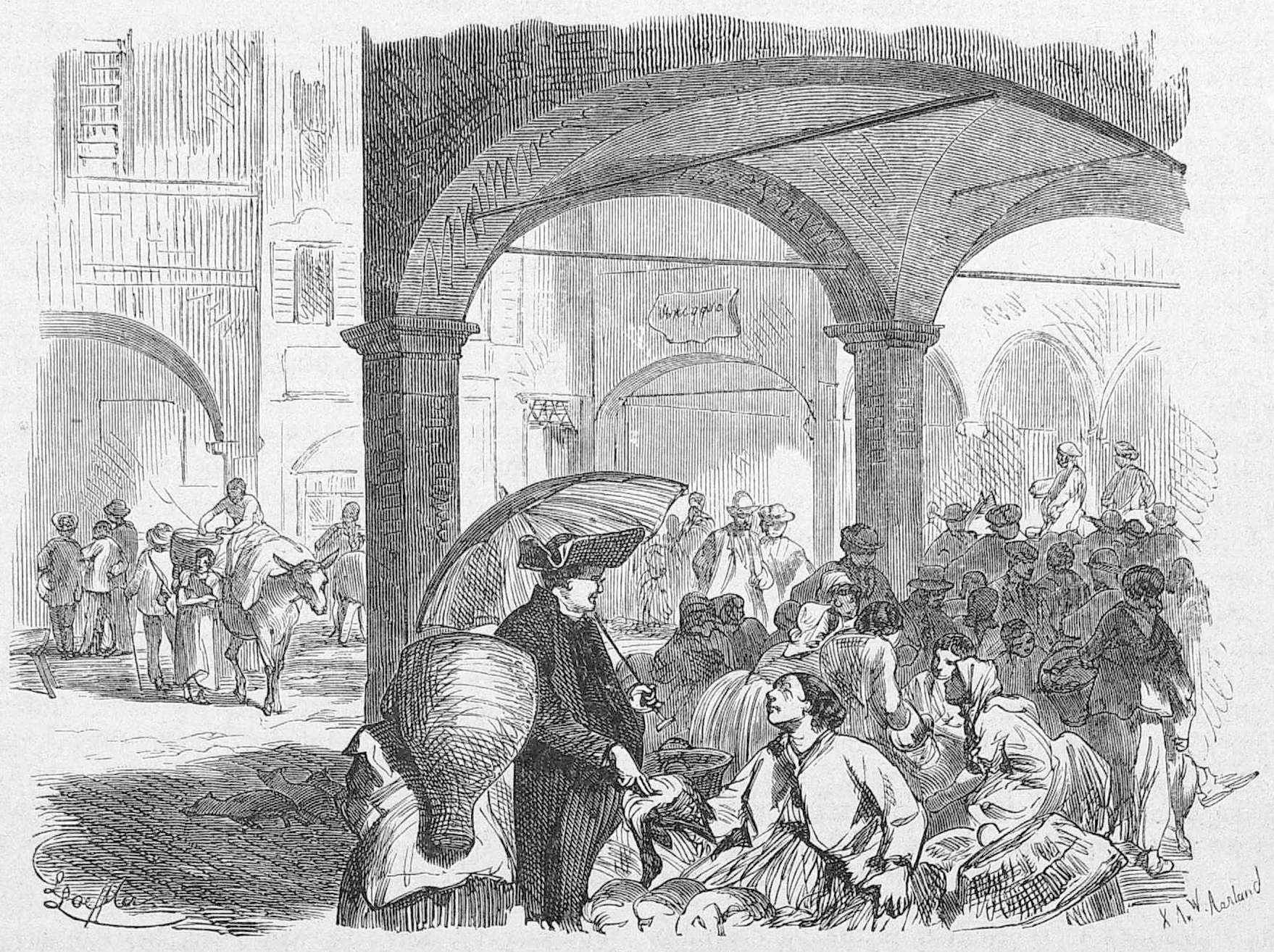
View of the market in 1867

After 1803, the political municipality of Lugano was created. One of the primary tasks of the new city government was to determine the division of property and authority between the patriziato and the new political municipality. Two agreements between the two organizations, in 1804 and 1810, began this process. In the second half of the 19th century, the political municipality received various properties and rights from the patriziato. Francesco Capra, the préfet during the Helvetic Republic, became the first mayor of Lugano from 1803 until 1813. The cantonal constitution of 1814, set Lugano, Bellinzona and Locarno as capitals of the Canton. They each served as the capital in a six-year rotation. Lugano was the capital in 1827–33, 1845–51 and 1863–69.

In the 19th century, the city government was dominated by the Liberal Party. In 1900, slightly more than half of the seats on the city council (at the time 50 total members, but 60 members since 2004) were held by Liberals. Most of the rest of the seats were held by either Conservatives or Socialists.

The city government initially had eleven members, but in 1908 their number was reduced to five and in 2004 increased to seven. Throughout most of the 20th century, the Liberals held the absolute majority here as well. The rest of the municipal executive posts were held by the Conservatives, the Socialists (1944–48, 1976–80 and since 2000) and the Ticino League (since 1992).

Around 1830 new civic and government buildings began to emerge in Lugano. The town also began to expand into the surrounding hills, along the Cassarate, and toward Molino Nuovo, Paradiso and Castagnola. In 1843–44 the city hall was built on the site of the Bishop's Palace (built in 1346). It housed the cantonal government in 1845–51 and again in 1863–69. Since 1890, it has housed the city government. The promenade was built in stages: the first part was in the 1870s, the second in the first decade of the 20th century. In the first decades of the 19th century, the roads that connect Lugano with Bellinzona (1808–12), Ponte Tresa (1808–20) and Chiasso (1810–16) were built. In 1848 the first steamboat on Lake Lugano began to operate, with regular, scheduled service since 1856.

=== Modernization of the city ===
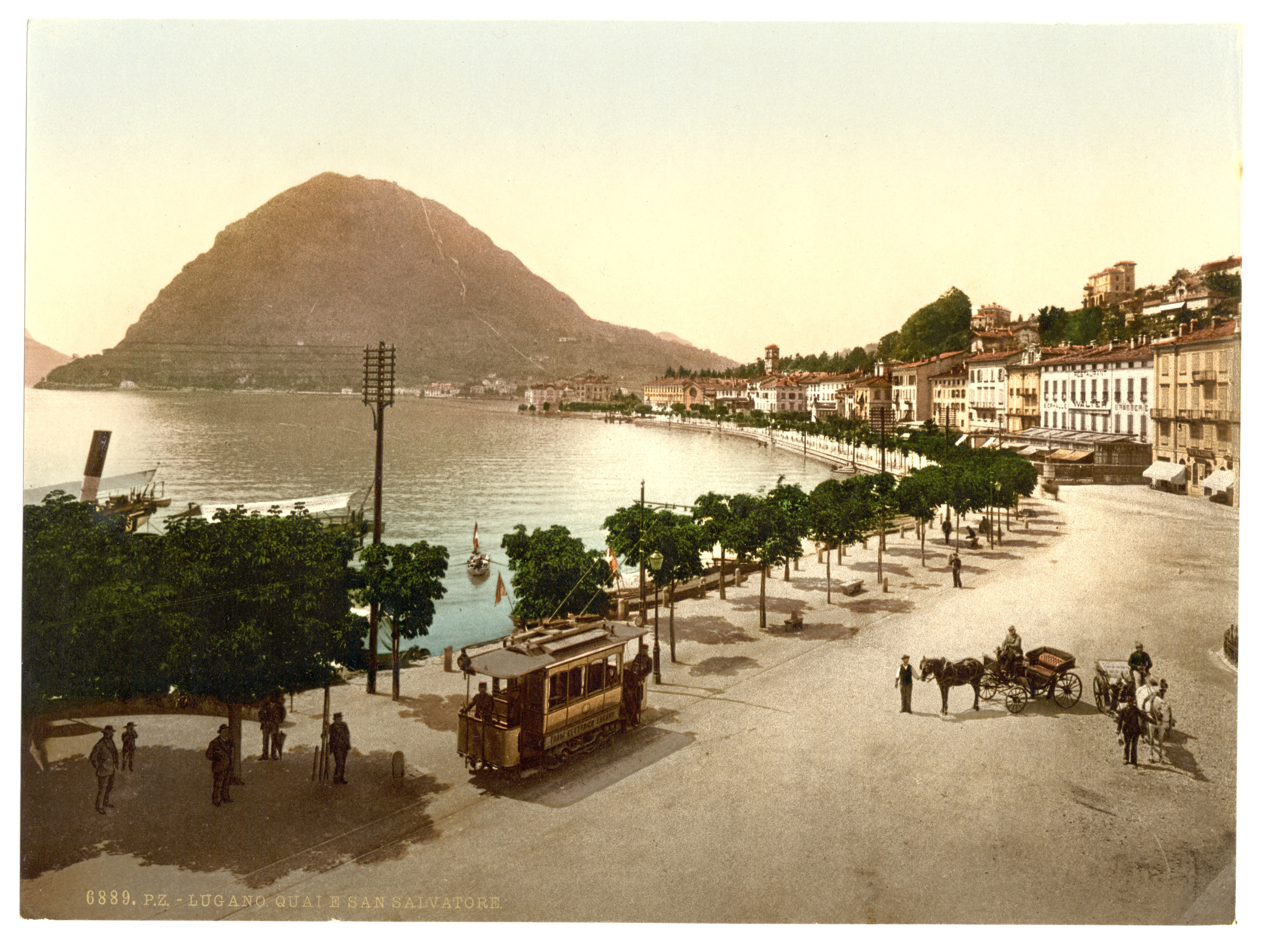
Late 19th-century view

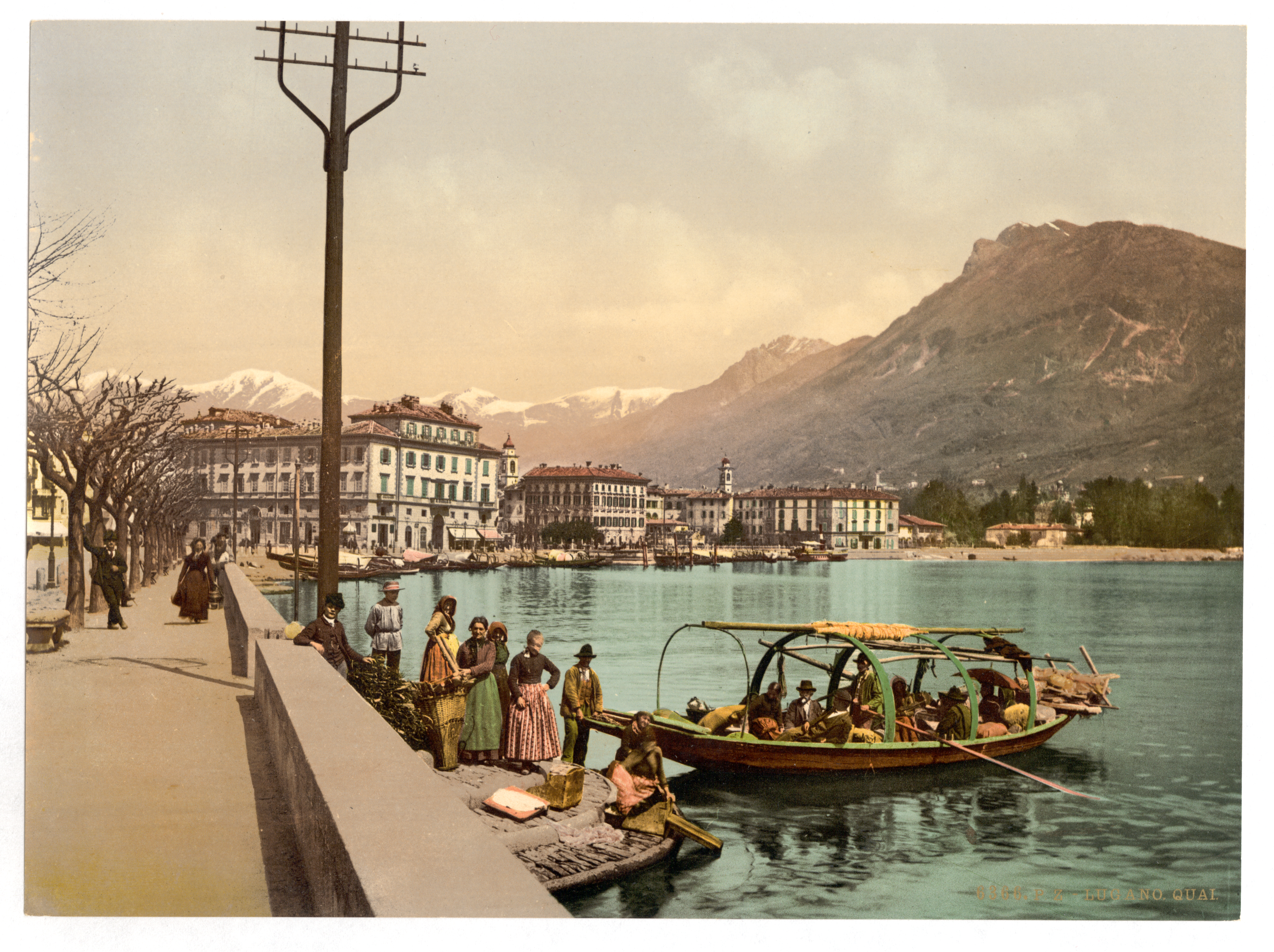
Late 19th-century view

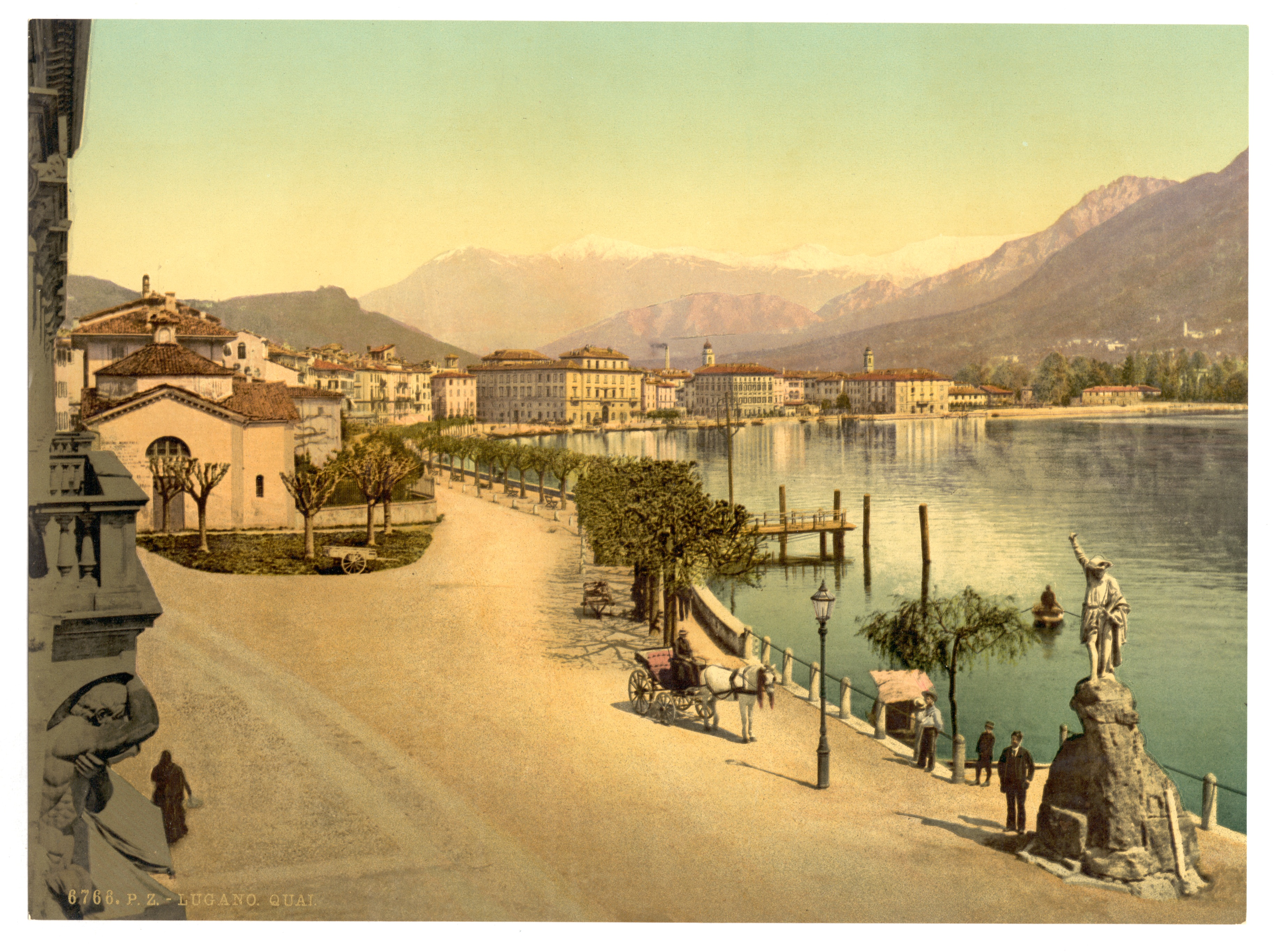
Late 19th-century view

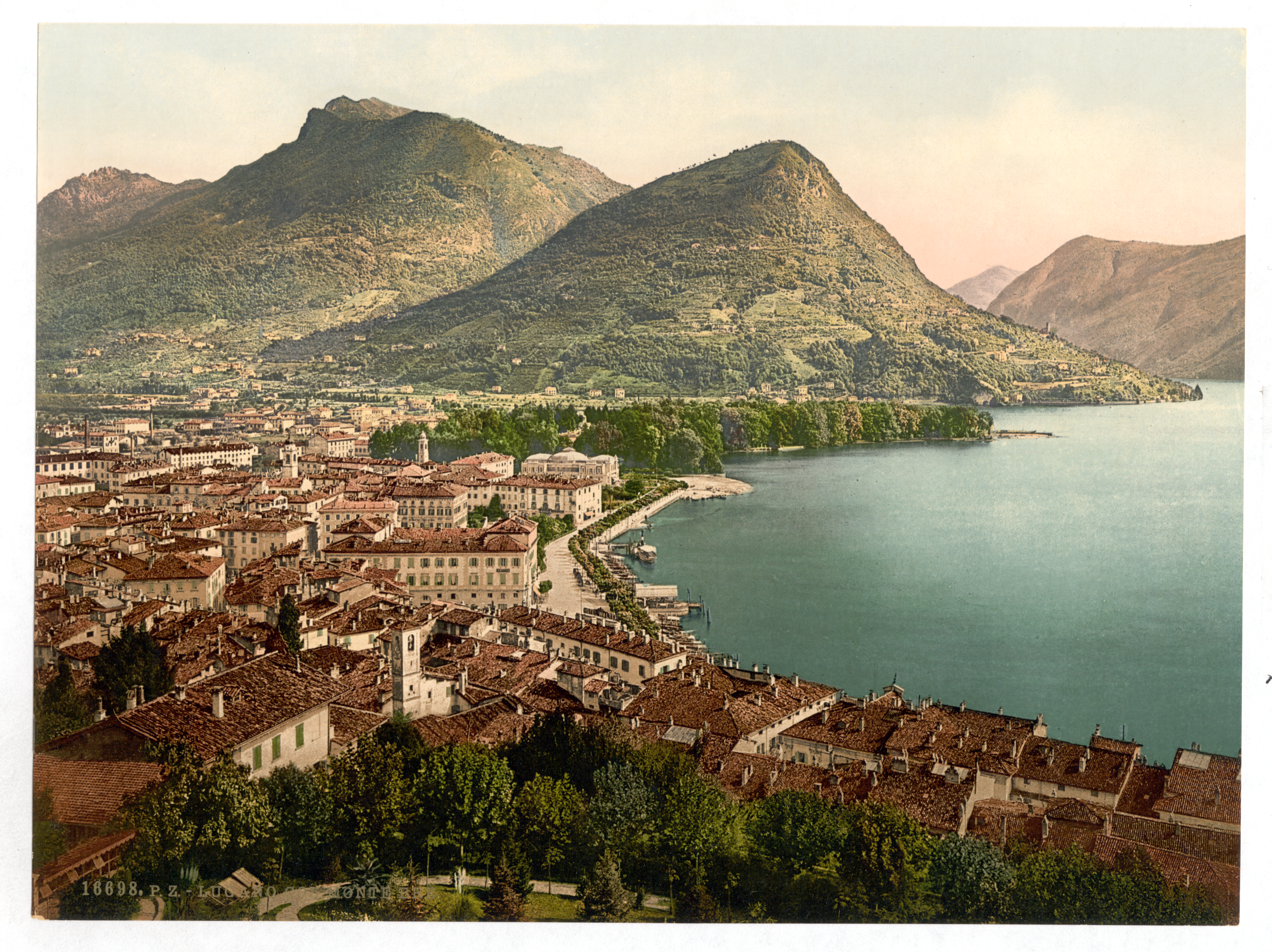
Late 19th-century view

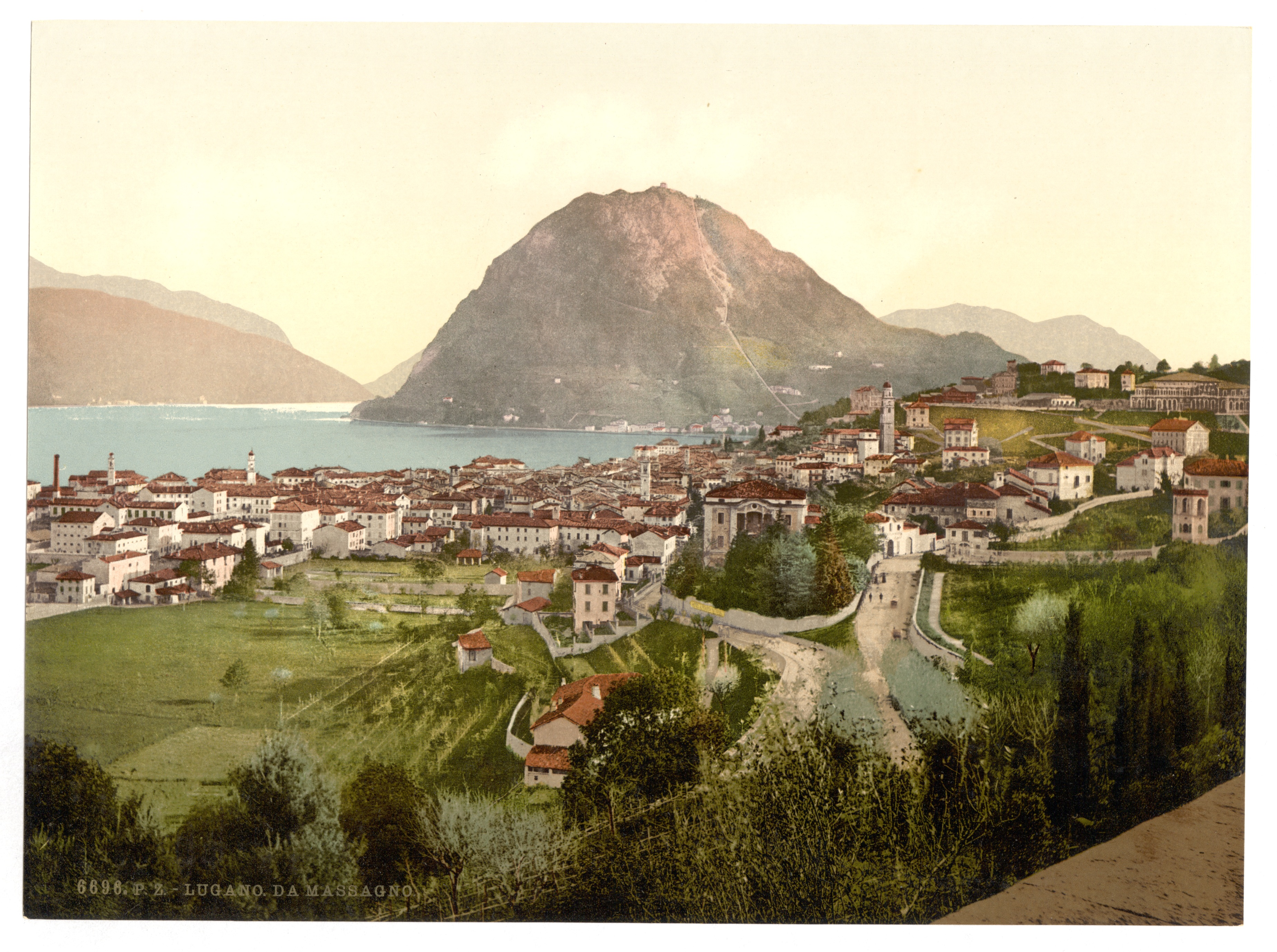
Late 19th-century view

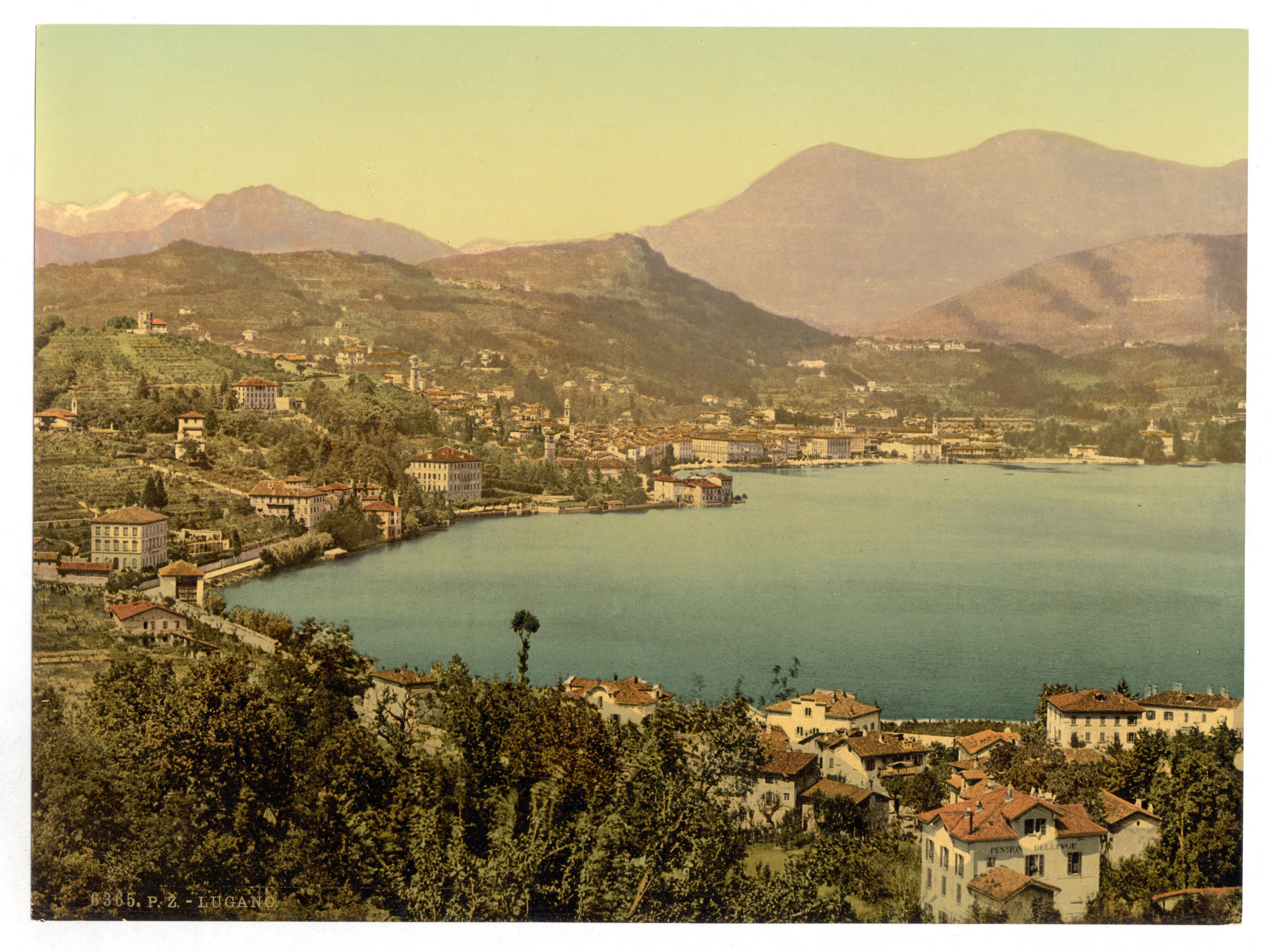
Late 19th-century view

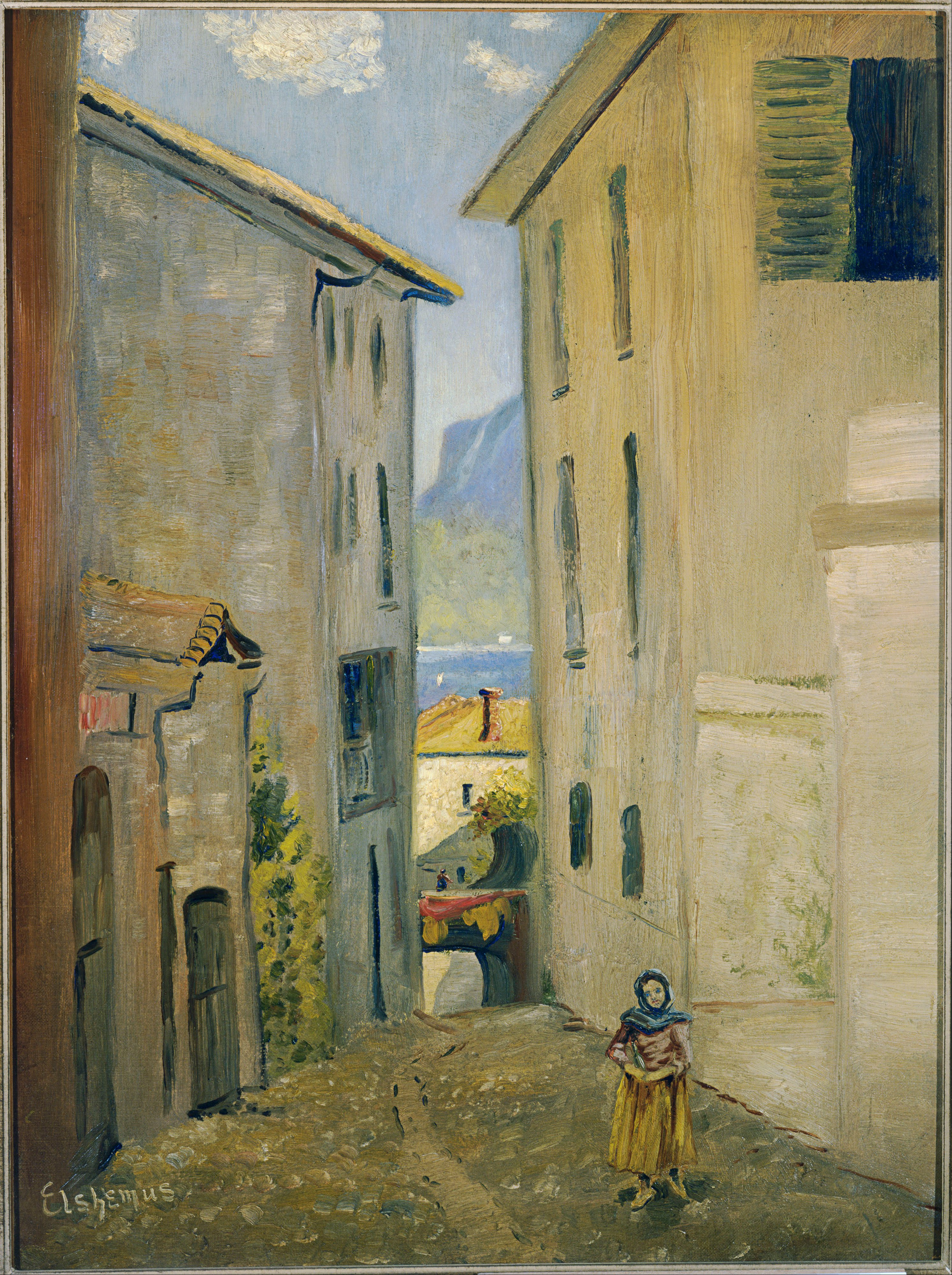
View of a street in 1893

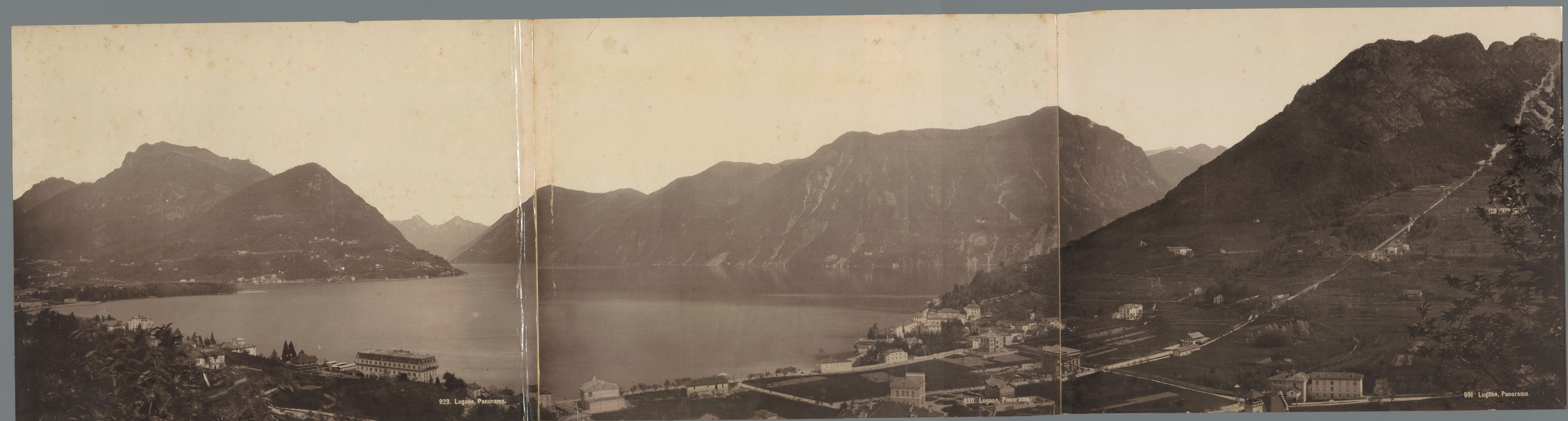
Late 19th-century panorama

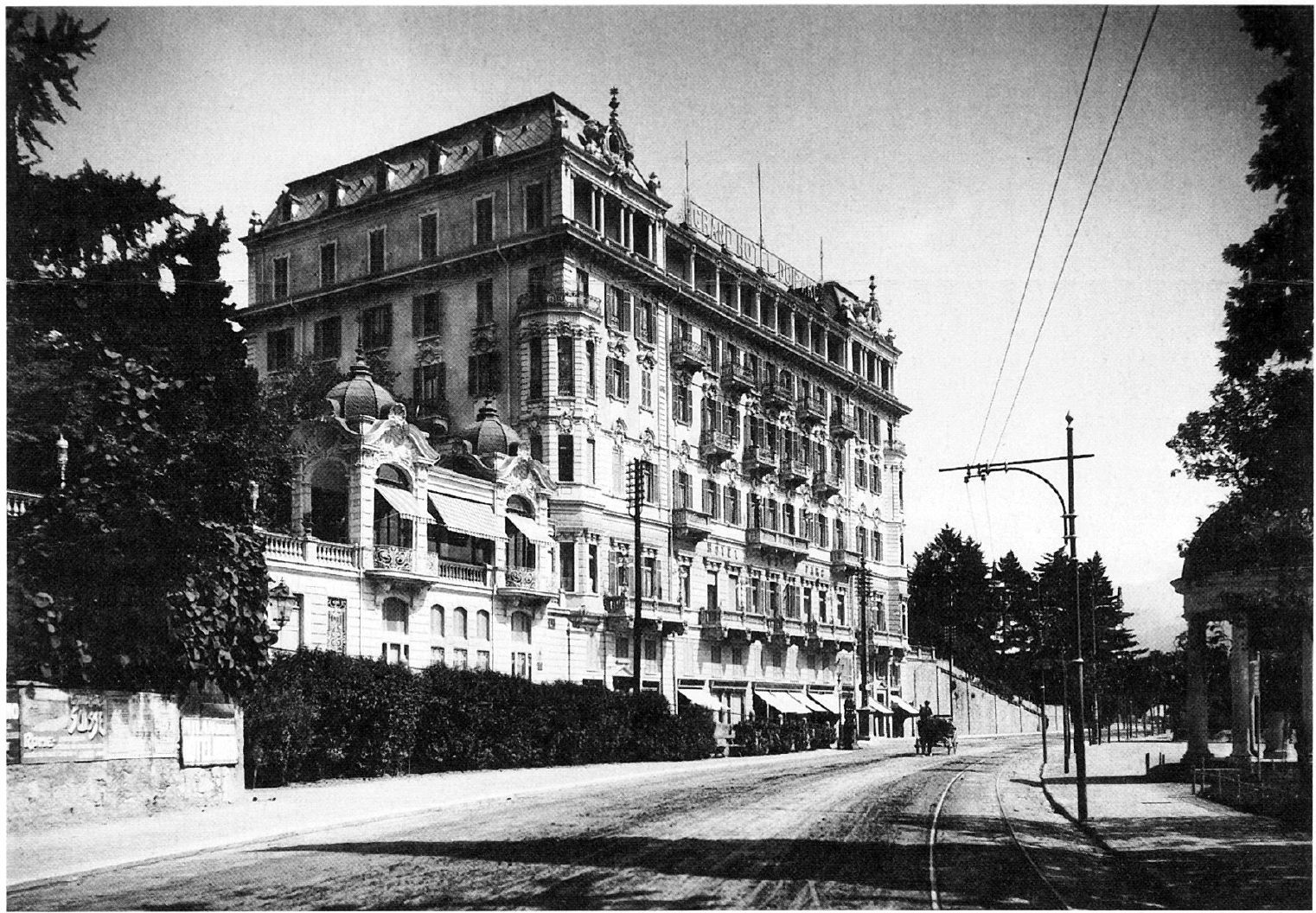
Hôtel Du Parc et Beau-Sejour, 1904–1905

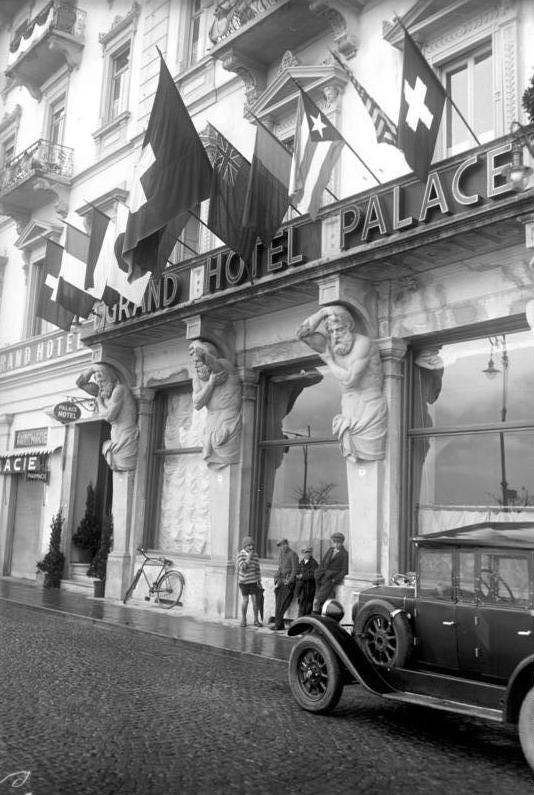
Grand Hôtel Palace in 1928

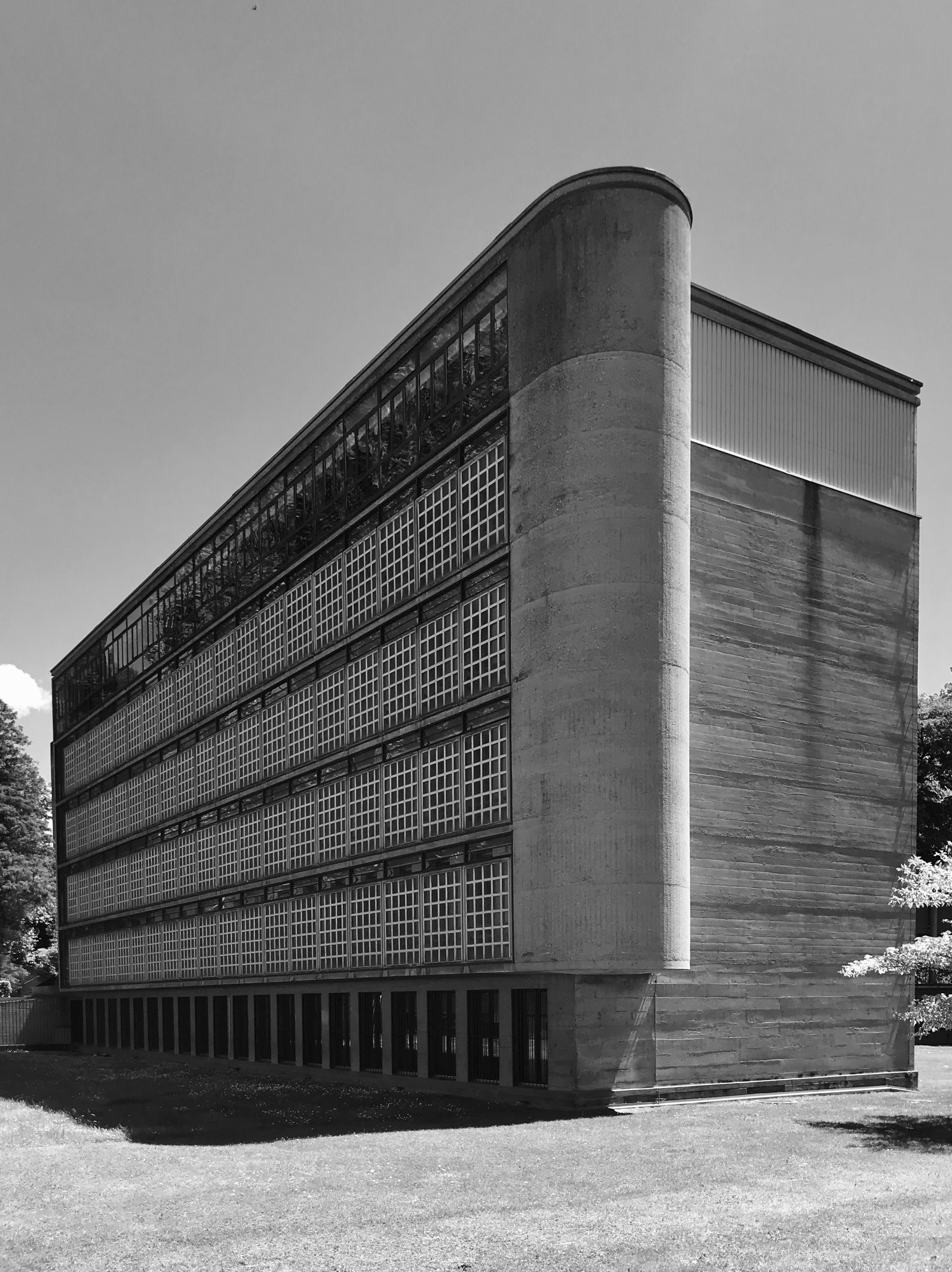
Library built in the 1940s

The construction of the Melide causeway between Melide and Bissone in 1844–47 favoured the development of the Chiasso-Bellinzona-Lugano-Gotthard line at the expense of the north–south route along Lake Maggiore. This tendency for development was strengthened further in 1882 with the completion of the Gotthard railway line. The railway station was built in 1874–77 in Lugano, and transformed it into one of the main links between northern Italy and central and northern Europe, which led to the development of tourism and in general, helped the services sector.

From the mid-19th century to 1970 the city recorded consistent population growth, especially between 1880 and 1910, when the population more than doubled. This increase was partly due to foreign nationals settling in Lugano (in 1870 18.7% of the population, 1910 43.6%) and people from other language areas of Switzerland (1870 1.4% of the population, 1910 6.9%). In the last three decades of the 20th century, the population fell slightly, despite the merger in 1972, of the municipalities of Castagnola and Brè-Aldesago. This reflected a trend to move away from the centre to the suburban communities.

However, in 2004 the municipalities of Breganzona, Cureggia, Davesco-Soragno, Gandria, Pambio-Noranco, Pazzallo, Pregassona and Viganello were incorporated into the municipality and followed by Barbengo, Carabbia and Villa Luganese in 2008. This, among other factors, resulted in a doubling of the population to 52,059 in 2006, of which over a third were foreigners. In 2013 the municipalities of Bogno, Cadro, Carona, Certara, Cimadera, Sonvico and Val Colla were incorporated into the municipality.

=== Postwar Lugano ===
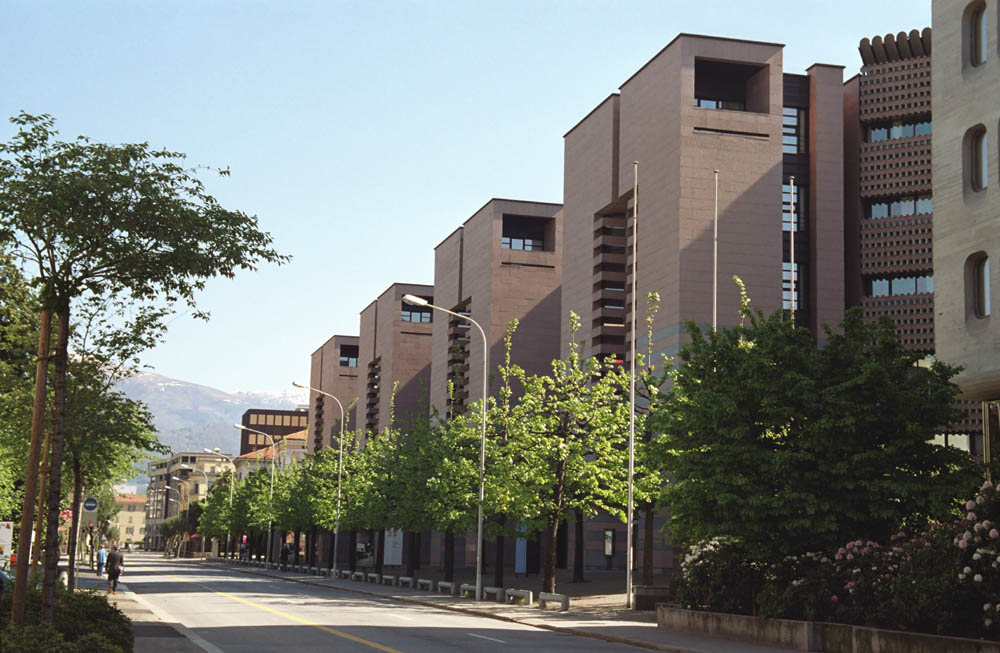
Banca del Gottardo designed by Mario Botta in the 1980s

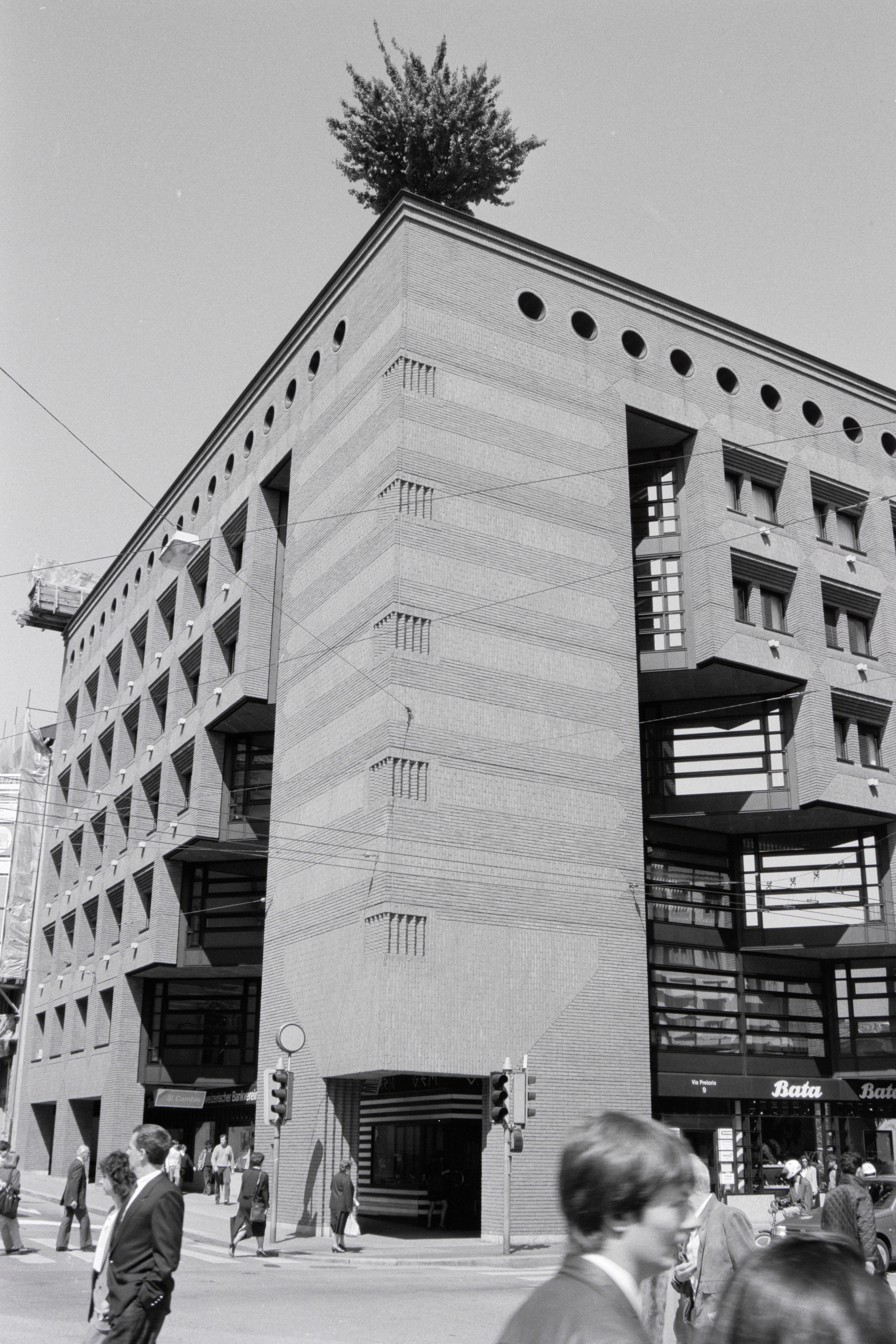
Edificio Ransila I designed by Mario Botta

Following the Second World War, and particularly during the 1960s and 70s, thanks to an abundant flow of capital from nearby Italy, Lugano experienced a period of exponential growth in banking activities which led to it placing itself as the third financial centre of Switzerland, with over 100 banking institutions present in the city. Trade, tourism and finance are the mainstays of the local economy. In 2000, nine-tenths of the workers were employed in the services sector, of which three-quarters were commuters, including many cross-border commuters (13% of the working population).

Lugano was the host city of the 1956 Eurovision Song Contest, the first-ever edition of the contest. In 1975, the Congress Center was built followed in 1978 by the new City Hospital. In 1963 the city acquired the land for the airfield Lugano-Agno, and the first scheduled flights was in 1980. At the beginning of the 21st century they began the Grande Lugano projects, including: the car tunnel Vedeggio-Cassarate, which started in 2005 and connects the A2 motorway with the neighbourhood of Cornaredo, the creation of a new Kulturpol on the site of the former Grand Hôtel Palace and a convention and exhibition centre in the area of Campo Marzio.

=== Israeli replication ===
In June 2011, officials of the Israeli town of Yehud announced they would undertake a massive construction project to replicate Lugano's old square in the centre of their town, to reinvigorate commerce and tourism. The replica will be replete with neoclassical columns and colonnades.

== Geography ==
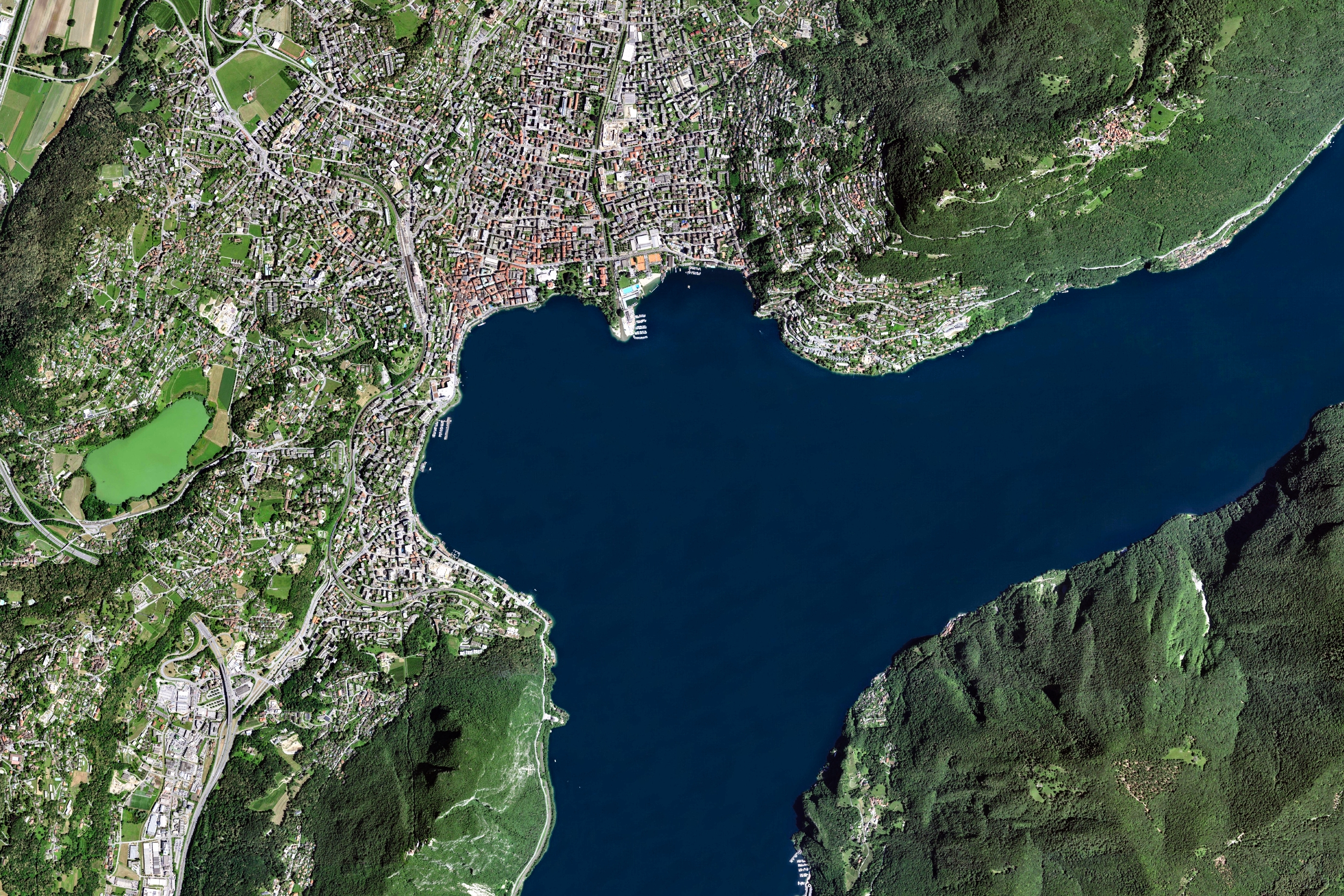
Lugano and its bay

The municipality Lugano lies at the edge of Lake Lugano (Italian: Lago di Lugano or Ceresio), which is situated between the lakes Lago Maggiore and Lago di Como, south of the Alps. It lies at the heart of the Sottoceneri, that part of the canton of Ticino that lies south of the Monte Ceneri Pass.

The city centre is located on the lake shore just to the west of where the river Cassarate enters the lake. The city's waterfront forms a crescent around the bay between the Brè (925 m[3,035 ft]) and the San Salvatore (912 m[2,992 ft]) mountains.

Because of the historical development of the city, incorporating some relatively distant suburbs but leaving other, nearer, suburbs as independent municipalities, the borders of the city are disparate. A large and sparsely populated section of the city is on the east bank of Lake Lugano and separated from the city by that lake. Similarly, the inner-urban but independent municipality of Paradiso is a near-enclave, totally surrounded as it is by the municipality and Lake Lugano.

Based on the 1997 land survey, as of 2013 the municipality Lugano has a total area of 32.09 square kilometres (12.39 square miles). Of this area, 3.25 km^{2} (1.25 sq mi) or 10.1% is used for agricultural purposes, while 6.73 km^{2} (2.60 sq mi) or 21.0% is forested. Of the rest of the land, 4.48 km^{2} (1.73 sq mi) or 14.0% is settled (buildings or roads), 0.04 km^{2} (9.9 acres) or 0.1% is either rivers or lakes and 0.12 km^{2} (30 acres) or 0.4% is unproductive land.

Of the built-up area, housing and buildings made up 9.4% and transportation infrastructure made up 3.0%. while parks, green belts and sports fields made up 1.2%. Out of the forested land, all of the forested land area is covered with heavy forests. Of the agricultural land, 0.5% is used for growing crops and 9.4% is used for alpine pastures. Almost all the water in the municipality is in lakes.

=== Climate ===
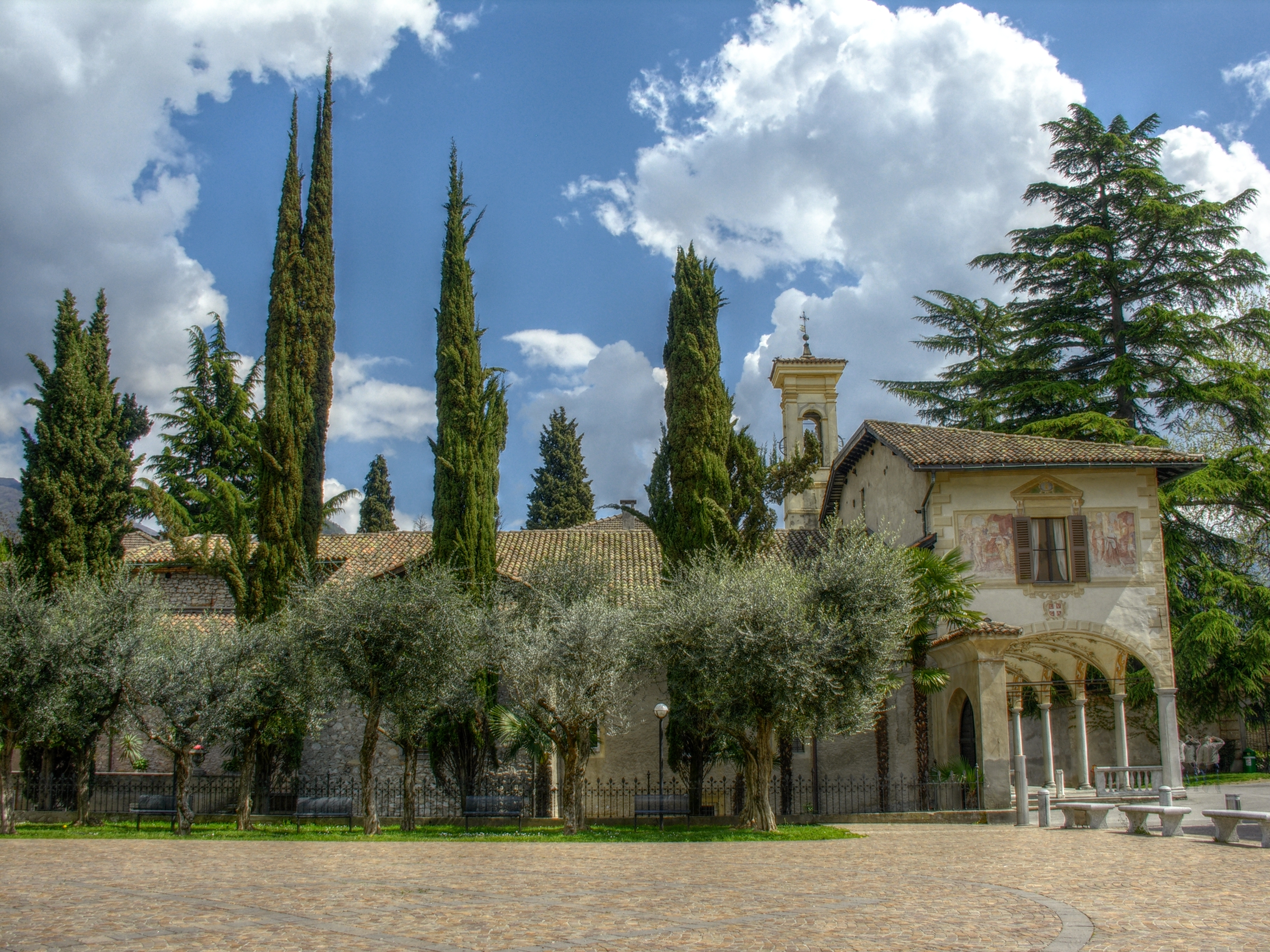
Cypresses and olive trees at the Santa Maria di Loreto Church

Lugano is amongst the warmest places in Switzerland, along with Locarno and Grono. Lugano has a humid subtropical climate (Köppen: Cfa) due to the warmer average being above 22 °C (71.6 °F). The vegetation is from the subtropics with deciduous forest. It is characterized by relatively mild winters and warm humid summers. It has an average of 98.1 days of rain or snow per year and on average receives 1,559 mm (61.4 in) of precipitation. The wettest month is May during which Lugano receives an average of 196 mm (7.7 in) of rain, while the driest month of the year is February with an average of 52 mm (2.0 in) of precipitation over 4.6 days.

Located on a plain in southern Switzerland and protected by the Alps and lakes, the climate is one of the mildest in the country, typical of the Italian Lakes in the Insubrian region. Precipitation is abundant throughout the year, while temperature fluctuations remain moderate. Lugano is also one of the sunniest Swiss cities. The heaviest rainfall tends to occur just before and just after the summer months. January typically has around 27 to 28 nights below freezing, though severe cold is rare and does not occur every year. Much of the summer is pleasant, but warm days above 30 °C (86 °F) are not uncommon (average of about 8 days). It usually snows every winter, but often a single snowfall doesn't leave more than 50 cm on the ground. Heavier snowfalls or blizzards are possible but not very common.

The highest temperature recorded in Lugano is 38.0 °C (100.4 °F), recorded in July 1945, with the lowest temperature recorded being −20.4 °C (−4.7 °F), recorded in February 1929.

Climate data for Lugano (coast of Lake Lugano), elevation: 273 m (896 ft), 1991–2020 normals, extremes 1901–present
Month	Jan	Feb	Mar	Apr	May	Jun	Jul	Aug	Sep	Oct	Nov	Dec	Year
Record high °C (°F)	23.1 (73.6)	25.0 (77.0)	27.3 (81.1)	31.6 (88.9)	32.6 (90.7)	36.2 (97.2)	38.0 (100.4)	36.4 (97.5)	36.0 (96.8)	28.9 (84.0)	22.8 (73.0)	21.4 (70.5)	38.0 (100.4)
Mean daily maximum °C (°F)	7.1 (44.8)	9.0 (48.2)	13.5 (56.3)	16.7 (62.1)	20.8 (69.4)	24.9 (76.8)	27.3 (81.1)	26.8 (80.2)	22.1 (71.8)	16.9 (62.4)	11.6 (52.9)	7.7 (45.9)	17.0 (62.6)
Daily mean °C (°F)	3.8 (38.8)	5.0 (41.0)	8.9 (48.0)	12.3 (54.1)	16.3 (61.3)	20.4 (68.7)	22.6 (72.7)	22.1 (71.8)	17.9 (64.2)	13.2 (55.8)	8.4 (47.1)	4.6 (40.3)	13.2 (55.8)
Mean daily minimum °C (°F)	1.2 (34.2)	1.9 (35.4)	5.2 (41.4)	8.5 (47.3)	12.4 (54.3)	16.1 (61.0)	18.0 (64.4)	17.8 (64.0)	14.2 (57.6)	10.2 (50.4)	5.7 (42.3)	2.0 (35.6)	9.4 (48.9)
Record low °C (°F)	−12.5 (9.5)	−20.4 (−4.7)	−7.0 (19.4)	−2.7 (27.1)	0.5 (32.9)	4.2 (39.6)	8.0 (46.4)	6.5 (43.7)	2.0 (35.6)	−2.4 (27.7)	−6.0 (21.2)	−9.6 (14.7)	−20.4 (−4.7)
Average precipitation mm (inches)	65.5 (2.58)	61.3 (2.41)	75.5 (2.97)	138.0 (5.43)	177.6 (6.99)	171.5 (6.75)	157.9 (6.22)	158.2 (6.23)	164.9 (6.49)	149.7 (5.89)	166.6 (6.56)	79.9 (3.15)	1,566.6 (61.68)
Average snowfall cm (inches)	6.0 (2.4)	4.6 (1.8)	1.5 (0.6)	0.0 (0.0)	0.0 (0.0)	0.0 (0.0)	0.0 (0.0)	0.0 (0.0)	0.0 (0.0)	0.0 (0.0)	0.5 (0.2)	8.6 (3.4)	21.2 (8.3)
Average precipitation days (≥ 1.0 mm)	5.3	5.0	6.3	9.9	11.6	10.1	8.2	9.6	8.7	9.2	9.3	6.3	99.5
Average snowy days (≥ 1.0 cm)	0.8	1.0	0.3	0.0	0.0	0.0	0.0	0.0	0.0	0.0	0.2	1.2	3.5
Average relative humidity (%)	70	66	62	66	69	68	66	69	72	78	74	70	69
Mean monthly sunshine hours	123.8	142.3	191.8	182.2	199.9	228.8	260.3	244.5	192.1	141.3	105.4	107.3	2,119.7
Percentage possible sunshine	56	57	57	51	51	59	66	65	57	48	46	53	56
Source 1: NOAA
Source 2: MeteoSwissKNMI

Climate data for Lugano (coast of Lake Lugano), elevation: 273 m (896 ft), 1961-1990 normals and extremes
Month	Jan	Feb	Mar	Apr	May	Jun	Jul	Aug	Sep	Oct	Nov	Dec	Year
Record high °C (°F)	21.9 (71.4)	18.0 (64.4)	23.4 (74.1)	25.7 (78.3)	28.7 (83.7)	32.7 (90.9)	37.1 (98.8)	31.2 (88.2)	30.8 (87.4)	26.0 (78.8)	24.6 (76.3)	21.2 (70.2)	37.1 (98.8)
Mean maximum °C (°F)	13.0 (55.4)	13.8 (56.8)	18.1 (64.6)	21.5 (70.7)	24.6 (76.3)	27.9 (82.2)	29.7 (85.5)	28.5 (83.3)	25.5 (77.9)	21.0 (69.8)	16.6 (61.9)	13.8 (56.8)	29.7 (85.5)
Mean daily maximum °C (°F)	5.8 (42.4)	7.0 (44.6)	11.1 (52.0)	14.7 (58.5)	18.5 (65.3)	22.5 (72.5)	25.2 (77.4)	24.1 (75.4)	20.6 (69.1)	15.4 (59.7)	10.4 (50.7)	6.9 (44.4)	15.2 (59.3)
Daily mean °C (°F)	2.5 (36.5)	3.7 (38.7)	7.0 (44.6)	11.0 (51.8)	14.7 (58.5)	18.4 (65.1)	21.1 (70.0)	20.2 (68.4)	16.9 (62.4)	11.9 (53.4)	6.8 (44.2)	3.6 (38.5)	11.5 (52.7)
Mean daily minimum °C (°F)	−0.2 (31.6)	1.0 (33.8)	3.5 (38.3)	7.3 (45.1)	10.8 (51.4)	13.7 (56.7)	16.1 (61.0)	15.6 (60.1)	12.8 (55.0)	8.6 (47.5)	3.8 (38.8)	1.0 (33.8)	7.8 (46.1)
Mean minimum °C (°F)	−3.9 (25.0)	−2.6 (27.3)	−0.7 (30.7)	3.2 (37.8)	6.7 (44.1)	9.5 (49.1)	12.2 (54.0)	11.9 (53.4)	9.1 (48.4)	4.3 (39.7)	−0.4 (31.3)	−2.5 (27.5)	−3.9 (25.0)
Record low °C (°F)	−9.0 (15.8)	−7.6 (18.3)	−6.5 (20.3)	0.2 (32.4)	4.1 (39.4)	6.8 (44.2)	9.2 (48.6)	9.5 (49.1)	6.0 (42.8)	1.6 (34.9)	−3.0 (26.6)	−6.0 (21.2)	−9.0 (15.8)
Average precipitation mm (inches)	79.0 (3.11)	74.0 (2.91)	110.0 (4.33)	157.0 (6.18)	201.0 (7.91)	175.0 (6.89)	138.0 (5.43)	173.0 (6.81)	160.0 (6.30)	146.0 (5.75)	126.0 (4.96)	65.0 (2.56)	1,604 (63.14)
Average precipitation days (≥ 1.0 mm)	6.0	7.0	8.0	10.0	14.0	11.0	9.0	10.0	8.0	8.0	8.0	6.0	105
Average relative humidity (%)	71.0	69.0	65.0	65.0	70.0	69.0	67.0	70.0	74.0	76.0	73.0	70.0	69.9
Mean monthly sunshine hours	118.3	122.8	164.8	175.7	181.6	215.5	250.7	230.0	189.4	152.5	109.0	117.3	2,027.6
Source: NOAA

== Demographics ==
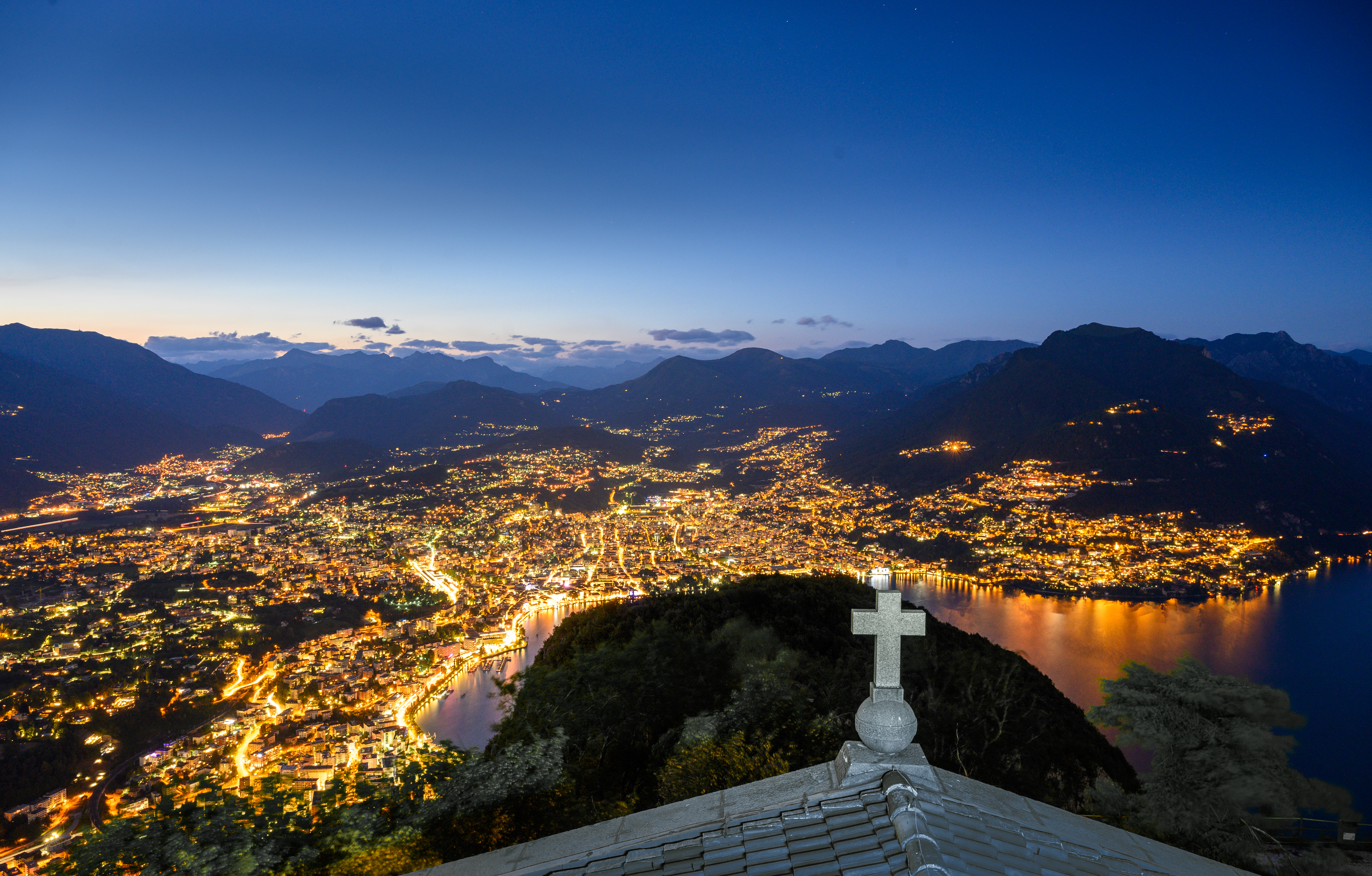
Night view of Lugano from Monte San Salvatore

Historical population
Year	Pop.	±%
1850	12,400	—
1860	12,386	−0.1%
1870	13,578	+9.6%
1880	13,549	−0.2%
1888	15,076	+11.3%
1900	18,034	+19.6%
1910	23,723	+31.5%
1920	23,622	−0.4%
1930	26,290	+11.3%
1941	28,698	+9.2%
1950	30,964	+7.9%
1960	35,281	+13.9%
1970	44,342	+25.7%
1980	48,784	+10.0%
1990	50,423	+3.4%
2000	55,751	+10.6%
2010	60,238	+8.0%
2020	62,315	+3.4%
Source: FSO

Lugano has a population of 63,691 as of 31 December 2025, of which 48.4% are males, and 51.6% are females. Minors make up 14.4% of the population, and seniors make up 23.1%.

The population is Italian-speaking and mainly Catholic by faith. Lugano is the largest city outside Italy with Italian as official language.

The age distribution, as of 2025, in Lugano is; 7.2% (4,573) of the population are children 0-9 years old, and 9.4% (6,011) are between 10-19. Of the adult population, 12.2% (7,744) are 20-29, 12.6% (8,049) are 30-39, 12.8% (8,152) are 40-49, and 15.4% (9,820) are 50-59, 12.9% (8,186) are 60-69, 9.2% (5,883) are 70-79, 6.6% (4,187) are 80-89, 1.6% (1,047) are 90-99, and 0.1% (39) are 100 years or older, known as centenarians.

As of 2000 the average number of residents per living room was 0.61 which is about equal to the cantonal average of 0.6 per room. In this case, a room is defined as space of a housing unit of at least 4 m^{2} (43 sq ft) as normal bedrooms, dining rooms, living rooms, kitchens and habitable cellars and attics. About 19.1% of the total households were owner occupied, or in other words, did not pay rent (though they may have a mortgage or a rent-to-own agreement).

As of 2000, there were 23,168 private households in the municipality and an average of 2 persons per household. In 2000 there were 489 single-family homes (or 20.6% of the total) out of a total of 2,372 inhabited buildings. There were 214 two-family buildings (9.0%) and 1,046 multi-family buildings (44.1%). There were also 623 buildings in the municipality that were multipurpose buildings (used for both housing and commercial or another purpose).

The vacancy rate for the municipality, in 2008, was 0.64%. In 2000 there were 16,333 apartments in the municipality. The most common apartment size was the 3 room apartment of which there were 5,398. There were 1,811 single-room apartments and 2,019 apartments with five or more rooms. Of these apartments, a total of 13,342 apartments (81.7% of the total) were permanently occupied, while 2,485 apartments (15.2%) were seasonally occupied and 506 apartments (3.1%) were empty. As of 2007, the construction rate of new housing units was 3.3 new units per 1000 residents.

As of 2003 the average price to rent an average apartment in Lugano was 1073.49 Swiss francs (CHF) per month (US$860, £480, €690 approx. exchange rate from 2003). The average rate for a one-room apartment was 623.12 CHF (US$500, £280, €400), a two-room apartment was about 809.81 CHF (US$650, £360, €520), a three-room apartment was about 1030.53 CHF (US$820, £460, €660) and a six or more room apartment cost an average of 1890.13 CHF (US$1510, £850, €1210). The average apartment price in Lugano was 96.2% of the national average of 1116 CHF.

=== Immigration ===
As of 31 December 2025, immigrants make up 50.8% of the population, and foreign citizens make up 40.9% of the total population. The 5 largest foreign countries of citizenship are Italy, Portugal, Ukraine, Serbia, and Germany.

Foreign population by citizenship (2025)
Citizenship	Population
Italy	16,101
Portugal	996
Ukraine	681
Serbia	604
Germany	571
Kosovo	460
Spain	421
Romania	394
France	391
Turkey	369
Bosnia and Herzegovina	299
Russia	260
Brazil	244
Eritrea	239
Croatia	235

=== Languages ===
Most of the population (as of 2000) speaks Italian (80.3%), with German being second most common (7.1%) and Serbo-Croatian being third (2.7%). Of the Swiss national languages (as of 2000), 20,998 people speak Italian, 1,855 speak German, 597 people speak French, and 39 people speak Romansh. The remainder (3,071 people) speak another language.

=== Religion ===
From the 2000 census, 18,035 or 67.9% were Catholic, while 1,517 or 5.7% belonged to the Swiss Reformed Church. There are 4,714 individuals (or about 17.75% of the population) who belong to another church (not listed on the census), and 2,294 individuals (or about 8.64% of the population) did not answer the question.

== Politics ==
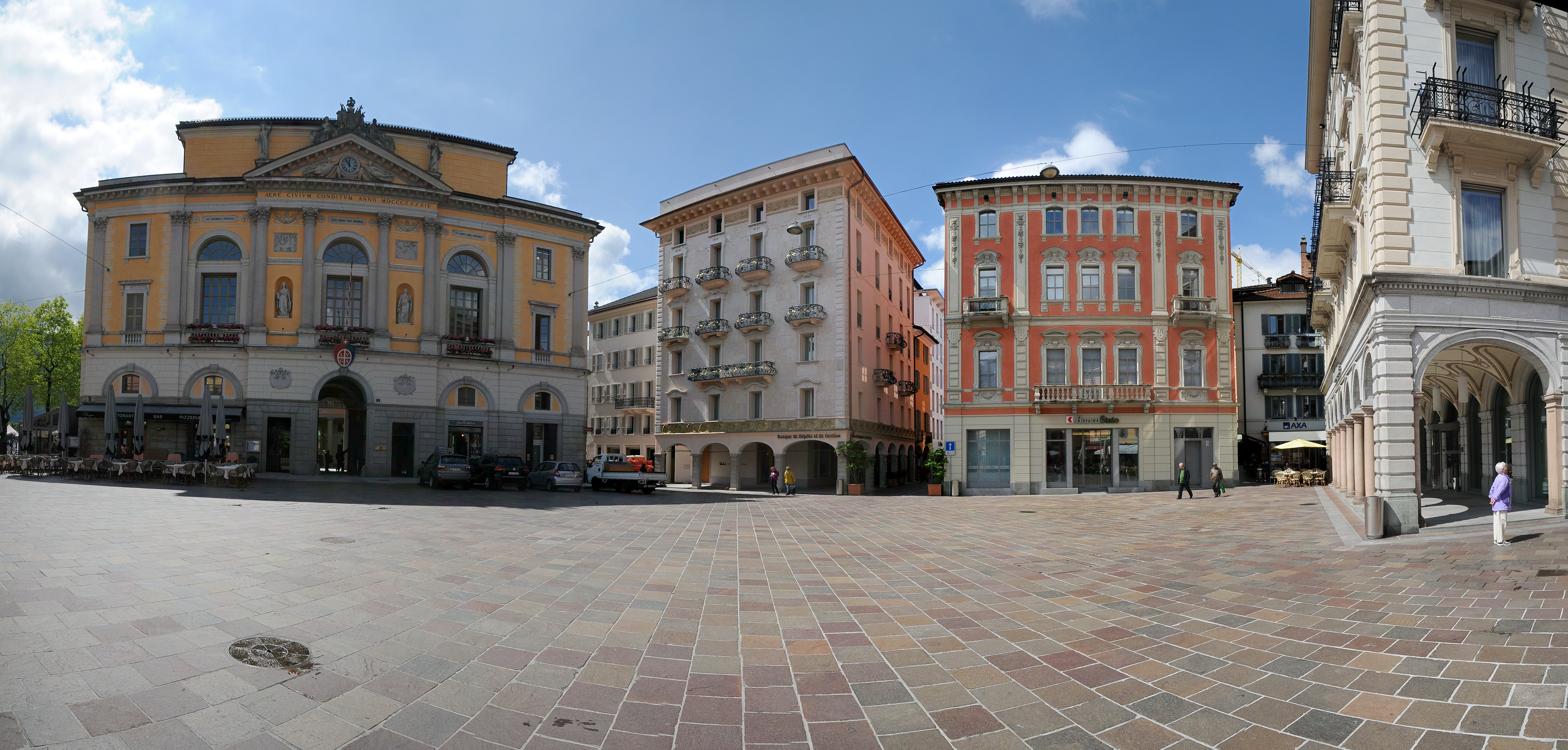
The Piazza della Riforma is one of the main squares of Lugano. It includes the Town Hall of Lugano (left), named Palazzo Civico

=== Coat of arms ===
The blazon of the municipal coat of arms is Gules, a cross throughout argent, between the upper case serif letters L, V, G and A (respectively in the I, II, III and IV quarters). The coat of arms dates from around 1200. The four letters on the coat of arms are an abbreviation of the name Lugano.

=== Neighborhoods and circles ===
The municipality is subdivided into 25 quartieri (neighborhoods) which are grouped into three (cantonal) circles.

Quarters 1–9 are the older quarters of the city, which have been added to by successive enlargements of the municipality in 2004, 2008 and 2013; these enlargements involved previously independent municipalities becoming parts of the municipality.

Quarters
Quartier	No.	BFS-Code	Date joined Lugano	Former municipality	Circle	Quartieri of Lugano
Aldesago	1	5192001	1972	Brè-Aldesago	East	Quartieri of Lugano
Besso	2	5192002	–	–	West	Quartieri of Lugano
Brè	3	5192003	1972	Brè-Aldesago	East	Quartieri of Lugano
Caprino	4	5192004	1972	Castagnola-Cassarate	East	Quartieri of Lugano
Cassarate	5	5192005	1972	Castagnola-Cassarate	East	Quartieri of Lugano
Castagnola	6	5192006	1972	Castagnola-Cassarate	East	Quartieri of Lugano
Centro	7	5192007	–	–	West	Quartieri of Lugano
Loreto	8	5192008	–	–	West	Quartieri of Lugano
Molino Nuovo	9	5192009	–	–	West	Quartieri of Lugano
Breganzona	11	5192011	2004	Breganzona	West	Quartieri of Lugano
Cureggia	12	5192012	2004	Cureggia	East	Quartieri of Lugano
Davesco-Soragno	13	5192013	2004	Davesco-Soragno	North	Quartieri of Lugano
Gandria	14	5192014	2004	Gandria	East	Quartieri of Lugano
Pambio-Noranco	15	5192015	2004	Pambio-Noranco	East	Quartieri of Lugano
Pazzallo	16	5192016	2004	Pazzallo	West	Quartieri of Lugano
Pregassona	17	5192017	2004	Pregassona	East	Quartieri of Lugano
Viganello	18	5192018	2004	Viganello	East	Quartieri of Lugano
Barbengo	19	5192021	2008	Barbengo	West	Quartieri of Lugano
Carabbia	20	5192022	2008	Carabbia	West	Quartieri of Lugano
Villa Luganese	21	5192023	2008	Villa Luganese	North	Quartieri of Lugano
Cadro	22	5192024	2013	Cadro	North	Quartieri of Lugano
Carona	23	5192025	2013	Carona	West	Quartieri of Lugano
Sonvico	24	5192026	2013	Sonvico	North	Quartieri of Lugano
Val Colla	25	5192027	2013	Cimadera, Certara, Bogno, Valcolla	North	Quartieri of Lugano

=== Elections ===
==== Cantonal ====
In the 2007 Grand Council of Ticino election, there were a total of 27,557 registered voters in Lugano, of which 15,214 or 55.2% voted. 237 blank ballots and 38 null ballots were cast, leaving 14,939 valid ballots in the election. The most popular party was the PLR which received 3,680 or 24.6% of the vote. The next three most popular parties were; the Lega (with 2,854 or 19.1%), the SSI (with 2,532 or 16.9%) and the PS (with 2,170 or 14.5%).

In the 2007 Council of State of Ticino election, 158 blank ballots and 79 null ballots were cast, leaving 14,980 valid ballots in the election. The most popular party was the Lega which received 3,839 or 25.6% of the vote. The next three most popular parties were; the PLR (with 3,596 or 24.0%), the PS (with 2,496 or 16.7%) and the SSI (with 2,169 or 14.5%).

==== National ====
In the 2019 federal election for the Swiss National Council the most popular party was the Lega which received 20.6% (-5.8) of the vote. The next five most popular parties were the PLR (20.3%, -2), the PPD (14.0%, -1.1), PS (13.9%, -1.3), the UDC (13.2%, -0.2), and the Green Party (11.1%, +7.0). In the federal election a total of 15,639 votes were cast, and the voter turnout was 46.6%.

In the 2007 federal election the most popular party was the PLR which received 26.6% of the vote. The next three most popular parties were the Lega (19%), the PPD (18.71%) and the PS (17.46%). In the federal election, a total of 11,980 votes were cast, and the voter turnout was 42.8%.

== Economy ==
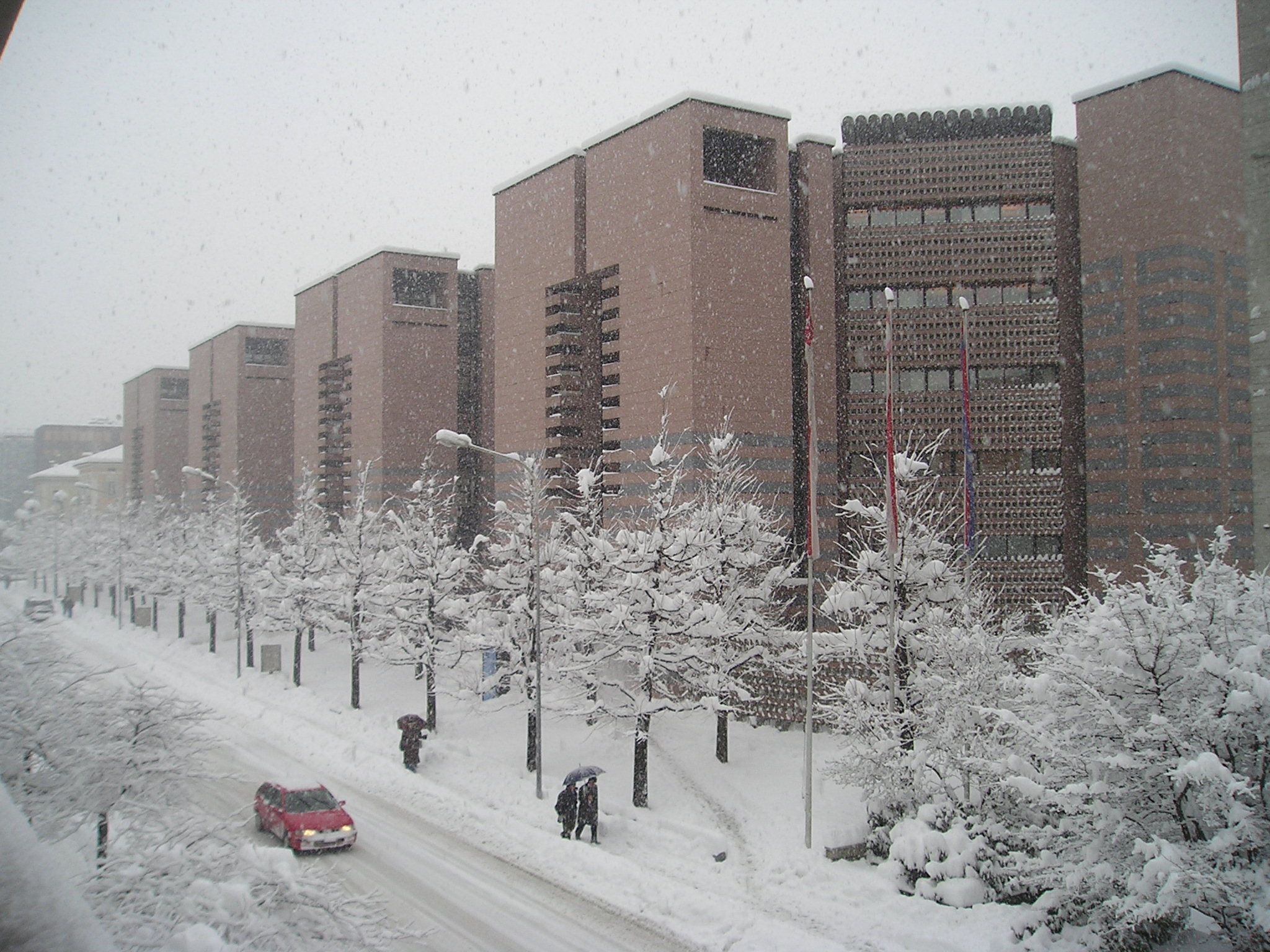
BSI buildings in Lugano

The city's economy provides an estimated 38,000 jobs, over a third of which are occupied by cross-border commuters. Business, tourism and finance constitute the backbone of the local economy. In 2000, the tertiary sector offered 90% of all jobs in Lugano, of which 75% were occupied by commuters, many of which commute from neighbouring Italy (approximately 13% of the active working population); in the same year tax revenues reached CHF 104 million, of which CHF 59 million were attributable to the banking sector. The town is Switzerland's third largest banking centre after Zürich and Geneva. With regards to intercommunal financial equalisation, thanks to its financial strength Lugano contributes significantly to the equalisation fund.

As of 2007, Lugano had an unemployment rate of 5.59%. As of 2005, there were 77 people employed in the primary economic sector and about 28 businesses involved in this sector. 3,520 people were employed in the secondary sector and there were 420 businesses in this sector. 33,601 people were employed in the tertiary sector, with 3,877 businesses in this sector. There were 12,191 residents of the municipality who were employed in some capacity, of which females made up 45.9% of the workforce.

In 2000, there were 28,174 workers who commuted into the municipality and 3,994 workers who commuted away. Lugano is the economic centre of the region and draws about 7.1 workers into the municipality for every one leaving. About 12.4% of the workforce coming into Lugano are coming from outside Switzerland, while 1.6% of the locals commute out of Switzerland for work. Of the working population, 15.2% used public transportation to get to work, and 44.6% used a private car.

As of 2009, there were 43 hotels in Lugano with a total of 1,584 rooms and 2,889 beds.

The airline Darwin Airline, operating under the brand name Etihad Regional since January 2014, has its head office on the grounds of Lugano Airport in Agno, near Lugano.

== Tourism ==
Lugano is one of the most popular tourist destinations in Switzerland. The city is home to a number of historic buildings and museums, whilst the surrounding area has many natural sights.

Both Lake Lugano and the surrounding mountains provide a wide variety of outdoor activities. The area surrounding Lugano is home to over 300 kilometres (190 mi) of mountain biking trails, the largest net of trails in Switzerland.

=== Heritage sites of national significance ===
17 sites in Lugano are part of the Swiss heritage site of national significance. The city of Lugano, the districts of Barbengo, Brè, Gandria and Biogno, and the sites of Cantine di Gandria and Castagnola are all part of the Inventory of Swiss Heritage Sites.

The heritage sites of national significance include two libraries, the Biblioteca Cantonale and the Biblioteca Salita dei Frati as well as the Swiss National Recording Archives (Fonoteca nazionale svizzera). There were three churches; Cathedral of San Lorenzo, Church of Santa Maria degli Angioli and the Church of San Rocco.

There were four museums; the Museo Cantonale d'Arte, Museum of Modern Art, Lugano, the Museo cantonale di storia naturale di Lugano and the Villa Ciani complex with the Museo civico. In 2015, the two art museums in the city merged to form MASI Lugano. The cemetery complex at via Trevano is also one of the sites, as is the Radiotelevisione svizzera di lingua italiana (RTSI) Italian-language broadcast facility. The rest of the sites are houses throughout the town. They include the Palazzo civico at piazza della Riforma, the Palazzo e cinema Corso at via Pioda, the Palazzo Riva at via Francesco Soave, the Palazzo Riva at via Massimiliano Magatti, the Palazzo Riva at via Pretorio 7 and Villa Favorita in Castagnola.

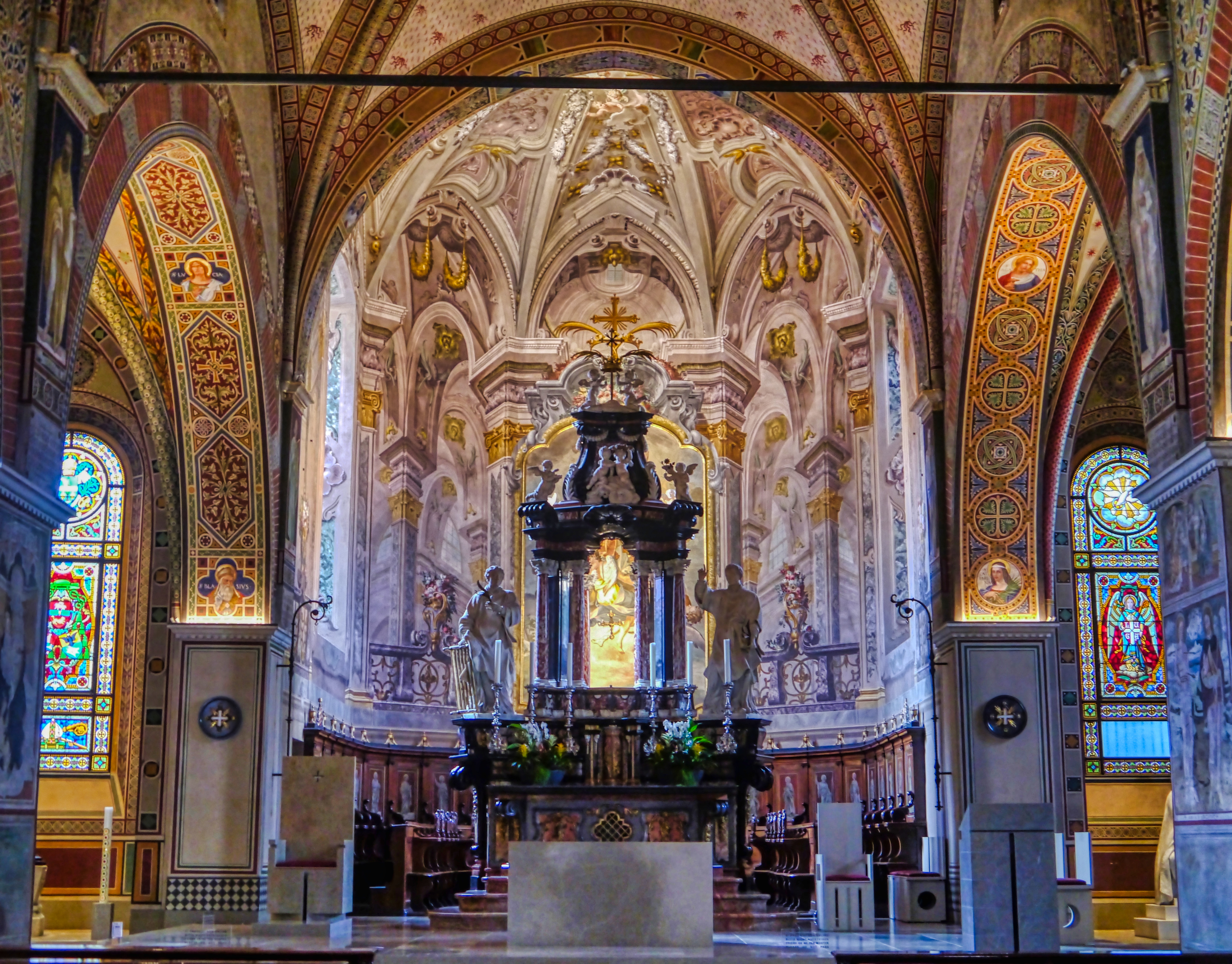
Cathedral of San Lorenzo

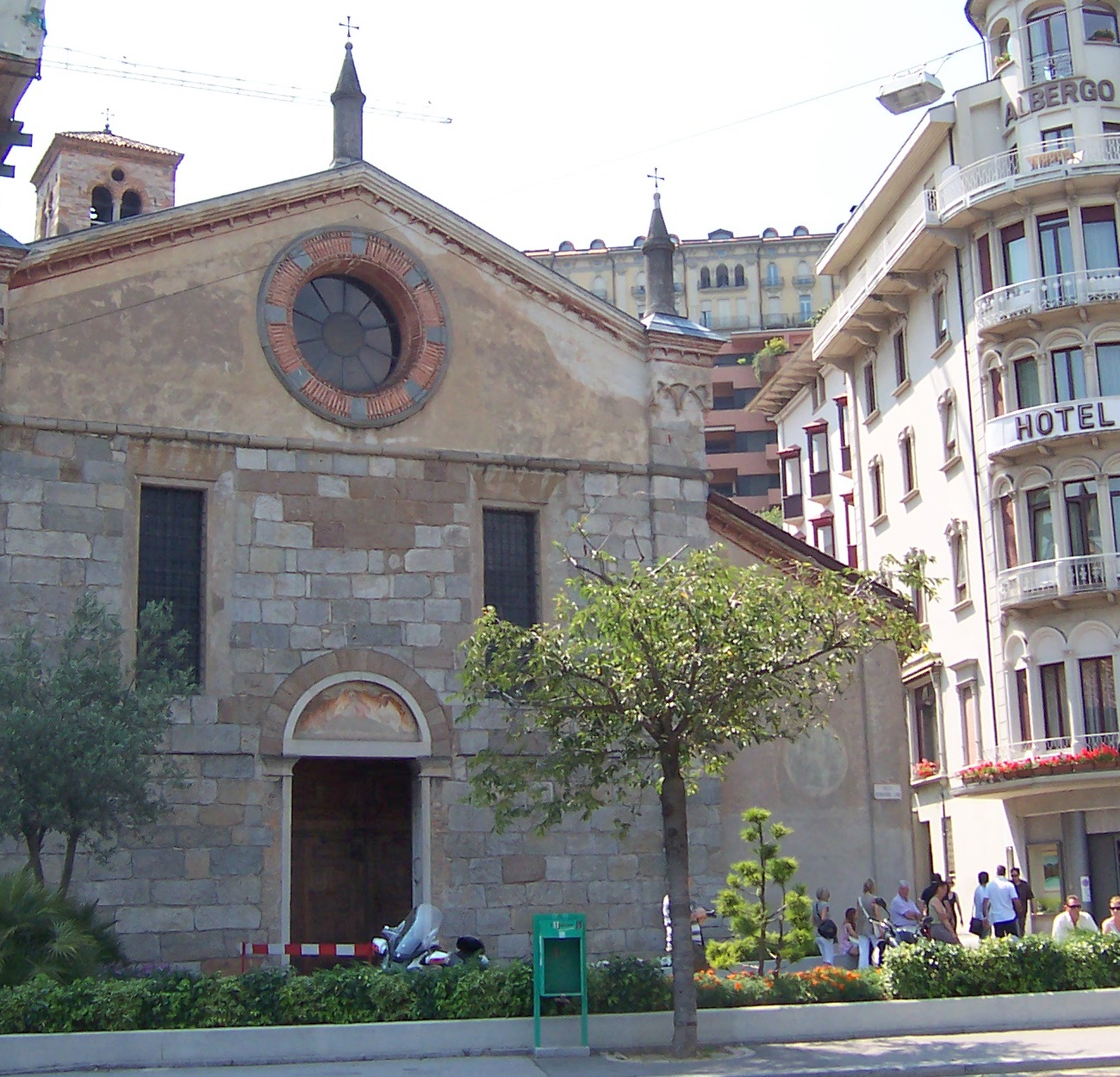
Church of Santa Maria degli Angioli

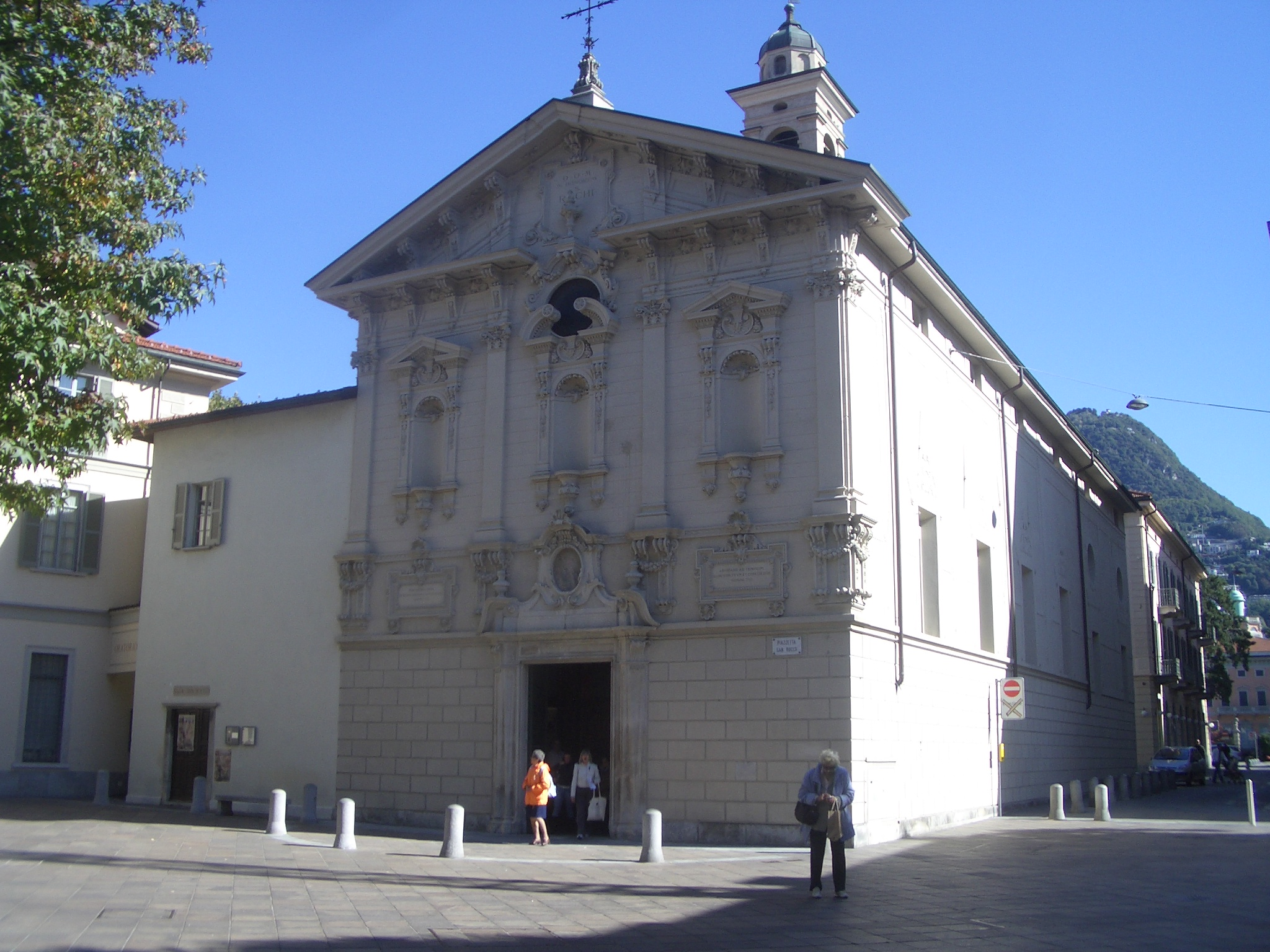
Church of San Rocco

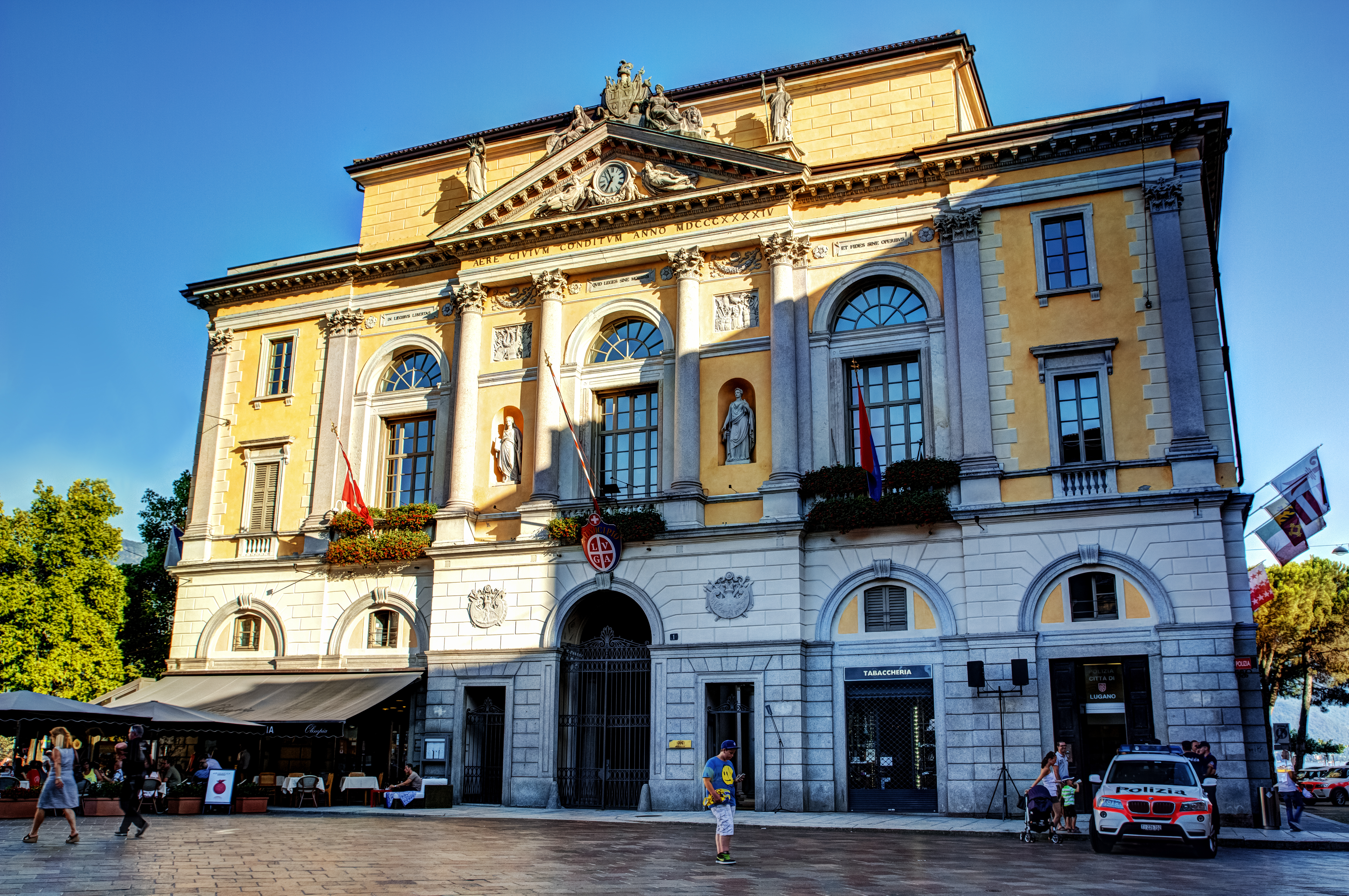
Palazzo Civico or City Hall

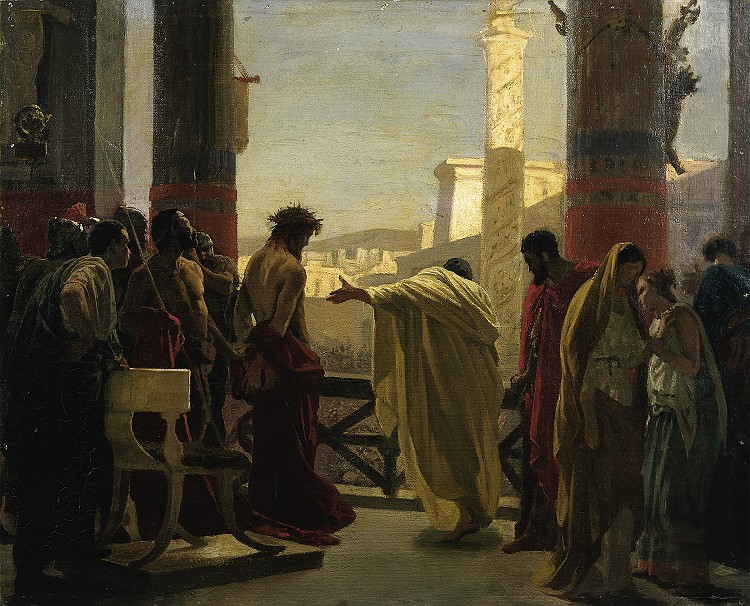
Sketch of Ecce Homo from MASI Lugano

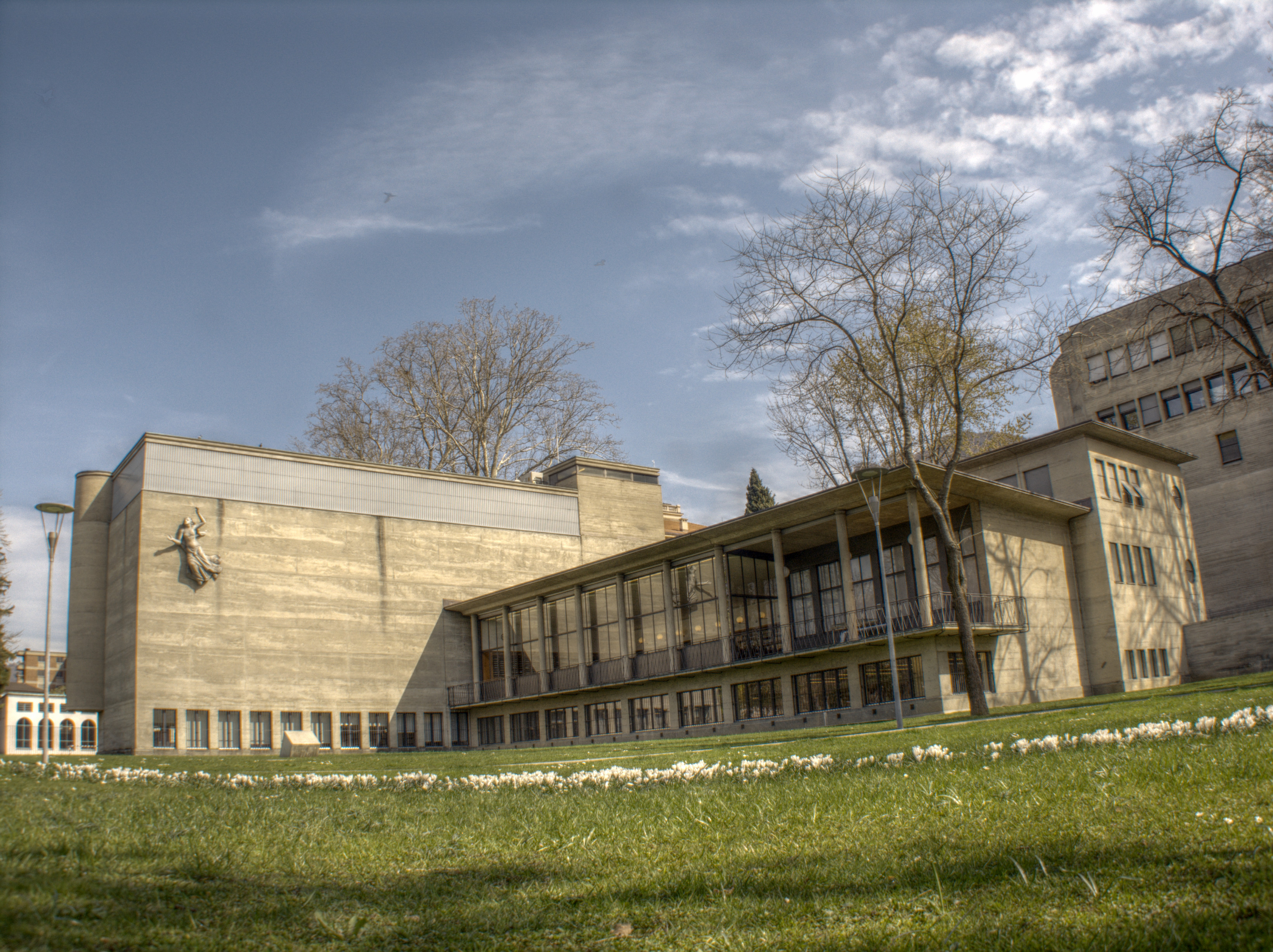
Biblioteca Cantonale

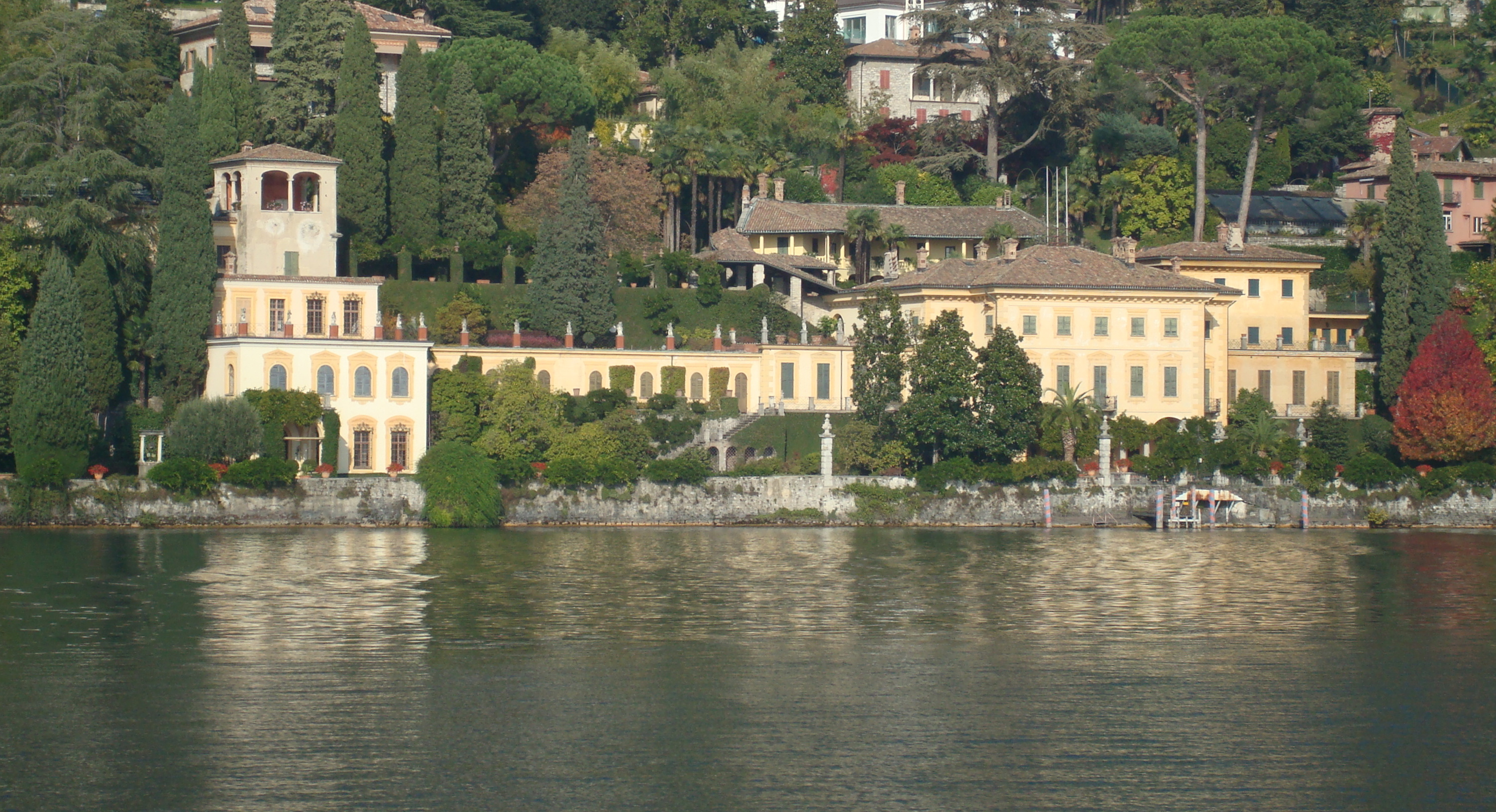
Villa Favorita in Castagnola

=== Natural sights ===
A very popular destination in Lugano is Lake Lugano. The lake is 48.7 square kilometres (18.8 sq mi) in size, 63% of which is in Switzerland and 37% in Italy. It has an average width of roughly 1 kilometre (0.62 mi) and is nearly 3 kilometres (1.9 mi) at its widest. The maximum depth of the lake is 279 meters (915 ft). The water is generally warm with average water temperatures in the summer ranging from 19.5 °C (67.1 °F) to 24.0 °C (75.2 °F).

Several companies provide tourist boat services on the lake. A popular excursion is by boat to the picturesque lakeside village of Gandria. Additionally, there are numerous shipyards, water taxis and boat rental sites along the lake, as well as hotels and restaurants that offer moorings. Bathing in the lake is allowed at any of the 50 or so bathing establishments located along the Swiss shores.

In addition to the lake, Lugano is surrounded by mountains, which provide a number of opportunities for sports or sightseeing. Two mountains, both providing excellent views over the city and lake, bracket each end of the town's waterfront. Monte Brè (933 metres (3,061 ft)), to the north, is reputedly Switzerland's sunniest spot and is also home to the old village of Brè. Monte San Salvatore (912 metres (2,992 ft)), to the south, has an old church and museum atop its summit. Both mountains are accessible by funicular railways, which are themselves easily accessible by frequent city bus or by car.

Slightly further afield is Monte Generoso (1,704 metres (5,591 ft)), with a view that encompasses the lakes of Lugano, Como and Maggiore, as well as the Alps from the Matterhorn to the Bernina Range, the Lombardy Plains, and, on a clear day, the city of Milan. The summit can be reached by taking either an SNL boat, or a railway train, to Capolago, and changing there onto a rack railway train of the Monte Generoso Railway.

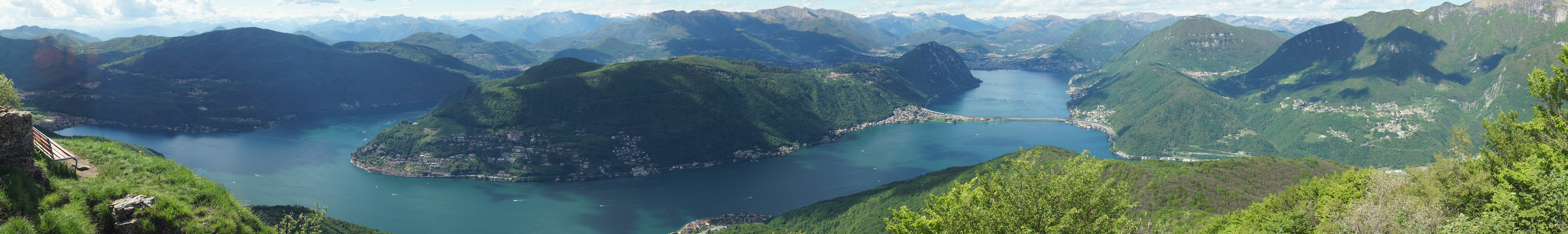
View of Lake Lugano from Monte San Giorgio

=== Religious buildings ===
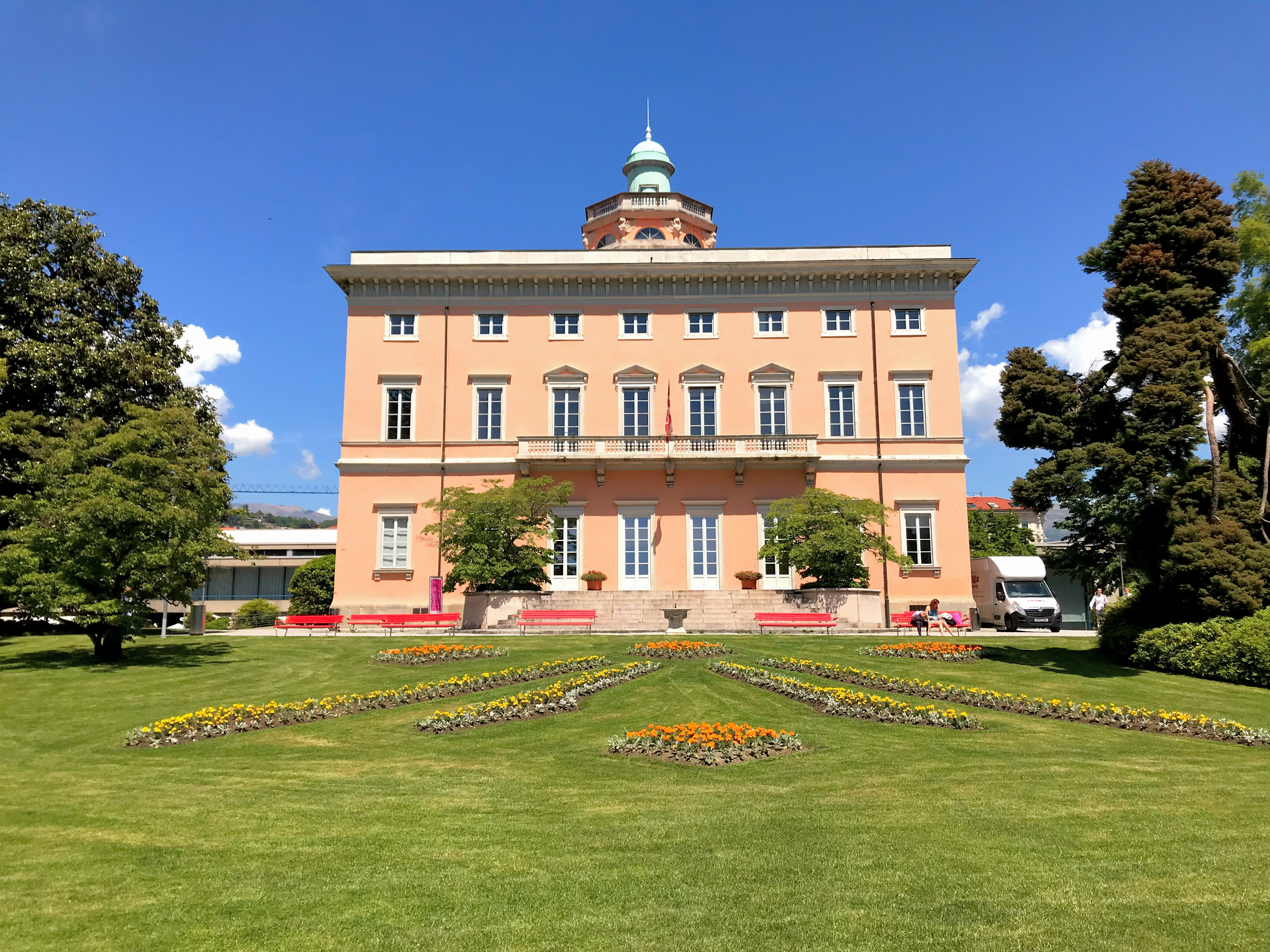
Villa Ciani

- St. Lawrence Cathedral (9th and 15th century)
- St. Mary of the Angels Church (16th century) with the fresco of the Christ's Passion from Bernardino Luini
- San Rocco Church
- Sant'Antonio Abate

=== Secular buildings ===
- Park and Villa Ciani
- Palazzo Civico
- Villa Favorita
- Palazzo Albertolli

=== Museums ===
- MASI Lugano (or Swiss–Italian Art Museum), on three sites:
  - Lugano Arte e Cultura (LAC), a cultural centre dedicated to visual arts, music and performing arts
  - Palazzo Reali
  - Giancarlo and Danna Olgiati Collection
- Museo delle Culture (Museum of Cultures)
- Foundation Aligi Sassu and Helenita Olivares
- Historical Museum
- Cantonal Museum of Natural History of Lugano
- Swiss Customs Museum
- Wilhelm Schmid Museum
- Hermann Hesse Museum
- Swiss National Sound Archives

== Education and research ==
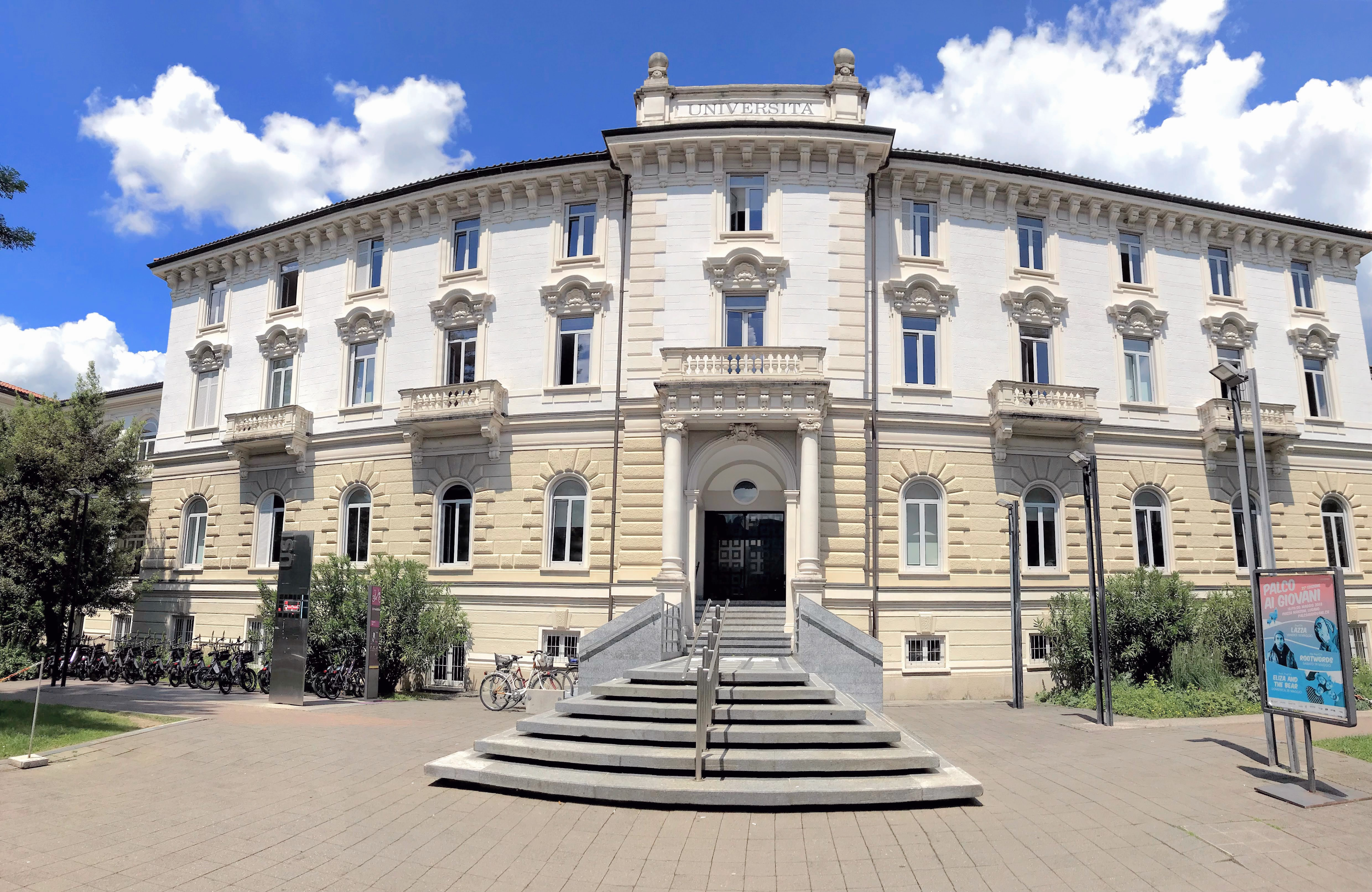
University of Lugano

In Lugano about 63.7% of the population (between age 25–64) have completed either non-mandatory upper secondary education or additional higher education (either university or a University of Applied Sciences).

In Lugano there were a total of 7,931 students (as of 2009). The Ticino education system provides up to three years of non-mandatory kindergarten and in Lugano there were 1,356 children in kindergarten. The primary school program lasts for five years and includes both a standard school and a special school. In the municipality, 2,280 students attended the standard primary schools and 129 students attended the special school. In the lower secondary school system, students either attend a two-year middle school followed by a two-year pre-apprenticeship or they attend a four-year program to prepare for higher education. There were 1,932 students in the two-year middle school and 47 in their pre-apprenticeship, while 884 students were in the four-year advanced program.

The upper secondary school includes several options, but at the end of the upper secondary program, a student will be prepared to enter a trade or to continue on to a university or college. In Ticino, vocational students may either attend school while working on their internship or apprenticeship (which takes three or four years) or may attend school followed by an internship or apprenticeship (which takes one year as a full-time student or one and a half to two years as a part-time student). There were 492 vocational students who were attending school full-time and 722 who attend part-time.

The professional program lasts three years and prepares a student for a job in engineering, nursing, computer science, business, tourism and similar fields. There were 89 students in the professional program. As of 2000, there were 3,537 students in Lugano who came from another municipality, while 887 residents attended schools outside the municipality.

Lugano is home to 2 libraries. These libraries include; the Biblioteca universitaria di Lugano and the Biblioteca cantonale Lugano. There was a combined total (as of 2008) of 448,811 books or other media in the libraries, and in the same year a total of 51,740 items were loaned out.

The headquarter of the university Università della Svizzera italiana in Lugano includes 5 of its 6 faculties, the Academy of Architecture being based in Mendrisio. The main building, built in 1909, was originally the hospital of Lugano and since 1996 it is home of the university. In the next years, several added buildings enriched the headquarter until the other side of the river, in the quarter called Viganello. In fact, the area of the older buildings on the west side of the river is called "West Campus" (or "Campus Ovest" in Italian), whereas the newest building (active since 2021) on the other side of the river is called "East Campus" (or "Campus Est" in Italian) and it houses both the university USI and the University of Applied Sciences of Southern Switzerland SUPSI.

Some of the universities and colleges in Lugano include:

- Università della Svizzera Italiana (USI): This Swiss university, translated as "University of Italian Switzerland", which is organised in 6 faculties: the Faculty of Informatics, Faculty of Economics, Faculty of Communication, Culture and Society, Faculty of Biomedical Sciences, Faculty of Theology and the Academy of Architecture (which is based in Mendrisio).
- Swiss National Supercomputing Centre: an autonomous unit of ETH Zürich that focuses on high-performance computing.
- Dalle Molle Institute for Artificial Intelligence (IDSIA): a non-profit oriented research institute for artificial intelligence, affiliated with both the Università della Svizzera Italiana and SUPSI.
- Franklin University Switzerland: an American and Swiss accredited liberal arts college.
- The American School In Switzerland: an international secondary school.
- SUPSI: University of Applied Sciences and Arts of Southern Switzerland.

== Transport ==
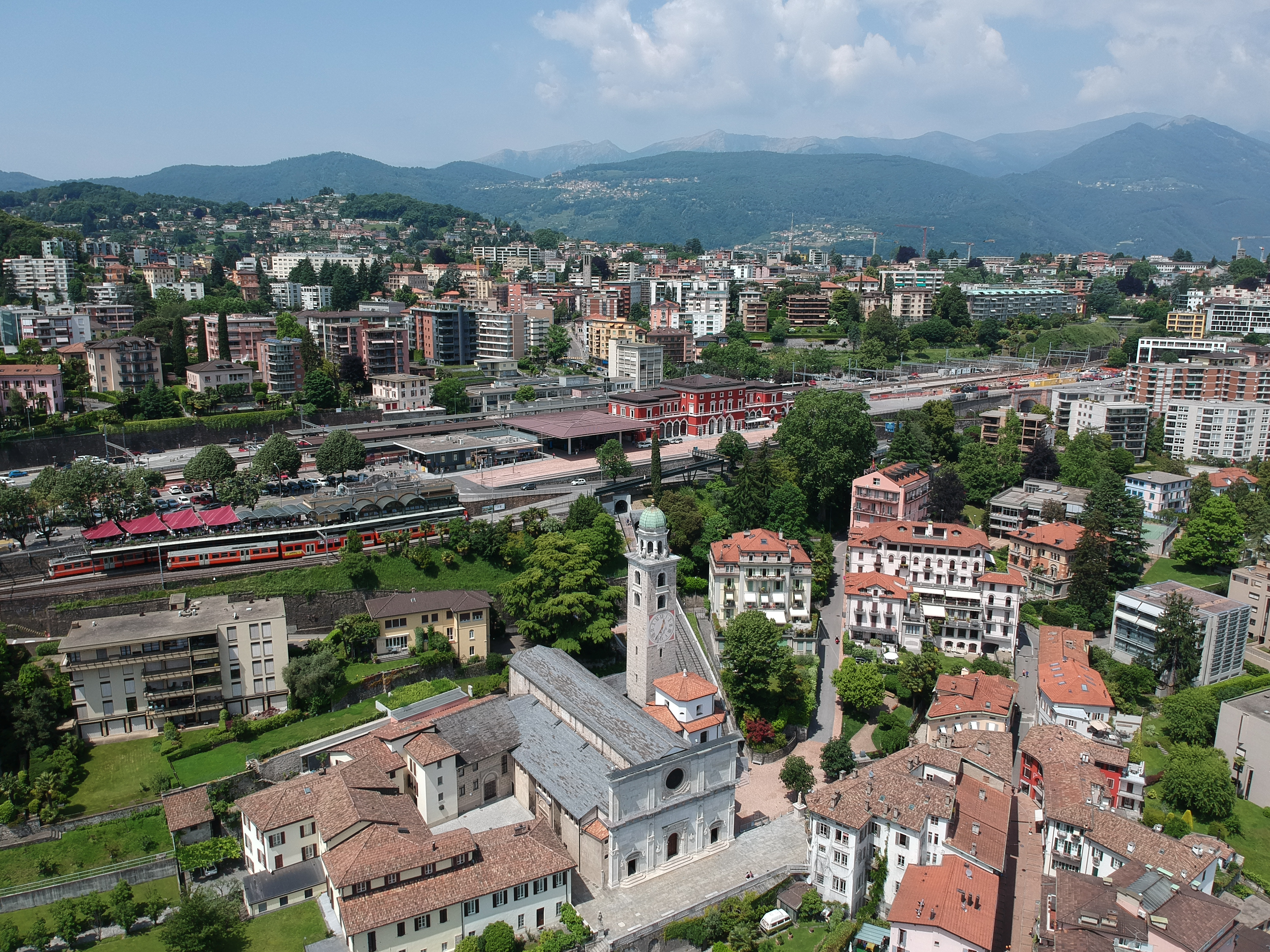
Lugano railway station (above the cathedral) with both SBB and FLP railways. The tracks of the funicular are also visible (to the right of the cathedral)

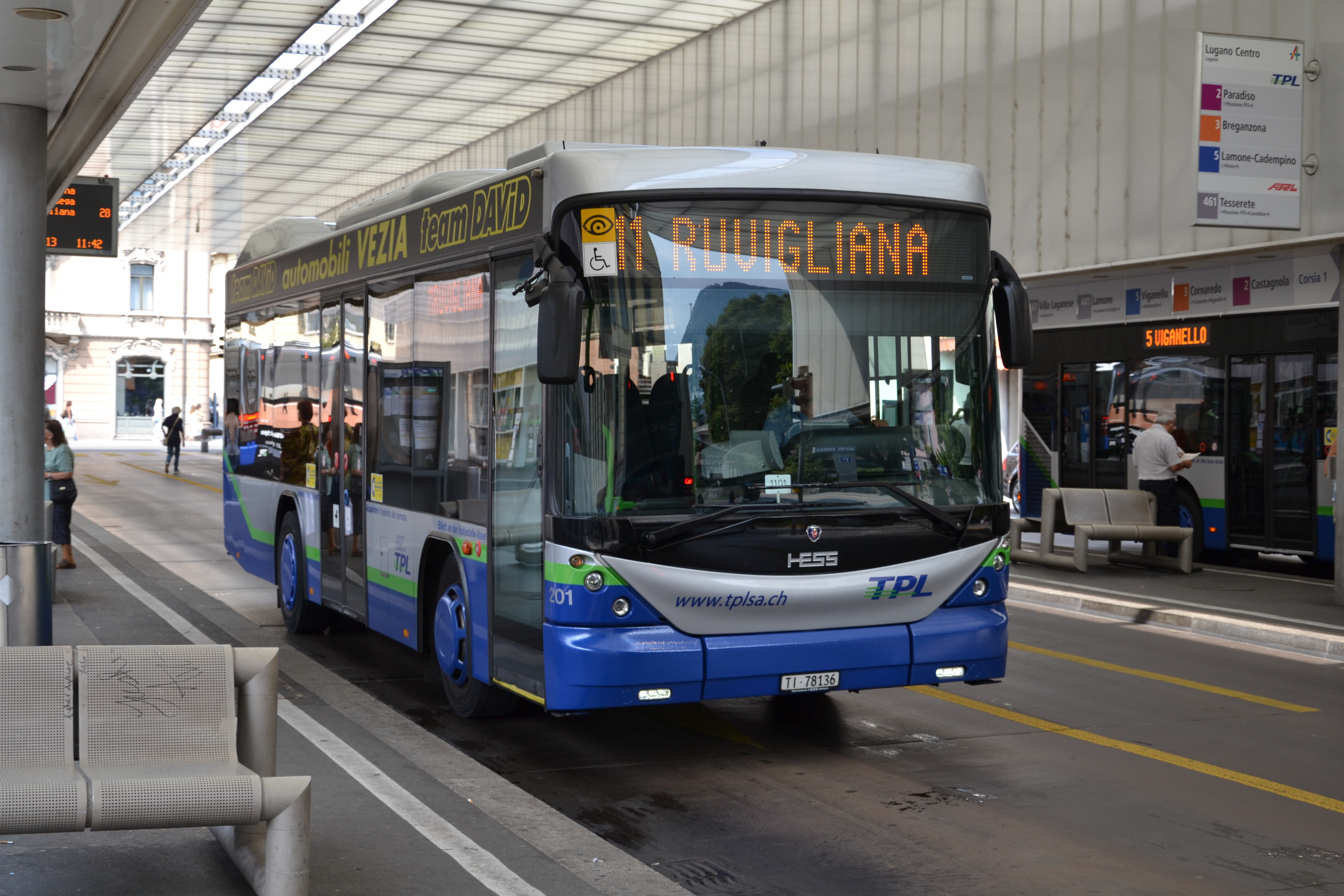
The central bus station

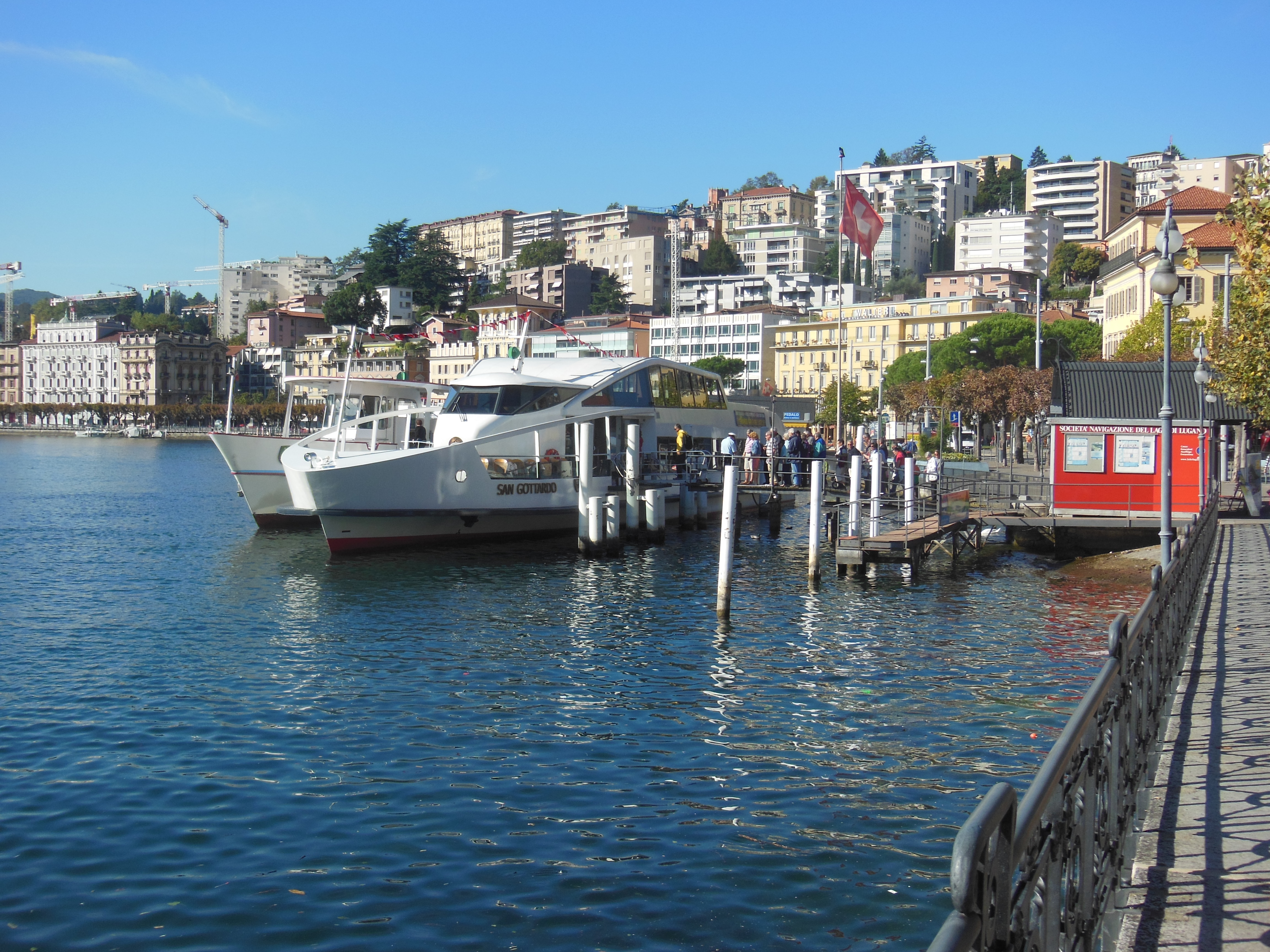
Lugano landing stage

=== Air ===
Lugano is served by Lugano Airport, in the nearby municipality of Agno. Currently, only Silver Air operates to Lugano Airport. While there is limited service to Lugano's airport, Milan's airports are not that far away and provide access to a greater number of worldwide locations. Milan Malpensa Airport is connected to Lugano by a direct hourly train with a travel time of 1:45h from/to Lugano, or about one hour, 80 km by road.

=== Railways ===
Lugano's railway station is situated on the historically and concurrently important Gotthard railway line, which links northern Switzerland with Ticino and Italy. Since the inauguration of the Gotthard Base Tunnel, in 2016, and the Ceneri Base Tunnel, in 2020, train connections with cities in Northern Switzerland, such as Zürich, Lucerne and Basel, have been improved, with significantly faster services through the base tunnels.

Long-distance trains of the Swiss Federal Railways (SBB CFF FFS), together with international trains of Trenitalia, connect Lugano with the cities of northern Switzerland and with Italy. The trains operate under the InterCity and EuroCity brands. Service is provided hourly to Zürich and once every two hours to Basel and Milan. One train per day operates to each of Bologna, Genoa and Venice. All the above trains operate via the Gotthard and Ceneri base tunnels. Between April and mid October, the tourist oriented Gotthard Panorama Express connects Lugano with Lucerne once a day by train and boat, travelling by train over the historic high-level Gotthard route, and then by boat along the length of Lake Lucerne.

Lugano is also served by several lines of regional trains of the Treni Regionali Ticino Lombardia (TILO) network which operates in the canton of Ticino and the north of the Italian region of Lombardy. Line RE80 provides a half-hourly semi-fast service northbound to Locarno and southbound to Mendrisio and Chiasso, with alternate southbound trains continuing to Milan. Line S10 provides a half-hourly all-stations service northbound to Bellinzona and Biasca and southbound to Mendrisio and Chiasso, with alternate southbound trains continuing to Como and occasional northbound trains continuing to Airolo. Line S50 provides an hourly service to Milan Malpensa Airport, running coupled to an S10 service between Biasca and Mendrisio. All the above trains use the Ceneri Base Tunnel, but line S90 provides a half-hourly service north to Giubiasco and an hourly service south to Mendrisio serving all the stations over the old high-level Ceneri route.

Additionally, the metre gauge (3 ft 3 3/8 in gauge) Lugano-Ponte Tresa Railway (FLP) provides a quarter-hourly service to Agno, Lugano Airport and Ponte Tresa. The service operates as line S60 from its own station adjacent to the main railway station.

Lugano is also served by three funicular railways. The Funicolare Città–Stazione, which has recently been renewed, is a short line connecting Lugano railway station to the lower part of the city centre by the lake, whilst the Funicolare Monte Brè and the Funicolare Monte San Salvatore ascend nearby hills to vantage points. A fourth funicular, the Funicolare degli Angioli, still exists but has not operated since 1986.

=== Road ===
Lugano is located along the A2 motorway, a part of the European route E35 that stretches over 1,600 km (990 mi) between Amsterdam and Rome. Like the original railway, the A2 to the north crosses the Ceneri and Gotthard passes and links Lugano to northern Switzerland and, via Basel, to the German motorway network. To the south it crosses the Swiss-Italian border at Chiasso, linking to the Italian motorway network. The motorway runs to the west and south of the city, using extensive tunnelling to deal with the mountainous landscape.

The Trasporti Pubblici Luganesi (TPL) operate frequent inner city buses throughout Lugano and some of its closer neighbours. The Autolinee Regionali Luganesi (ARL) runs buses connecting Lugano with the districts of Davesco, Sonvico and the towns of Canobbio, Lamone and Tesserete, whilst the Società Navigazione del Lago di Lugano (SNL) runs buses to the lakeside districts of Gandria and Campione d'Italia, complementing its boat services to the same locations. TPL, ARL and SNL services operate from the Lugano Centro bus station.

Longer distance buses, as well as some local buses, are operated by PostBus Switzerland, known locally as the AutoPostale. Its Palm Express service connects Lugano railway station to St. Moritz. Other AutoPostale buses operate from an underground bus station and ticket office, located at Via Balestra 4 in the centre of Lugano. ASF Autolinee, an Italian bus company, operates an international bus route from Lugano to Menaggio, on the shores of Lake Como.

=== Shipping ===
Boats of the Società Navigazione del Lago di Lugano (SNL) provide services on Lake Lugano. Whilst these are principally provided for tourist purposes, they also connect Lugano with other lakeside communities. Several of the landing points are within the sparsely populated section of the municipality that lies on the east side of the lake and have no road access.

== Culture ==
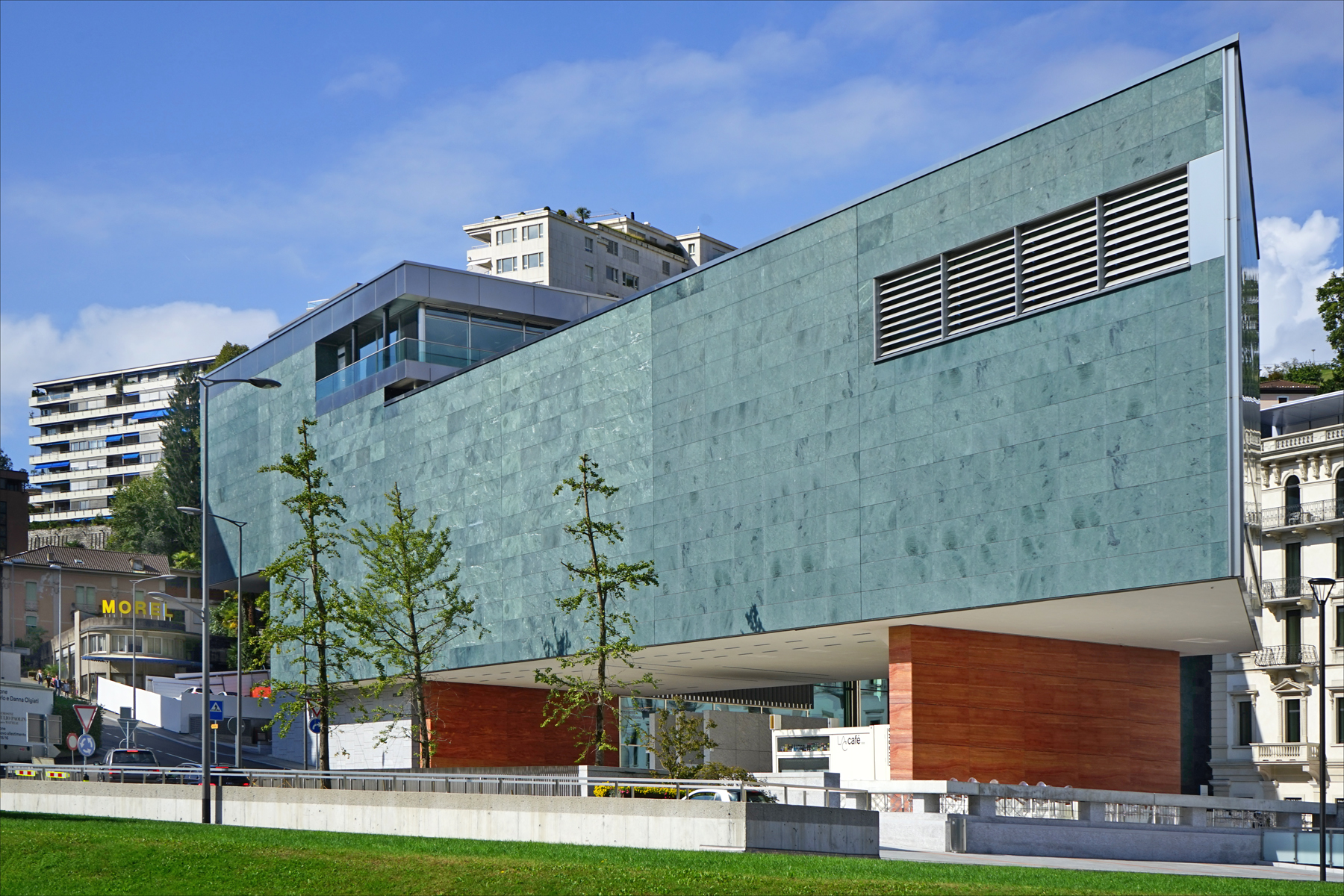
Lugano Arte e Cultura (LAC)

Lugano hosts the Swiss National Sound Archives, responsible for safeguarding the sound heritage of Switzerland.

The Palazzo dei Congressi is the performing arts centre for Lugano. It is the main venue for the Orchestra della Svizzera Italiana.

The Lugano Festival runs during April and May, followed by the related "Progetto Martha Argerich" in June. Estival Jazz arrives in July. Between July and August, there is the LongLake Festival, one of the greatest urban open-air happenings in Switzerland. During one month, the LongLake offers over 300 events in downtown Lugano.

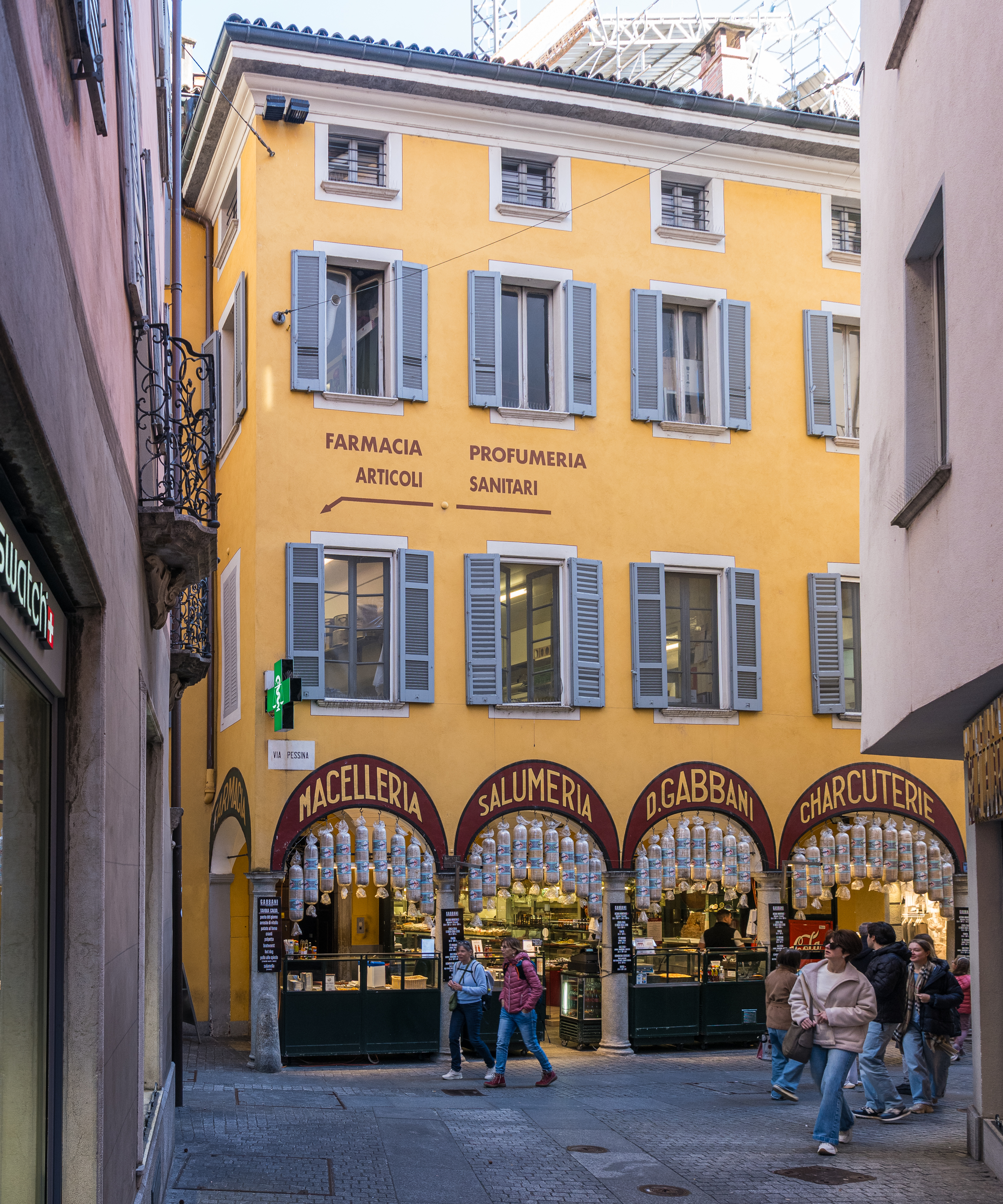
A traditional food shop in Lugano

The Blues-to-Bop Festival arrives in late August and early September turns the town into a hive of activity as thousands crowd the streets and piazzas for free open-air concerts.

In 1956, the Teatro Kursaal in Lugano hosted the first Eurovision Song Contest.

The MASI (Museo d'Arte della Svizzera italiana) has two parallel objectives: the conservation and study of the Museum's permanent collection, which is above all made up of works belonging to the 19th and 20th centuries; and the planning and presentation of temporary exhibitions. It focuses on the art of the cantons of Ticino and Graubünden (Grigioni in Italian) and presents artists from the region on a regular basis. Lugano Arte e Cultura (LAC) is a cultural centre dedicated to music, visual and performance arts. It opened in 2015.

The district of Brè-Aldesago offers its visitors areas created by its characteristic stone buildings. The cobblestone streets of the town offer art enthusiasts an artistic path that is considered to be very interesting both because of the presence of national and international "names" and the combination of art and the environment.

=== Media ===
Lugano is the main media center for Italian-speaking Switzerland. It is the headquarters for the numerous Italian language radio and television networks of the Swiss Broadcasting Corporation, known collectively as Radiotelevisione svizzera. TeleTicino is the local television channel which broadcast from its studios in the Melide area of Lugano. Due to the proximity to Italy, many Italian television channels are also available. The local newspaper is served by the laRegione.

== Sports ==
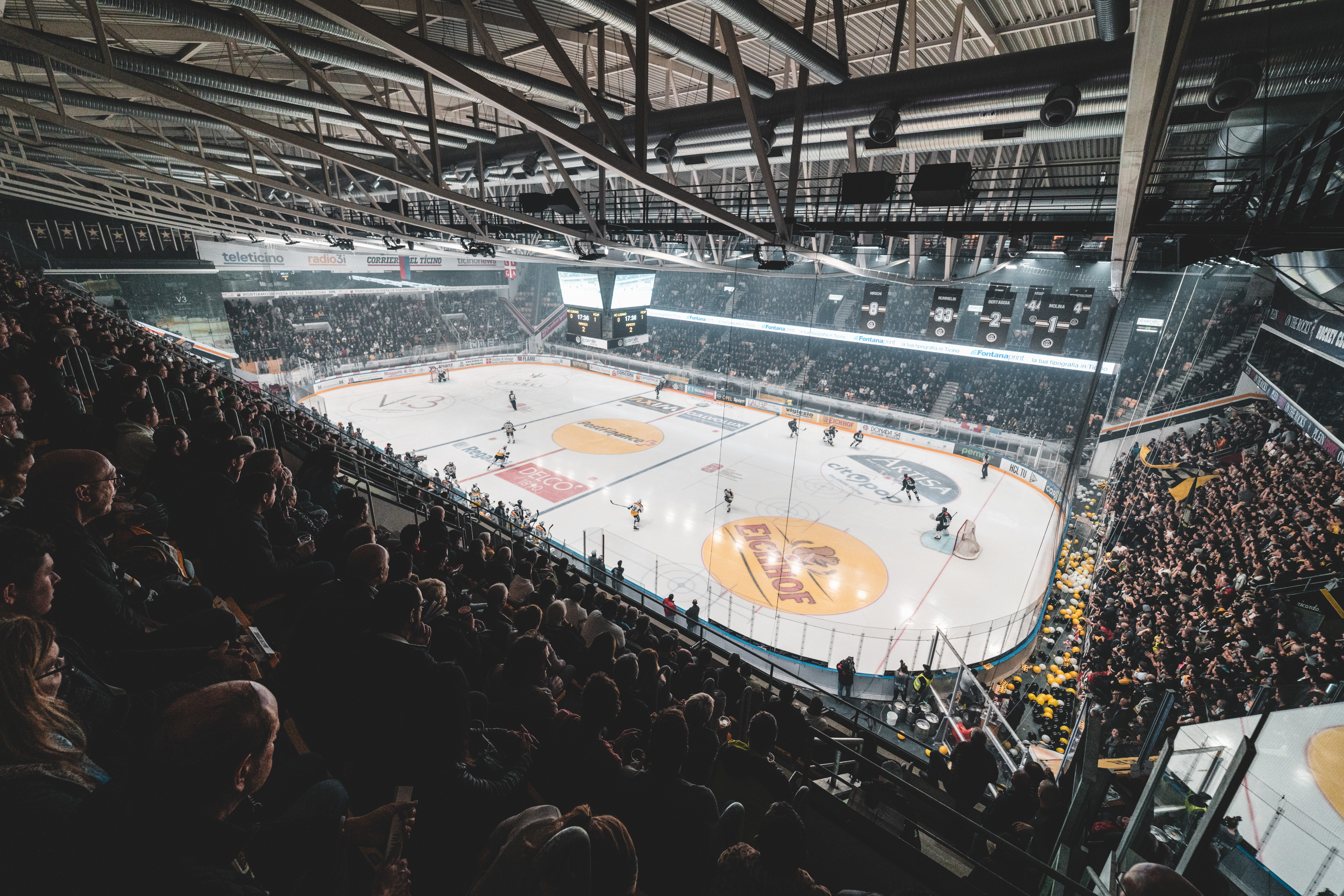
Hockey Club Lugano playing against HC Ambrì-Piotta at the Resega

Hockey Club Lugano (HCL) plays in the National League (NL), the top tier of Swiss hockey and is by far the town's number one team. They play at the Cornèr Arena and have won seven national titles, having participated twice in the European Cup final round and once in the top four final in the Euroleague. In 1991, Lugano reached the final of the Spengler Cup and twice reached third place in the IIHF Continental Cup Superfinal.

FC Lugano plays in the Swiss Super League. They play at the Stadio Cornaredo and won the Swiss title in 1938, 1941 and 1949 and the Swiss Cup in 1931, 1968, 1993 and 2022.

The Stadio Cornaredo currently sits 4,800 people. It hosted the Italy-Belgium match at the 1954 FIFA World Cup. According to some sources, Lugano is the smallest city ever to hold a World Cup match. Around the soccer field there is a gravel lane used during athletic contests and that, outside of official match and training hours, can be used by joggers free of charge. Next to the stadium are three small training fields. There are also two artificial grass fields: one for field hockey and one for soccer. There is also a skate park next to the stadium.

BC Lugano Tigers (former Basket Club Lugano) plays in the Swiss National League A (LNA). They play at the Elvetico gym, won the Swiss Cup in 2011 and have been Swiss LNA Champions in 2000, 2001, 2006 and 2010.

Lugano annually hosts the 20-kilometre (12 mi) racewalk Gran Premio Città di Lugano Memorial Albisetti and the Ladies Open Lugano, an International level WTA tennis tournament. The city hosted the 1953 and 1996 UCI Road World Championships, as well as the 18th Chess Olympiad.

Lugano has traditionally been one of Switzerland's hubs in Water polo. The Società Nuoto Lugano won the Swiss Championship a total of 17 times.

== People ==
=== People born in Lugano ===
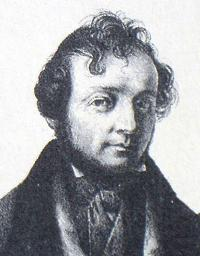
Domenico Reina

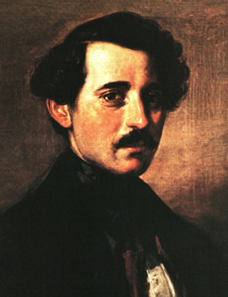
Carlo Bossoli

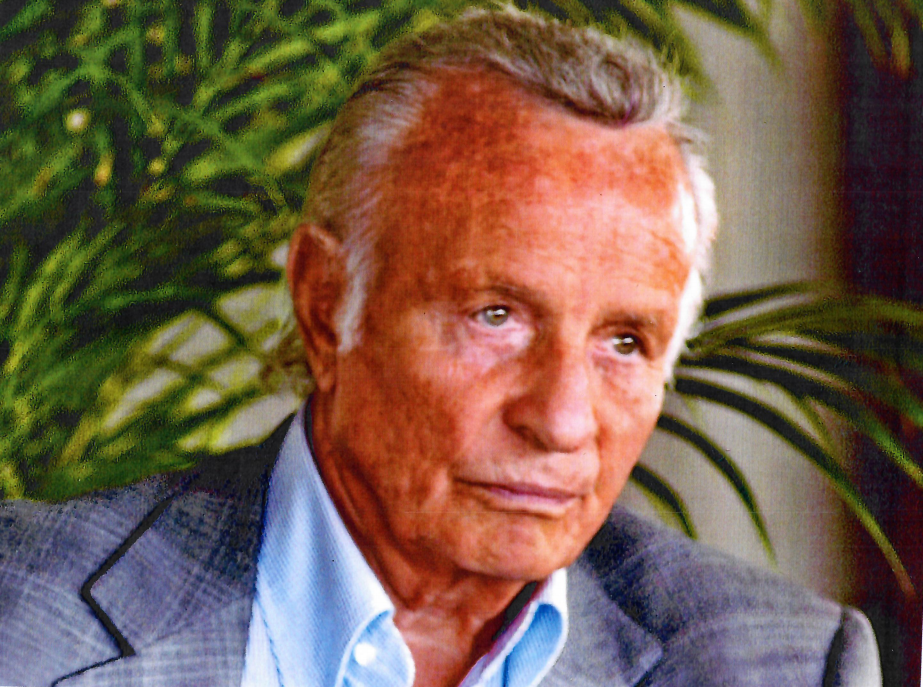
Sergio Mantegazza, 2018

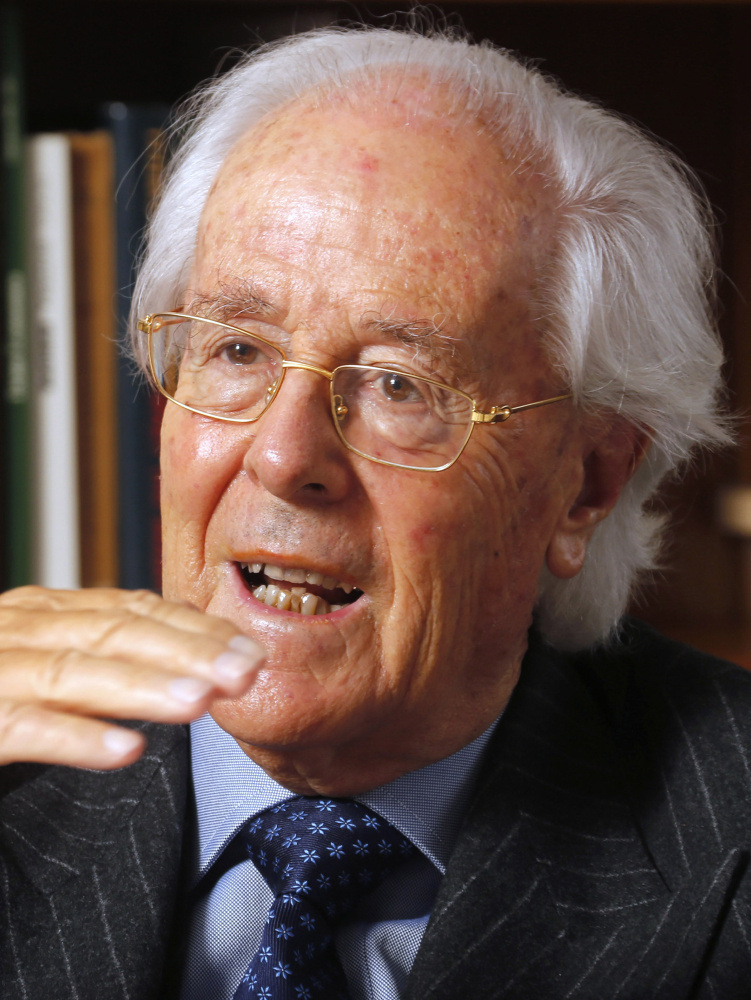
Tito Tettamanti, 2013

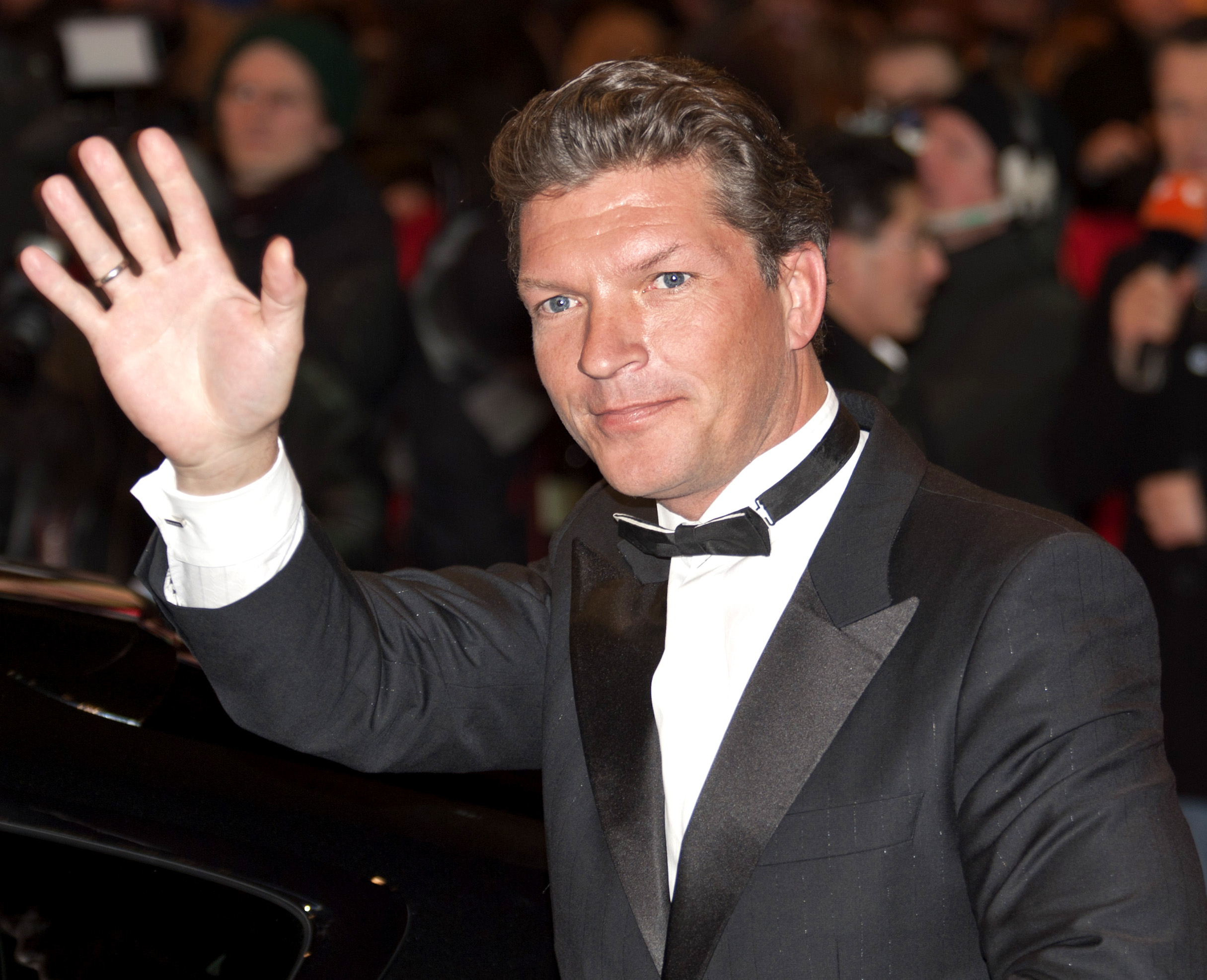
Hardy Krüger junior, 2011

==== Middle Ages ====
- Giovanni Battista Trevano (c.1560–1644), Italian-speaking architect who worked in Poland as a royal architect
- Francesco Contin (1585–1654), Swiss-Italian sculptor and architect
- Giovanni Battista Discepoli (1590–1660), Swiss-Italian painter of the Baroque period
- Gasparo Molo (15??-16??), goldsmith
- Karl Konrad von Beroldingen (1624–1706), Lugano's chancellor and general captain
- Carlo Giuseppe Plura (1663–1737), Swiss-Italian stucco artist and sculptor
- Giovanni Maria Fontana (c.1670–after 1712), Italian-Swiss architect, worked in Russia
- Giacomo Zanetti (c.1696–1735), Italian master builder and architect
- Domenico Reina (1796–1843), Swiss bel canto opera tenor and composer

==== 19th C ====
- Carlo Bossoli (1815–1884), Swiss-born Italian painter and lithographer of scenes from the Risorgimento
- Domenico Giambonini (1868–1956), Swiss sport shooter, bronze medallist in the 1920 Summer Olympics

==== 20th C ====
- Leonardo Conti MD (1900–1945), Reich Health Leader in Nazi Germany
- Romano Amerio (1905–1997), Catholic theologian
- Niccolò Tucci (1908–1999), short story writer and novelist who wrote in English and Italian
- Hans Zellweger (1909–1990), Paediatrician and clinical geneticist who described Zellweger syndrome
- Lauro Amadò (1912–1971), also known as Lajo, Swiss football player, played 54 games for the Swiss national football team
- Mario Agliati (1922–2011), Swiss-Italian journalist, writer and historian
- Mario Comensoli (1922–1993), Swiss painter of the realist movement
- Sergio Mantegazza (1927–2024), Swiss-Italian businessman, chairman and owner of Globus a multinational travel company.
- Duilio Arigoni (1928–2020), Swiss chemist, worked on the biosynthetic pathways of many organic natural substances
- Tito Tettamanti (born 1930), Swiss lawyer, politician, and entrepreneur
- Giulia Daneo Lorimer (1932–2021), Italian violinist and singer
- Pietro Balestra (1935–2005), Swiss economist specializing in econometrics
- Franco Ambrosetti (born 1941), jazz trumpeter, flugelhornist and composer
- Christian Giordano (1945–2018), Swiss anthropologist and sociologist
- Giorgio Giudici (born 1945), Swiss architect and politician, Mayor of Lugano 1984–2013
- Romolo Nottaris (born 1946), Swiss rock climber, mountaineer and author of documentary films
- Chiara Banchini (born 1946), Swiss Baroque violinist
- Loris Kessel (1950–2010), Swiss racing driver
- Georg Heinrich Thyssen-Bornemisza (1950–2022), manager
- Luca Pianca (born 1958), Swiss musician-lutenist whose specialty is archlute
- Diego Fasolis (born 1958), Swiss classical organist and conductor
- Marco Borradori (1959–2021), Swiss lawyer and politician, Mayor of Lugano 2013–2021
- Mauro Gianetti (born 1964), Swiss directeur sportif, former professional rider
- Gianluca Barilari (born 1964), head coach of the Swiss national basketball team
- Carlo Bonzanigo (born 1966), Italian and Swiss car designer, works for Pininfarina and for Citroen Design.
- Hardy Krüger Jr. (born 1968), German actor
- Antonio Esposito (born 1972), Swiss-Italian former footballer, 320 games
- Christian Rebecchi (born 1980), Swiss painter and sculptor of the NEVERCREW artists duo
- Joël Camathias (born 1981), Swiss racing driver
- Alberto Regazzoni (born 1983), footballer, with over 440 games and 3 for the national side
- Elly Schlein (born 1985), Italian politician
- Stefano Comini (born 1990), Swiss racing driver
- Alex Fontana (born 1992), Swiss racing driver

==== 21st C ====
- Nicole Vallario (born 2001), ice hockey player and member of the Swiss women's national hockey team.

=== People who lived or died in Lugano ===
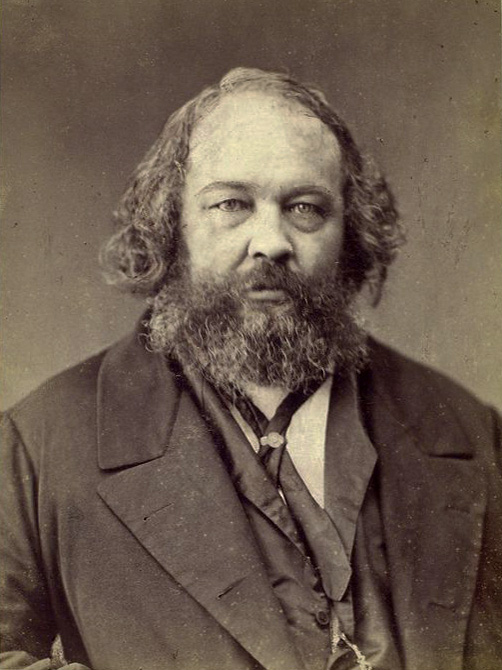
Mikhail Bakunin

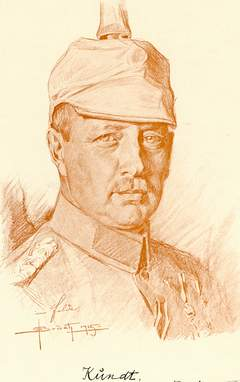
Hans Kundt, 1915

==== 19th C ====
- Mikhail Bakunin (1814–1876), Russian revolutionary anarchist and founder of collectivist anarchism
- Enrico Bignami (1844–1921), Italian merchant and editor of La Plebe, a socialist newspaper
- Ferdinando Fontana (1850–1919), Italian journalist, dramatist, poet and committed, passionate socialist
- Hans Kundt (1869–1939), German military officer, the primary military figure of Bolivia
- Heinrich Thyssen (1875–1947), German-Hungarian entrepreneur and art collector
- Hermann Hesse (1877–1962), author and philosopher, won the Nobel Prize in 1946
- Jurgis Šaulys (1879–1948), Lithuanian economist, diplomat and politician; one of the twenty signatories to the 1918 Act of Independence of Lithuania
- Wilhelm Backhaus (1884–1969), German pianist and pedagogue
- Alfred Neumann (1895–1952), German writer of novels, stories, poems, plays and films

==== 20th C ====
- Rudolf Caracciola (1901–1959), German racing driver
- Gustav Fröhlich (1902–1987), German actor and film director
- Ernst Marlier (1875–1948), German pharmaceutical manufacturer who built the Wannsee Villa, the venue of the Wannsee Conference
- Rainis (1865–1929), Latvian poet, playwright, translator, and politician
- Aspazija (1865–1943), Latvian poet and playwright
- Mariuccia Medici (1910–2012), Italian-born Swiss actress on TV and in the theatre
- Caterina Valente (1931–2024), Italian-French, multilingual singer, guitarist, dancer, and actress
- Mina (born 1940), Italian singer
- Steve Reid (1944–2010), American jazz drummer and session drummer for Motown
- Robert Palmer (1949–2003), English singer-songwriter, musician and record producer
- Behgjet Pacolli (born 1951), former President of Kosovo, a businessman with Mabetex Group
- Ivo Pogorelić (born 1958), Croatian pianist
- Johann Sebastian Paetsch (born 1964), American cellist and musician
- Anna Kravtchenko (born 1976), Ukrainian classical pianist with an international career
- Alberto Contador (born 1982), Spanish professional cyclist, winner of the Tour de France, Vuelta a España and Giro d'Italia
- Nicole Cooke MBE (born 1983), Welsh former professional road bicycle racer, Commonwealth, Olympic and World road race champion

== Twin towns ==
- Podgorica, Montenegro
- Hegyvidék, Hungary

== See also ==
- Canton of Lugano
- Cities of Switzerland
- Tourism in Switzerland
