= Autolinee Regionali Luganesi =

Swiss transport operator

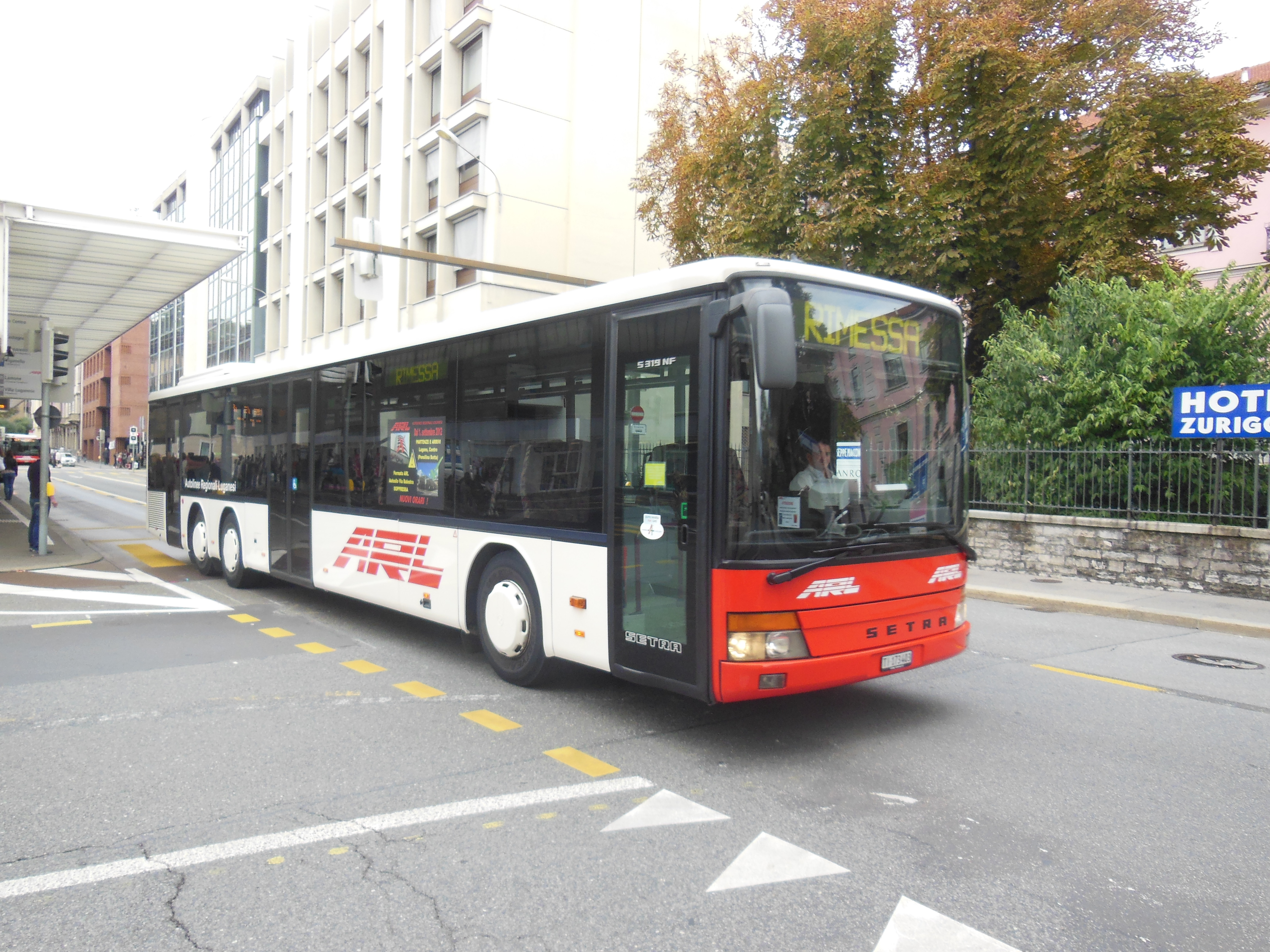
- An ARL bus in Central Lugano
- Industry: Transport
- Headquarters: Lugano, Switzerland
- Area served: Lugano and surrounding region
- Website: arlsa.ch

Autolinee Regionali Luganesi (ARL) is a public transport operator in the region around the Swiss city of Lugano. It operates bus services from Lugano to various outer-suburban communities. There is some overlap in terms of places served with the Trasporti Pubblici Luganesi (TPL), the Lugano city bus operator, and Autopostale, the regional post bus operator.

The company was formed by the merger of the bus services of the Lugano–Tesserete railway and Lugano–Cadro–Dino railway.

Today the company operates three routes (frequency may be reduced on weekends and evenings):

Route	Description	Frequency
60	( Lugano Cornaredo – Canobbio – Davesco – ) Cadro – Villa Luganese	10 per day
441	Central Lugano – Canobbio – Comano – Cureglia – Cadempino	2 per hour
461	Tesserete – Lugaggia – Canobbio – Porza – Central Lugano – Viganello – Pregassona – Soragno – Davesco – Cadro – Sonvico – Villa Luganese	2 per hour

== See also ==
- Transport in Switzerland
- List of bus operating companies in Switzerland
