= Trolleybuses in Lugano =

Lugano trolleybus system
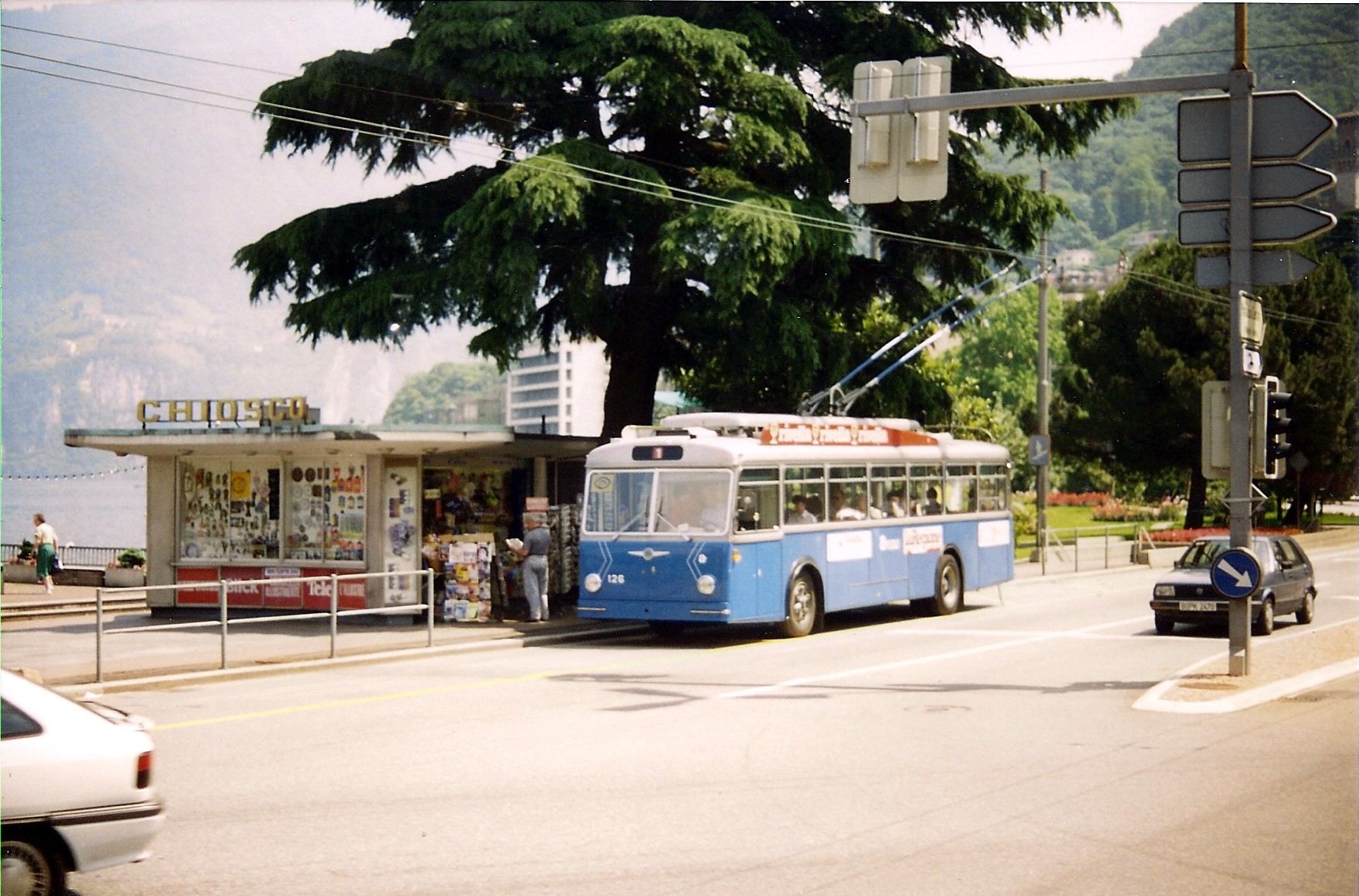
- Lugano trolleybus no. 126 in 1994.

Operation
- Locale: Lugano, Switzerland
- Open: 25 April 1954
- Close: 28 June 2001
- Status: Closed
- Routes: 4 (max)
- Operators: 1954–1969: Azienda Comunale del Traffico (ACT); 1969–1999: Azienda Comunale dei Trasporti della Città di Lugano (ACT); 2000–2001: Trasporti Pubblici Luganesi (TPL)

Infrastructure
- Electrification: 1,000 V DC

Statistics
Overview

The Lugano trolleybus system (Italian: Rete filoviaria di Lugano) was a trolleybus system that formed part of the public transport network of Lugano, in the canton of Ticino, Switzerland, for nearly half a century. Opened in 1954, the system had progressively replaced the Lugano tramway network by 1959, and was significantly expanded between 1975 and 1981. However, it was closed in 2001, and the overhead wires had been completely removed by the summer of 2002.

At its height, the system consisted of four lines. From its opening until the end of 1999, it was operated by Azienda Comunale dei Trasporti della Città di Lugano (ACT) (which was called the Azienda Comunale del Traffico (also ACT) until 1969). Trasporti Pubblici Luganesi S.A. (TPL) took over on 1 January 2000.

== History and routes ==
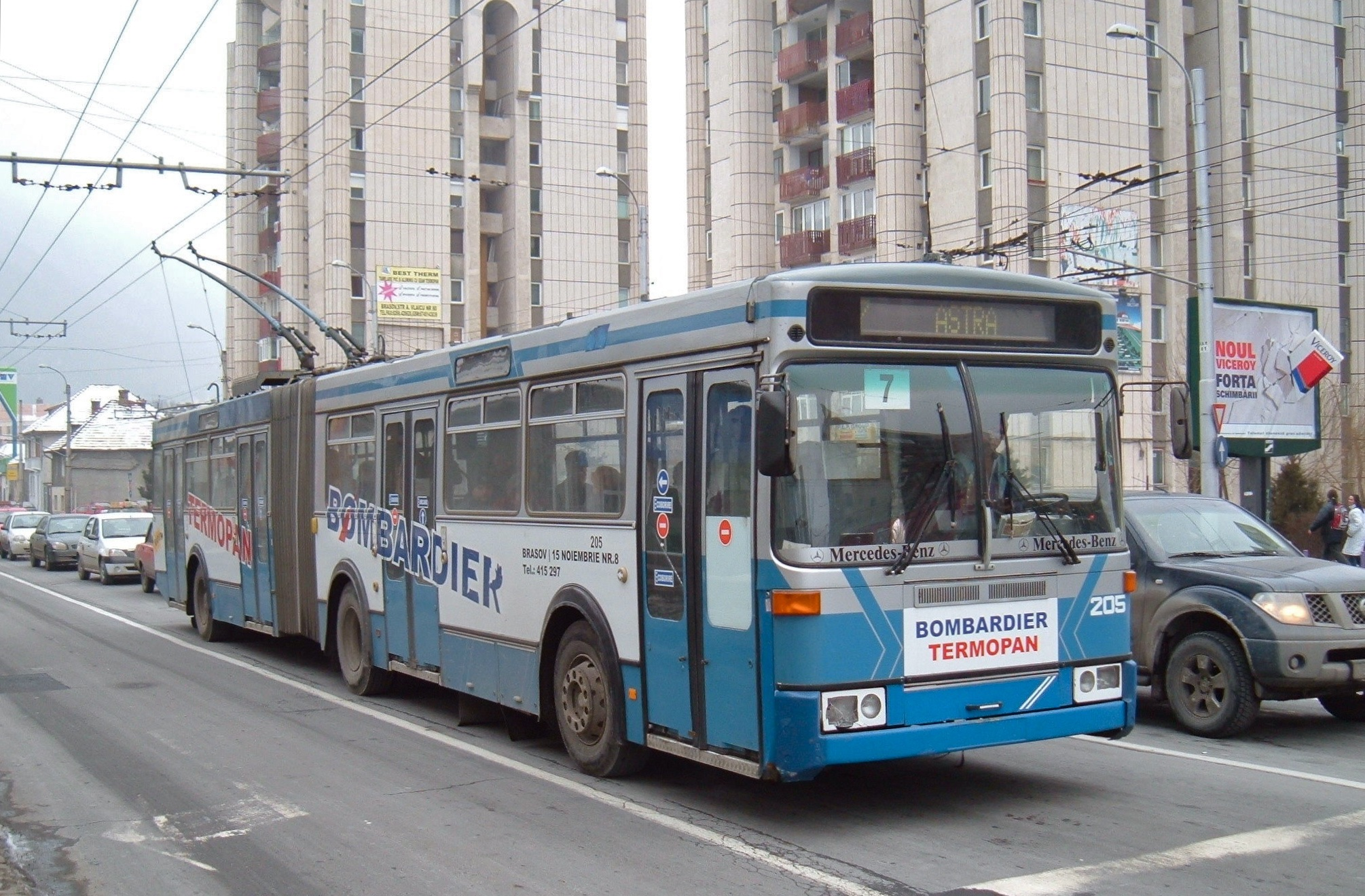
Ex-Lugano trolleybus 205 in service in Brașov in 2006

The Lugano trolleybus system was one of the last trolleybus systems to be opened in Switzerland. Only the Montreux/Vevey system (1957) and the Schaffhausen system (1966) were opened later.

Initially, the Lugano system was made up only of routes converted from tramway lines. The first trolleybus route, opened on 25 April 1954, ran from the centre of Lugano to Cinque Vie, which is located in a hilly area. Another trolleybus route was put into operation in the autumn of 1959, between central Lugano and Castagnola. At the end of that year, a route to Paradiso was opened (its turning loop was put into operation a year later). Also in 1959, a route was opened to Cornareda, at which a trolleybus depot was built. Not until 1963, with the opening of the Massagno–Crocifisso route (later extended to Vezia), did the system expand to include a route that had not previously been powered by overhead wires.

Following a reorganisation of the system in 1972, the system's network, consisting of three routes with a cumulative length of 13.4 km (8.3 mi), was:

1/2	Castagnola–Centro–Paradiso	Cross-city route
3/4	Breganzona–Centro–Pregassona	Cross-city route
5/6	Centro–Massagno–Savosa–Vezia	Radial route

In 1975, ACT built an extension from Cinque Vie to Breganzona. A year later another new section was opened: the route to Cornareda was extended to the new quarter of Pregassona, which is located on a hill above the city. In 1980, a new trolleybus depot was built, and connected to this extension. The old depot became the local workshops of a transport company. The last new trolleybus route to be opened in Lugano was an extension of the Crocifisso route to Vezia.

Until 1993, each route was assigned two different numbers, one of which was displayed by vehicles running in one direction, the other by vehicles travelling in the opposite direction. In 1993, this relatively uncommon practice was discontinued. Thereafter, the trolleybus routes were as follows:

1	Castagnola– city centre – Paradiso	Cross-city route
3	Piazza Manzoni (city centre) – Pregassona	Radial route
4	Piazza Manzoni – Breganzona	Radial route
5	Piazza Manzoni – Vezia	Radial route

In 2000, the new operator, TPL, decided to close the system. The last day of trolleybus operation was Thursday, 28 June 2001, with trolleybuses running on routes 3 and 5 on the final day. Route 1's trolleybuses had been replaced by motorbuses a few weeks earlier, due to road construction. Use of trolleybuses on route 4 had ended some time earlier.

One of the main reasons given for the decision to close the system was its worn-out fleet. The other was the system's high voltage (see section below), given that few or no manufacturers were interested in supplying new trolleybuses capable of operating at such a high voltage. The same problem had also been cited several years earlier, and by at least 1995 ACT had begun considering closure of the system. Another reason for the closure is that maintenance of the system's vehicles and infrastructure had been run down in the 1990s. As a result, the Federal Office of Transport had started to grant only temporary operating authorizations, and continued operation would have been subject to various conditions.

After the closure of the system, trolleybuses 201 and 203–209 were sold to a dealer of used buses and trolleybuses in Romania, who in turn sold them to the city of Brașov in Romania, where they operated in service for several more years, the last ones being withdrawn around 2010. Nos. 101, 112, 124 and 126 were acquired by the Trolleybusverein Schweiz (Swiss Trolleybus Society) (TVS) for preservation, as was the FIAT catenary maintenance truck no. 67, built in 1963.

== Fleet ==
The following 36 trolleybuses were procured for the Lugano trolleybus system over the course of its life:

Numbers	Quantity	Manufacturer	Electrical equipment	Built	Configuration	Notes
101–103	3	FBW / Ramseier + Jenzer	SAAS	1954	Two-axle	Withdrawn 1975.
104–113	10	FBW / Bosia	SAAS	1960	Two-axle	Nos. 104–111 and 113 withdrawn 1975; no. 112 used for driver training from 1988.
114–117	4	FBW / Ramseier & Jenzer / Lepori	SAAS	1966	Two-axle	No. 116 ended its service as a spare parts donor.
118–121	4	Volvo / Hess	SAAS	1974	Two-axle	Two vehicles ended their service as spare parts donors.
122–125	4	Volvo / Hess	SAAS	1975	Articulated	
126–127	2	FBW / Hess	SAAS	1966	Two-axle	Taken over from Altstätten–Berneck trolleybus system in 1978 (nos. 6 and 7 on that system).
201–206	6	Vetter	BBC	1985–87	Articulated	No. 202 withdrawn in December 1992 after fire.
207–209	3	Vetter	ABB	1987–88	Two-axle	

== Unusual voltage ==
An unusual feature of the system was that it was energised at an unusually high 1,000 V DC, the voltage previously used by the tramway network. In both cases, the reason for the higher than usual voltage was that it avoided voltage problems at crossing points with three railways, the Lugano–Tesserete railway, the Lugano–Cadro–Dino railway and the Lugano–Ponte Tresa railway.

Trolleybuses are normally built to run at voltages of 600 V or 750 V, and Lugano's high voltage was very non-standard. It was one of only three Swiss systems to use 1,000 V or higher – the others being the rural Altstätten–Berneck system, which closed in 1977, and the 1,100 V Thun–Beatenbucht trolleybus system (STI), which closed in 1982 – and Lugano's was the last trolleybus system anywhere to use that voltage.

== See also ==
- List of trolleybus systems in Switzerland
