= Trolleybuses in Bern =

Public transport system in Bern, Switzerland

Bern trolleybus system
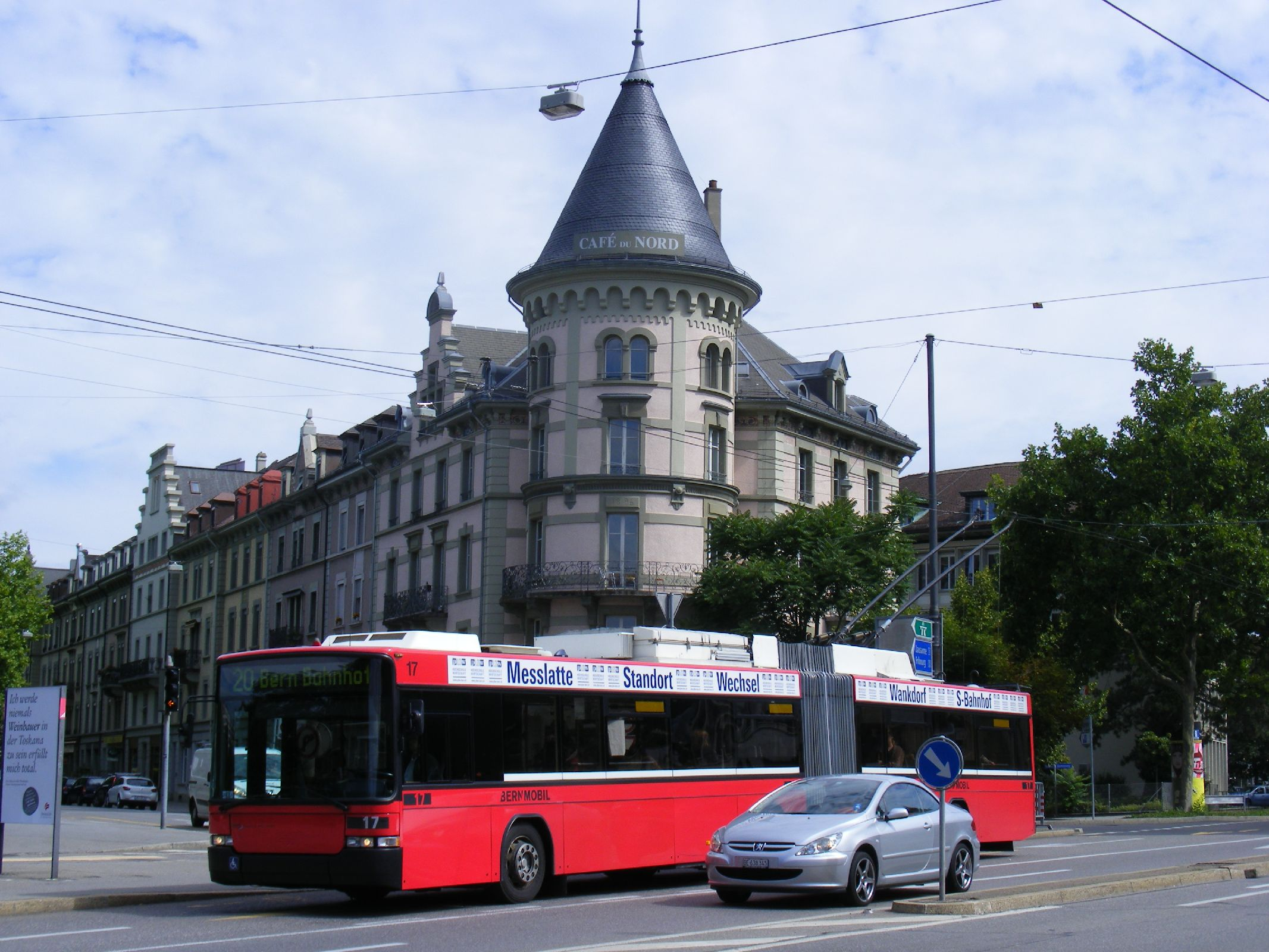
- Bernmobil trolleybus no. 17 on line 20, July 2011

Operation
- Locale: Bern, Switzerland
- Open: 29 October 1940
- Status: Open
- Routes: 3
- Operator: Bernmobil

Infrastructure
- Electrification: 600 V DC
- Stock: 20

Statistics
- Route length: 21.7 km (13.5 mi)
- 2010: 21,762,000
Overview
- Website: http://www.bernmobil.ch Bernmobil (in German)

The Bern trolleybus system (Alemannic German: Trolleybussystem Bern) is part of the public transport network of Bern, the capital city of Switzerland. Opened in 1940, it combines with the Bern S-Bahn, the Bern tramway network and Bern's urban motorbus network to form an integrated all-four style scheme.

As of 2012, the system consists of three lines, 35 stops, and a total route length of 21.7 km (13.5 mi). It is operated by Städtische Verkehrsbetriebe Bern (SVB) (better known since 2000 by its trading name, Bernmobil), which also operates the tramway and motorbus networks. Like the other modes of public transport in the region, it is covered by the Tarifverbund Bern-Solothurn.

== History ==
On 2 and 3 December 1939, the City of Bern's voters decided to introduce trolleybuses as a third form of urban public transport. The Bern trolleybus system went into operation on 29 October 1940 on line 12, between Bärengraben and Schosshalde, and served initially only as a tramway feeder. The body initially responsible for running the new trolleybus system was the Städtische Strassenbahn Bern (SSB), while Stadt-Omnibus Bern (SOB) ran the city's motor bus services. Only on 1 September 1947 did the two companies merge, to form Städtische Verkehrsbetriebe Bern (SVB).

On 22 January 1941, the then 4.22 km (2.62 mi) long trolleybus line 12 finally took over the Bahnhof Bern–Bärengraben section of tram line 8. On 5 July 1941, due to wartime fuel shortages, the 3.7 km (2.3 mi) long motor bus line to Bümpliz was converted into a trolleybus line. To avoid intersections between the trolleybus and tram lines, passengers using trolleybuses to travel into and out of the inner city had to change modes of transport at the Insel tram/bus stop.

On 9 May 1948, the Bümpliz line was converted back to motor bus operation. In 1961, the Bahnhof Bern–Länggasse motor bus line was electrified to become part of trolleybus line 12. Until 1959, this route had been a tram line, and had connected with trolleybus line 12 to the Schosshalde. On 24 September 1972, the voters said "yes" to a template for the electrification of three further motor bus routes:

- Line 14 Bahnhof Bern–Bümpliz Unterführung–Gäbelbach on 27 October 1974;
- Line 20 Bahnhof Bern–Bahnhof Wankdorf on 15 April 1975
- Line 13 Bahnhof Bern–Bümpliz Unterführung (underpass)–Bümpliz on 28 July 1975.

Lines 13 and 14 were also extended in the course of electrification. Additionally, line 11 was opened on 18 May 1977, as a trolleybus line from Güterbahnhof (goods station) to Brückfeld. On 5 May 1992, this line was extended again, for nearly half a kilometre, to the new Neufeld P+R facility.

The most recent network expansion, opened on 20 June 2005, was an extension of line 12 of approximately 650 m (2,130 ft), from Schosshalde to Zentrum Paul Klee. On 1 July of that year, the trolleybus system then shrank significantly, as lines 13 and 14 were temporarily converted to motor bus operation during the project Tram Bern-West, until 2010, when the tramway network took over the operation of these two western branches.

In 2010, the Bern trolleybus system yielded the following statistics:

- Kilometres travelled: 1.439 million, representing 15 percent of Bernmobil's total transport volume
- Passengers carried: 21.762 million, representing 23 percent of Bernmobil's transport volume
- Passenger kilometers: 29.376 million, representing 16 percent of Bernmobil's total transport volume

== Lines ==
The present system is made up of the following lines:

11	Holligen–Bahnhof Bern–Bollwerk–Brückfeld–Neufeld P+R	Cross-city route	11 stops	6-minute intervals
12	Länggasse–Bahnhof Bern–Schosshalde–Zentrum Paul Klee	Cross-city route	17 stops	6-minute intervals
20	Bahnhof Bern–Bollwerk–Wyleregg–Bahnhof Wankdorf	Radial route	10 stops	5-minute intervals

Due to the lack of a turning circle at Wyleregg, the supplementary services that run on line 20 on school days are operated by diesel buses.

== Fleet ==
=== Retired fleet ===
Fleet nos	Qty	Built	In service	Manufacturer	Electrics	Type	Notes
1, 2, 9–12	6	1940–1941	1940–1966	FBW / Ramseier & Jenzer / Gangloff	BBC / MFO	1	Rigid
3–8	6	1940–1941	1940–1965	Saurer / Gangloff	MFO	4 TP	Rigid
13–16	4	1942	1942–1966	FBW / Gangloff	BBC	2	Rigid
17	1	1942	1942–1967	Saurer / Ramseier & Jenzer	MFO	4 TP	Rigid
21–29	9	1961	1961–1998	FBW / Gangloff / Ramseier & Jenzer	MFO	51	Articulated, nickname Flipperkasten ("pinball tables")
30–55	26	1974	1974–2006	FBW / Hess / Ramseier & Jenzer / Gangloff	SAAS	91 GTL	Articulated(1)
56–61	6	1977	1977–2006	FBW / Hess	SAAS	91 GTL	Articulated
62–66	5	1985	1985–2009	Volvo / Ramseier & Jenzer	BBC	B10M	Articulated(2)
67–69	3	1974	1992–1994	FBW / Hess	SAAS	91 GTS	Articulated(3)
–	1	1991	1991	NAW / Hess	BBC	BGT-N	Articulated, low-floor(4)

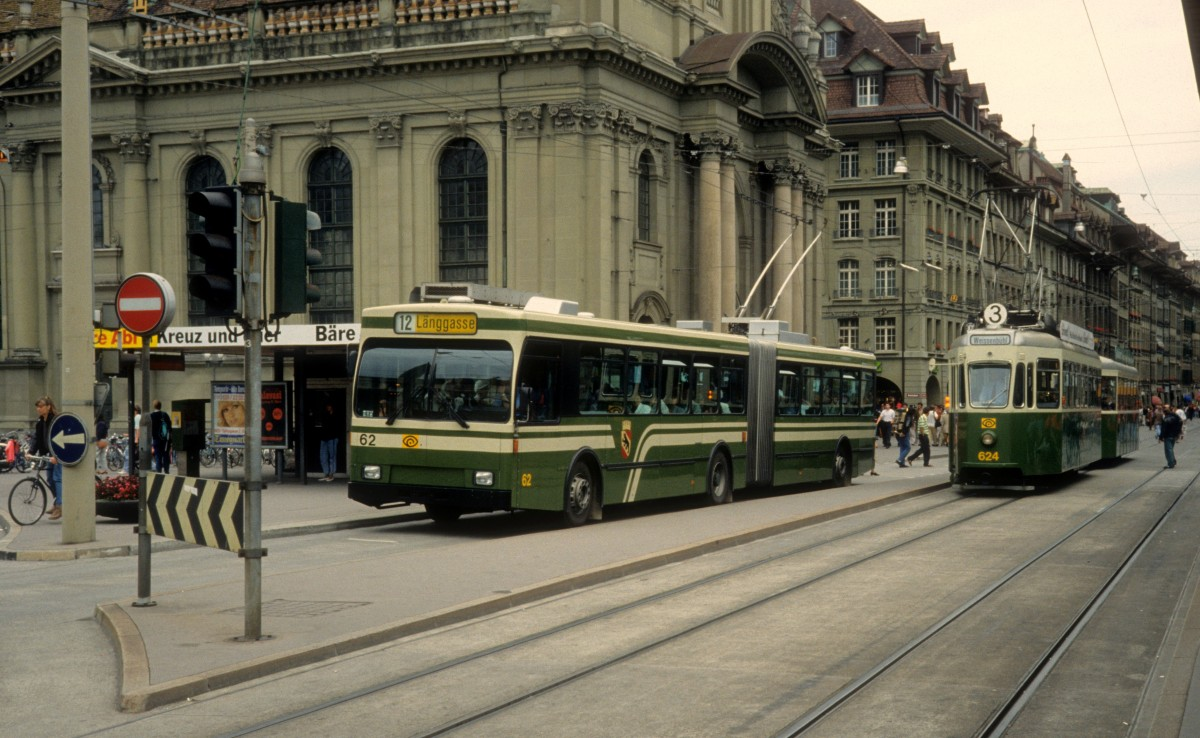
Trolleybus 62 and tram 624 in 1990, in the olive-green colour that was prominent in the SVB livery for many years prior to the 2000s

(1) = Prior to entering service in Bern, trolleybus no. 30 was a demonstration vehicle for the Swiss trolleybus manufacturing, both domestically and abroad, for example, in Vancouver. After a heating unit failure, it was burned out in 1976, but was rebuilt in 1977 in the SVB workshop. Later, trolleybus no. 55 was used as a demonstration in Solingen and Arnhem, amongst other places.

(2) = Joint order with articulated buses nos. 61-70 of the Biel/Bienne trolleybus system.

(3) = Lent by the Neuchâtel trolleybus system, and used during the winters of 1992–93 and 1993–94. A proposed acquisition of these vehicles did not occur. No. 67 was formerly Neuchâtel 156, no. 68 was Neuchâtel 158, and no. 69 was Neuchâtel 160.

(4) = BGT-N demonstration vehicle, used on all of the Swiss trolleybus systems, except the Lugano system.

Additionally, between 1943 and 1960 a Saurer/Gangloff Type 4R trailer was in the fleet. It was purchased by Stadt-Omnibus Bern, initially bore the number 101, and in 1956 was renumbered as 201. The trailer was used with both trolleybuses and motorbuses, trolleybus no. 6 and motorbuses nos. 54 and 55 being equipped for towing it.

=== Preservation ===
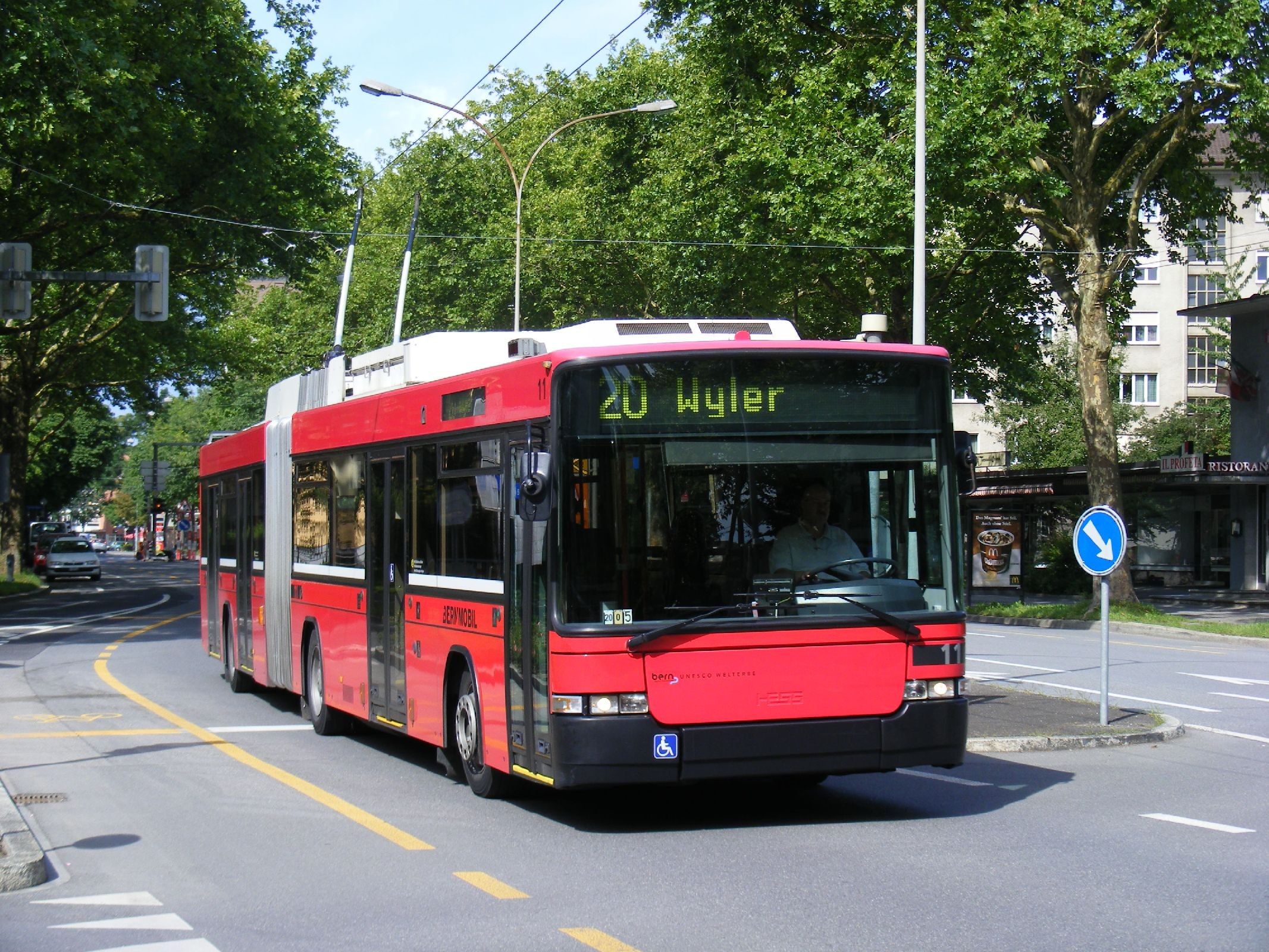
A Hess Swisstrolley in Bern, 2011.

In 2006, the eleven vehicles with the fleet numbers 33, 34, 46, 53, 54 and 56 to 61 were delivered to the Brașov trolleybus system in Romania, where they are still in service.

Former Bernese trolleybuses nos. 13, 28 and 59 are now in the custody of the Tramvereins Bern (TVB) ("Bern Tram Association"), and trolleybus no. 38 is now owned by the Trolleybusvereins Schweiz (TVS) ("Switzerland Trolleybus Association"). Trolleybus no. 55 has been sent to the Obus-Museum Solingen e. V. ("Solingen Trolleybus Museum") in Germany, and is the only one of the five preserved Bernese trolley buses still in running order.

=== Current fleet ===
The Bern trolleybus system has a fleet of 20 vehicles. They are all BGT-N2 low-floor articulated buses with electrical equipment by Kiepe. Also known as Swisstrolley 2s, they were purchased in two groups:

- Nos. 1 to 8: 1997–1998
- Nos. 9 to 20: 1999–2000

== See also ==
- List of trolleybus systems in Switzerland
