= Charles Albert on the Balcony of Casa Greppi =

Painting by Carlo Bossoli

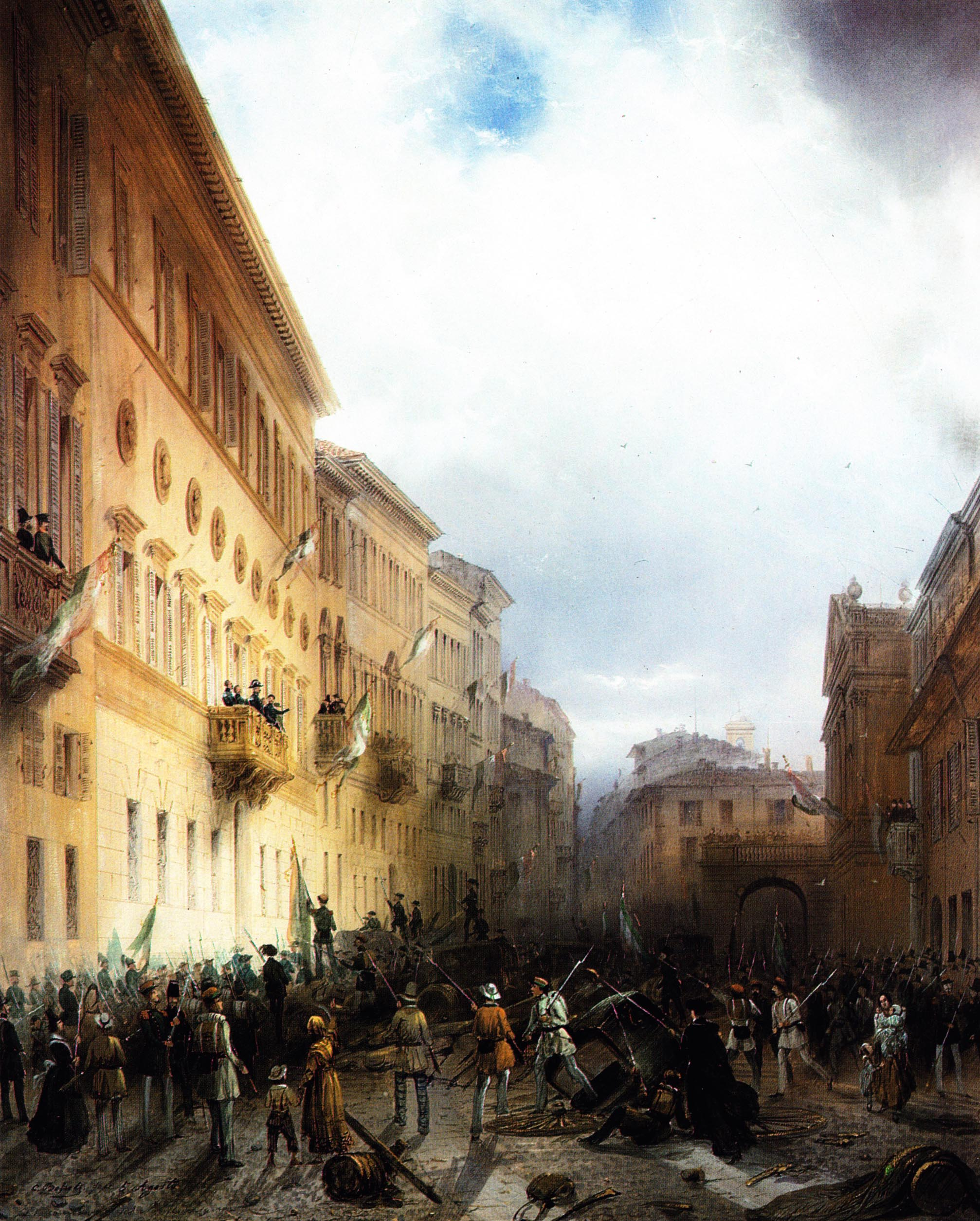
- Artist: Carlo Bossoli
- Year: 1860
- Type: Oil on canvas, history painting
- Dimensions: 73 cm × 58.8 cm (29 in × 23.1 in)
- Location: Museum of the Risorgimento; Milan

Charles Albert on the Balcony of Casa Greppi (Italian: Carlo Alberto dal balcone di casa Greppi) is an 1860 history painting by the Swiss-born Italian artist Carlo Bossoli. It depicts a scene from during the Revolution of 1848, considered a part of the First Italian War of Independence, a stage in the wider Risorgimento. Following the Five Days of Milan, a major uprising against Austrian rule forced Count Radetzky to retreat from the city. Some months later as the ruler of neighbouring Kingdom of Sardinia appeared on the balcony of the Casa Greppi to address the crowds, who were hostile to any suggestion of surrender as Radetzky returned with massive reinforcements. The painting is now in the collection of the Museum of the Risorgimento in Milan.

== Bibliography ==
- Rapelli, Paola. Symbols of Power in Art. Getty Publications, 2011.
