= Jeux sans frontières season 27 =

Jeux sans frontières
- Season 27
- No. of teams: 6 countries
- Winner: (Hungary) Kecskemét
- Runner-up: (Portugal) Lamego
- Location: Stupinigi, Italy
- Head referee: Denis Pettiaux
- No. of episodes: 10

Release
- Original release: June 1996 – September 1996

Season chronology
- ← Previous; Season 26 Next → Season 28

The 27th season of the international television game show Jeux sans frontières was held in the summer of 1996. Broadcasters from Greece, Hungary, Italy, Portugal, Slovenia, and Switzerland participated in the competition coordinated by the European Broadcasting Union (EBU). RAI hosted all heats and the final at the grounds of the Palazzina di caccia in Stupinigi (Italy). The head international referee in charge of supervising the competition was Denis Pettiaux.

The season was won by the team from Kecskemét, Hungary, being the runner-up the team from Lamego, Portugal.

== Participants ==
Country	Broadcasters	Code	Colour
Greece	ERT	GR	Blue
Hungary	MTV	H	Yellow
Italy	RAI	I	White
Portugal	RTP	P	Green
Slovenia	RTVSLO	SLO	Pink
Switzerland	SRG SSR	CH	Red

== Heats ==
=== Heat 1 ===
Place	Country	Town	Points
1	SLO	Novo Mesto	58
2	H	Hajdúszoboszló	46
3	CH	Genestrerio	43
3	I	Sulmona	43
5	P	Amadora	34
6	GR	Zakynthos	32

=== Heat 2 ===
Place	Country	Town	Points
1	P	Moura	58
2	H	Eger	57
3	CH	Losone	42
3	SLO	Kranjska Gora	42
5	I	Tolentino	31
6	GR	Kilkis	30

=== Heat 3 ===
Place	Country	Town	Points
1	I	Gran San Bernardo	52
2	H	Érd	46
3	CH	Pregassona	45
3	P	Funchal	45
5	GR	Kerkyra	43
6	SLO	Kranj	36

=== Heat 4 ===
Place	Country	Town	Points
1	SLO	Bohinj	53
2	H	Tiszaújváros	49
3	I	Torino	45
4	P	Águeda	42
5	GR	Tinos	39
6	CH	Ponte Tresa	32

=== Heat 5 ===
Place	Country	Town	Points
1	P	Vila Franca de Xira	58
2	SLO	Mengeš	52
3	GR	Kalymnos	43
4	H	Göd	38
5	CH	Disentis/Mustér	35
5	I	Gallipoli	35

=== Heat 6 ===
Place	Country	Town	Points
1	P	Lamego	62
2	SLO	Radenci	57
3	I	Catanzaro	43
4	GR	Athens	40
5	CH	Chironico	36
6	H	Belváros - Lipótváros	26

=== Heat 7 ===
Place	Country	Town	Points
1	CH	Malvaglia	49
2	P	Albufeira	48
3	H	Százhalombatta	46
4	SLO	Dobrepolje	42
5	I	Nicolosi	41
6	GR	Peristeri	35

=== Heat 8 ===
Place	Country	Town	Points
1	SLO	Iška vas	57
2	P	Ponta Delgada	55
3	H	Budapest	49
4	I	Abano Terme	45
5	CH	Ceresio	29
6	GR	Kalamata	23

=== Heat 9 ===
Place	Country	Town	Points
1	H	Kecskemét	60
2	SLO	Železniki	55
3	I	Cascina	47
3	P	Gondomar	47
5	GR	Neo Psychiko	28
–	CH	Lumino	–

Lumino from Switzerland withdrew after the first game, in which one of their members was injured.

=== Qualifiers ===
The teams which qualified from each country to the final were:

Country	Town	Place won	Points won
CH	Malvaglia	1	49
GR	Kalymnos	3	43
H	Kecskemét	1	60
I	Gran San Bernardo	1	52
P	Lamego	1	62
SLO	Novo Mesto	1	58

== Final ==
Place	Country	Town	Points
1	H	Kecskemét	54
2	P	Lamego	51
3	I	Gran San Bernardo	50
4	SLO	Novo Mesto	42
5	CH	Malvaglia	34
6	GR	Kalymnos	32
