= Massagno =

- Municipality
- Flag Coat of arms
- Location of Massagno
- Location within Switzerland Location within Canton of Ticino
- Coordinates: 46°1′N 8°57′E
- Country: Switzerland
- Canton: Ticino
- District: Lugano

Government
  - Mayor: Sindaca; Simona Rusconi Il Centro (as of February 2024)

Area
  - Total: 0.73 km^{2} (0.28 sq mi)
- Elevation: 352 m (1,155 ft)

Population (December 2007)
  - Total: 5,937
  - Density: 8,100/km^{2} (21,000/sq mi)
- Time zone: UTC+01:00 (CET)
  - Summer (DST): UTC+02:00 (CEST)
- Postal code: 6900, 6908
- SFOS number: 5196
- ISO 3166 code: CH-TI
- Surrounded by: Lugano, Savosa
- Twin towns: Onex (Switzerland)
- Website: www.massagno.ch

Massagno is a municipality in the district of Lugano in the canton of Ticino in Switzerland.

== History ==
An Upper Paleolithic Ax made out of serpentinite, and some cremation graves from the Iron Age are the only prehistoric traces discovered in Massagno. The village of Massagno is first mentioned in 1146 as Masagnio. In 1198 it was mentioned as Maxanio.

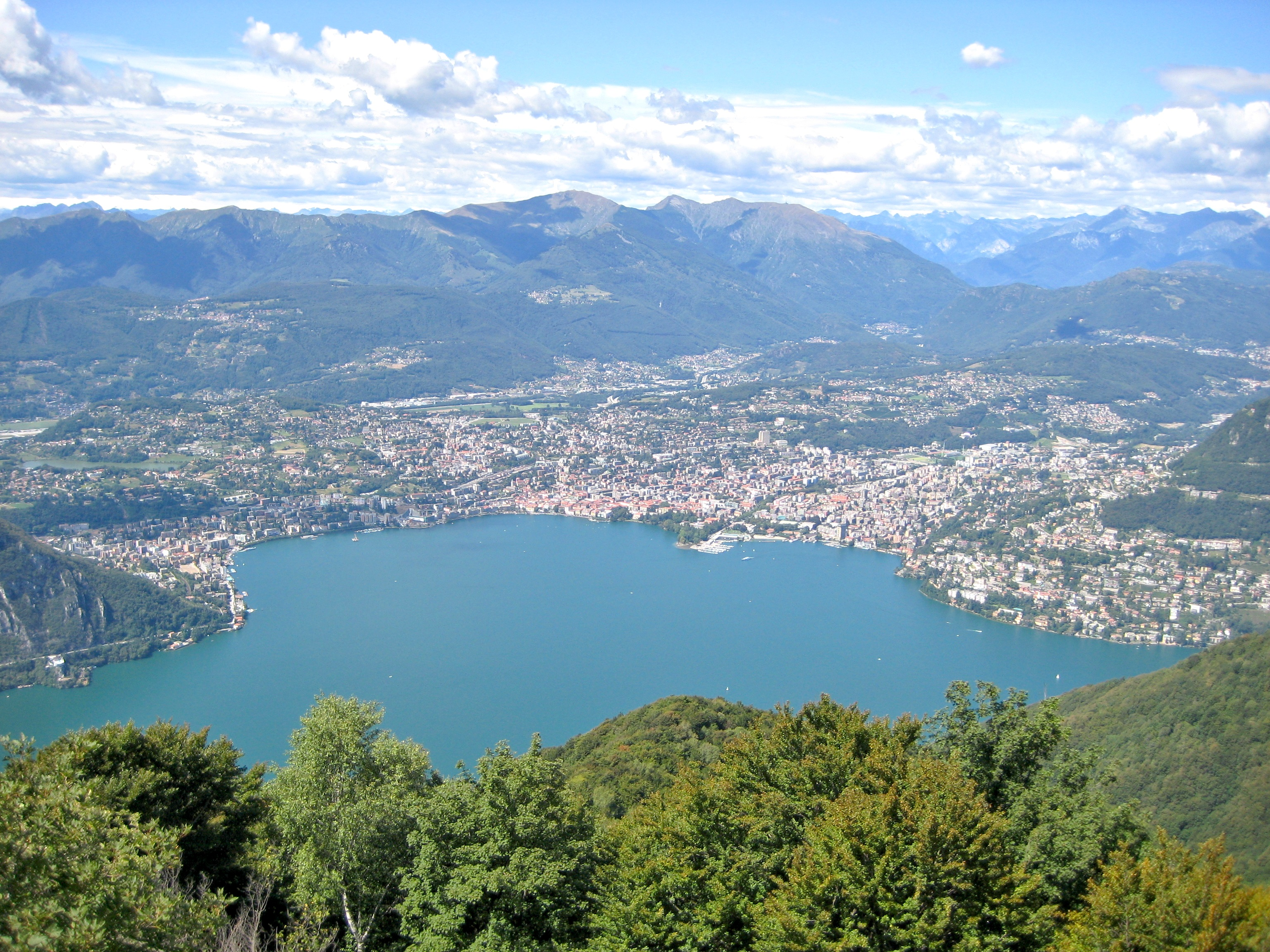
Massagno and Lugano from Mt. Sighignola, showing the crescent of building around the Lake Lugano

The Vicinanza of Massagno emerged from the villages of Massagno and Gerso, and during the Middle Ages it was part of the Pieve of Lugano. During the 9th and 10th centuries, the Cathedral of S. Lorenzo in Lugano seems to have owned individual farms and houses in the village, and in 1198 it was the main landholder. At the same time, the Kastlanei Sonvico owned some estates. In 1262 the hospital of St. Mary of Lugano acquired some estates as well, which were sold in 1739 to the Luvini family in Massagno. In 1329, the provost of the Humiliati monastery of S . Antonio in Lugano bought land in the village. Then, in the 14th century, the Bishop of Como acquired the right to tithe in Massagno and land in Gerso.

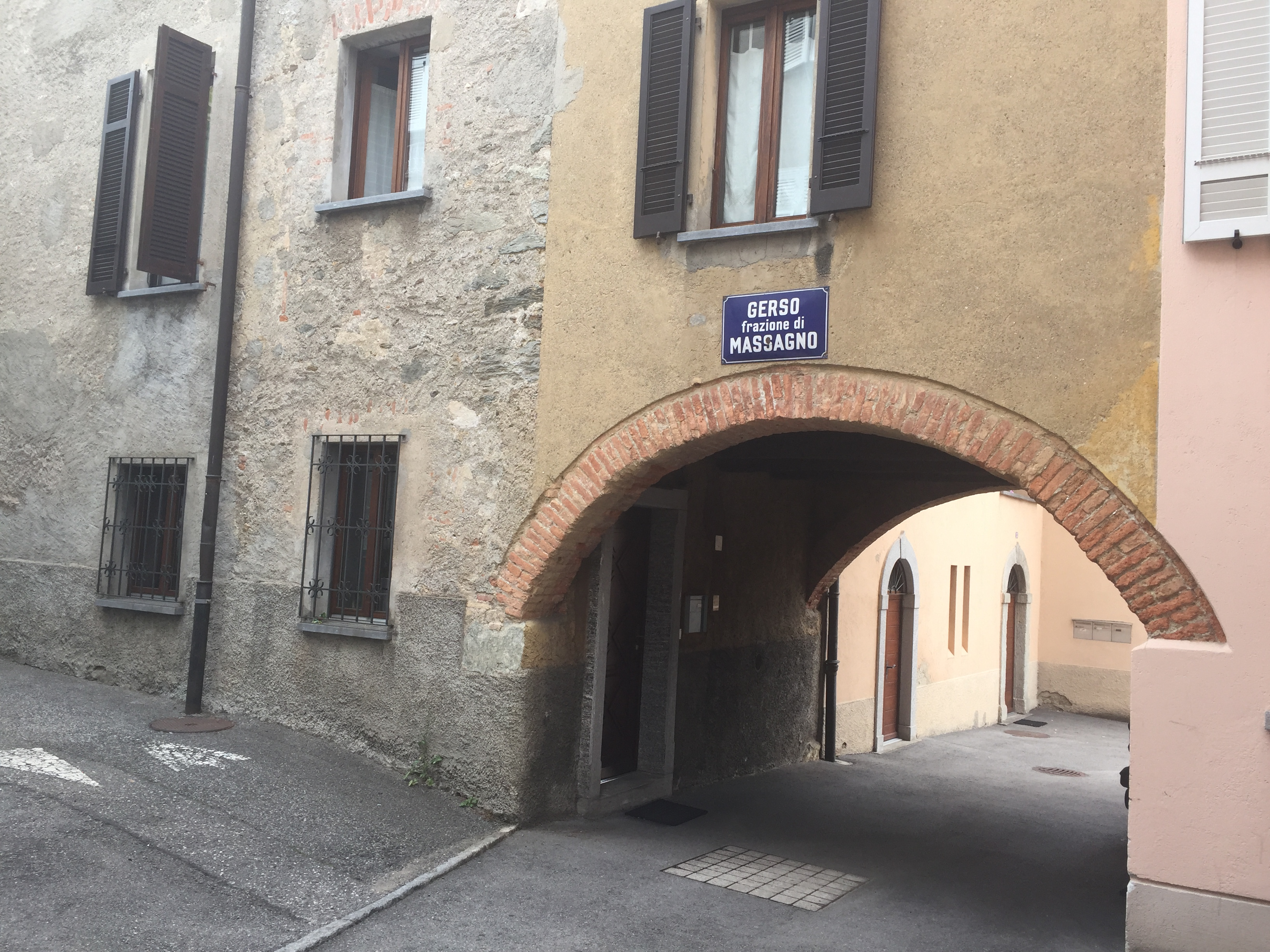
The ancient part Gerso

Historically, Massagno was part of the Lugano parish. Between 1920 and 1927, together with Rovello, it formed one of Luganos five rettorati. The Chapel of St. Anthony of Padua in Gerso is from 1655 to 1670 and was restored in 1983. It was built by a member of the Solari family from Gerso, who had made his fortune in the wool trade in Venice.

Between 1815 and 1830, the main road into the village was built. Between 1879 and 1880 an excavation for a railway line led to strong population growth as workers (especially from Italy) migrated to Massagno for work. In 2000, about three quarters commuted out of town for work. The school complex was built in 1970–71.

== Geography ==
Aerial view (1950)

Massagno has an area, as of 2009, of 0.74 square kilometers (0.29 sq mi). Of this area, 0.73 km^{2} (0.28 sq mi) or 98.6% is buildings or roads, while 0.01 km^{2} (0.0039 sq mi) or 1.4% is forested. Of the built up area, housing and buildings made up 59.4% and transportation infrastructure made up 24.3%. while parks, green belts and sports fields made up 8.1%.

The municipality is located in the Lugano District, in the north-western agglomeration of Lugano. It consists of the village of Massagno the settlement of Gerso and, since 1804, part of the former municipality of Rovello.

== Coat of arms ==
The blazon of the municipal coat of arms is Azure a chestnut three vert fructed gules a core and eradicated or issuant from a mount of the second in chief a sun in splendor and in base of the first two line invected argent. The tree refers to the location of the village, on top of a hill, surrounded by chestnut trees.

== Demographics ==
Massagno has a population (as of December 2020) of 6,272. As of 2016, 42.0% of the population are resident foreign nationals. In 2015 a large minority (1,367 or 22.0% of the population) was born in Italy. Over the last 6 years (2010–2016) the population has changed at a rate of 5.86%. The birth rate in the municipality, in 2016, was 8.7, while the death rate was 7.7 per thousand residents.

Most of the population (as of 2000) speaks Italian (78.0%), with German being second most common (6.6%) and Serbo-Croatian being third (5.4%). Of the Swiss national languages (as of 2000), 369 speak German, 127 people speak French, 4,334 people speak Italian, and 7 people speak Romansh. The remainder (721 people) speak another language.

As of 2008, the gender distribution of the population was 45.9% male and 54.1% female. The population was made up of 1,563 Swiss men (26.4% of the population), and 1,152 (19.5%) non-Swiss men. There were 2,048 Swiss women (34.6%), and 1,155 (19.5%) non-Swiss women.

In 2008 there were 31 live births to Swiss citizens and 24 births to non-Swiss citizens, and in same time span there were 40 deaths of Swiss citizens and 13 non-Swiss citizen deaths. Ignoring immigration and emigration, the population of Swiss citizens decreased by 9 while the foreign population increased by 11. There were 8 Swiss men who emigrated from Switzerland and 4 Swiss women who immigrated back to Switzerland. At the same time, there were 53 non-Swiss men and 50 non-Swiss women who immigrated from another country to Switzerland. The total Swiss population change in 2008 (from all sources, including moves across municipal borders) was an increase of 35 and the non-Swiss population change was an increase of 104 people. This represents a population growth rate of 2.4%.

As of 2016, children and teenagers (0–19 years old) make up 17.7% of the population, while adults (20–64 years old) are 60.8% of the population and seniors (over 64 years old) make up 21.5%. In 2015 there were 2,694 single residents, 2,623 people who were married or in a civil partnership, 372 widows or widowers and 520 divorced residents.

In 2016 there were 3,021 private households in Massagno with an average household size of 2.02 persons. In 2015 about 29.3% of all buildings in the municipality were single family homes, which is much less than the percentage in the canton (68.1%) and much less than the percentage nationally (57.4%). Of the 541 inhabited buildings in the municipality, in 2000, about 33.5% were single family homes and 51.6% were multiple family buildings. Additionally, about 2.6% of the buildings were built before 1919, while 3.9% were built between 1991 and 2000. In 2015 the rate of construction of new housing units per 1000 residents was 5.8. The vacancy rate for the municipality, in 2017, was 1.82%.

The historical population is given in the following chart:

== Traffic ==
Massagno is in close proximity to the SBB station Lugano on the Gotthard axis, which leads through the Gotthard Base Tunnel, opened in 2018, and thus on its main axis Zurich – Milan. Rail service of the Ceneri Base Tunnel started on 4 September 2020 and was operationalised for freight in December 2020. The tunnel improves the connection of Lugano (and therefore also of Massagno) by local trains to the cities of Bellinzona and Locarno significantly. The travel time between Locarno and Lugano is reduced by the new tunnel from 55 to 22 minutes.

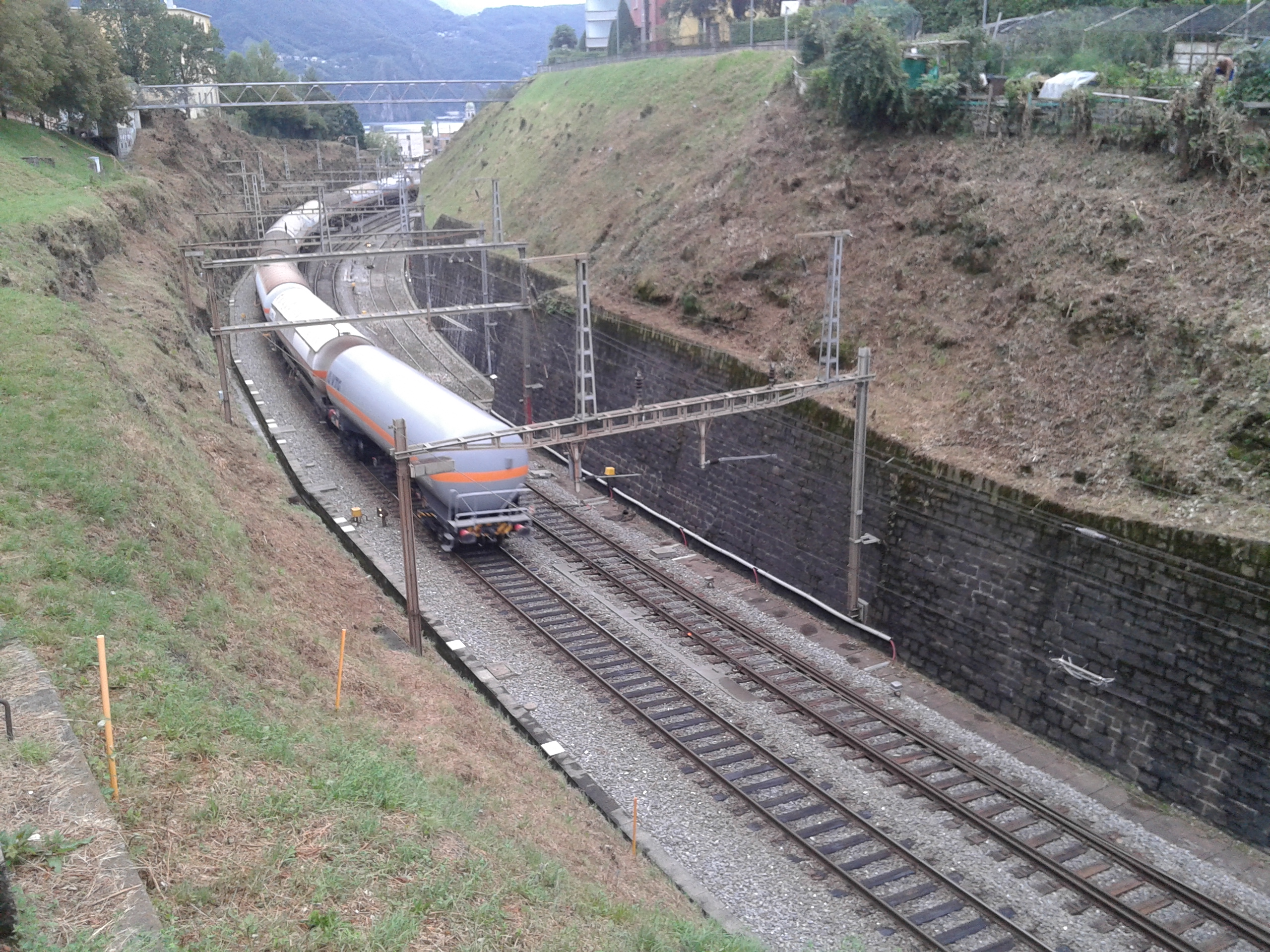
Trincea

It is planned to fill the "trincea" (ditch), where the railway tracks run before the northern entrance to Lugano station and which cuts through the territory of the municipality of Massagno, and to create a park on the resulting area.

Massagno is located directly on the slip road Lugano-South to the Swiss Highway 2 (Gotthard route) from Basel to Milan.

Traffic history: The Lugano–Tesserete railway was a narrow-gauge railway from Lugano railway station to Tesserete that started in 1907. The first stop after Lugano station was in Massagno. The railway was electrified from the outset; it was replaced by a bus line of the public transport operator Autolinee Regionali Luganesi (ARL) in 1967.

== Heritage sites ==
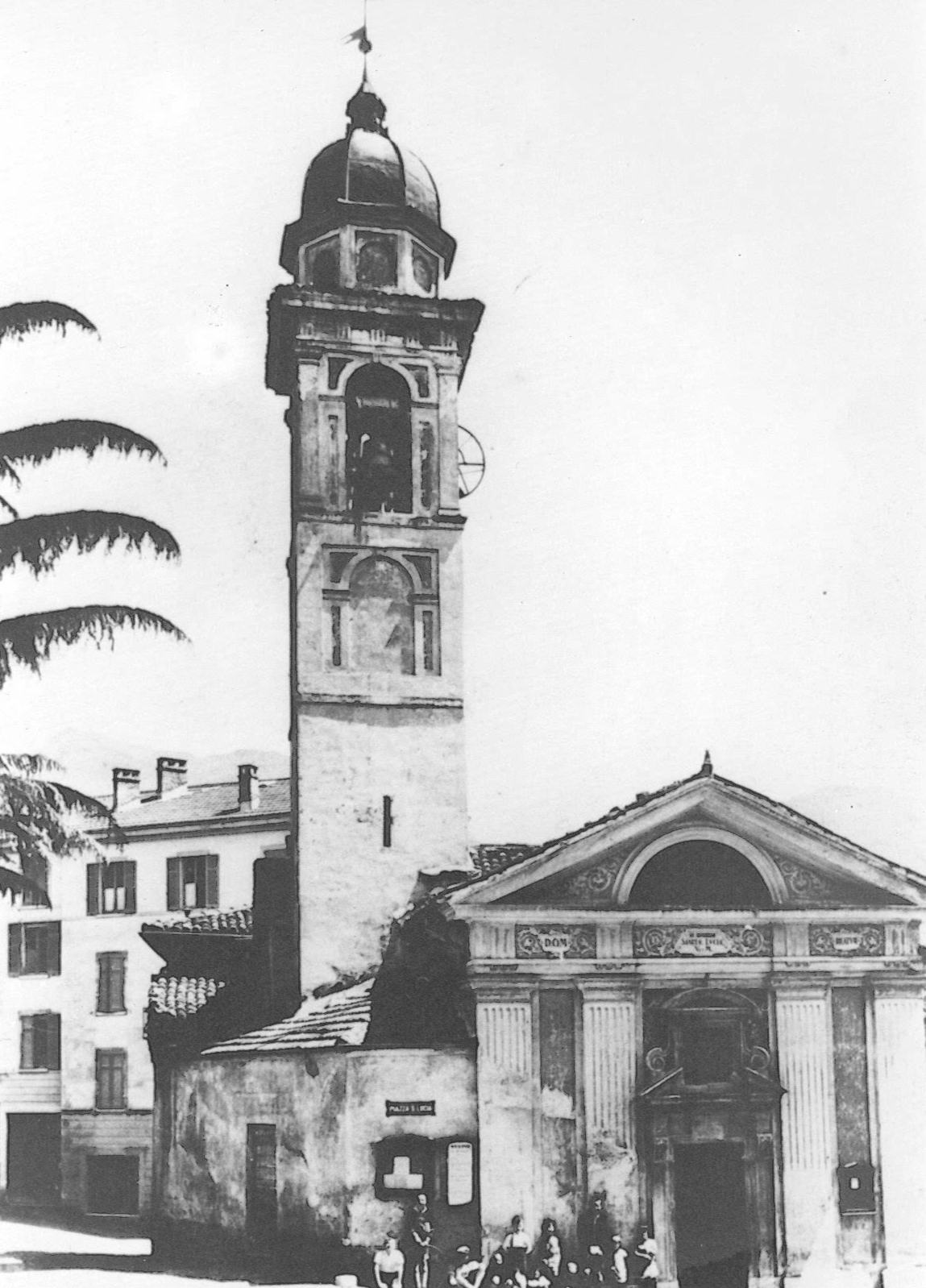
The ancient church "Santa Lucia"

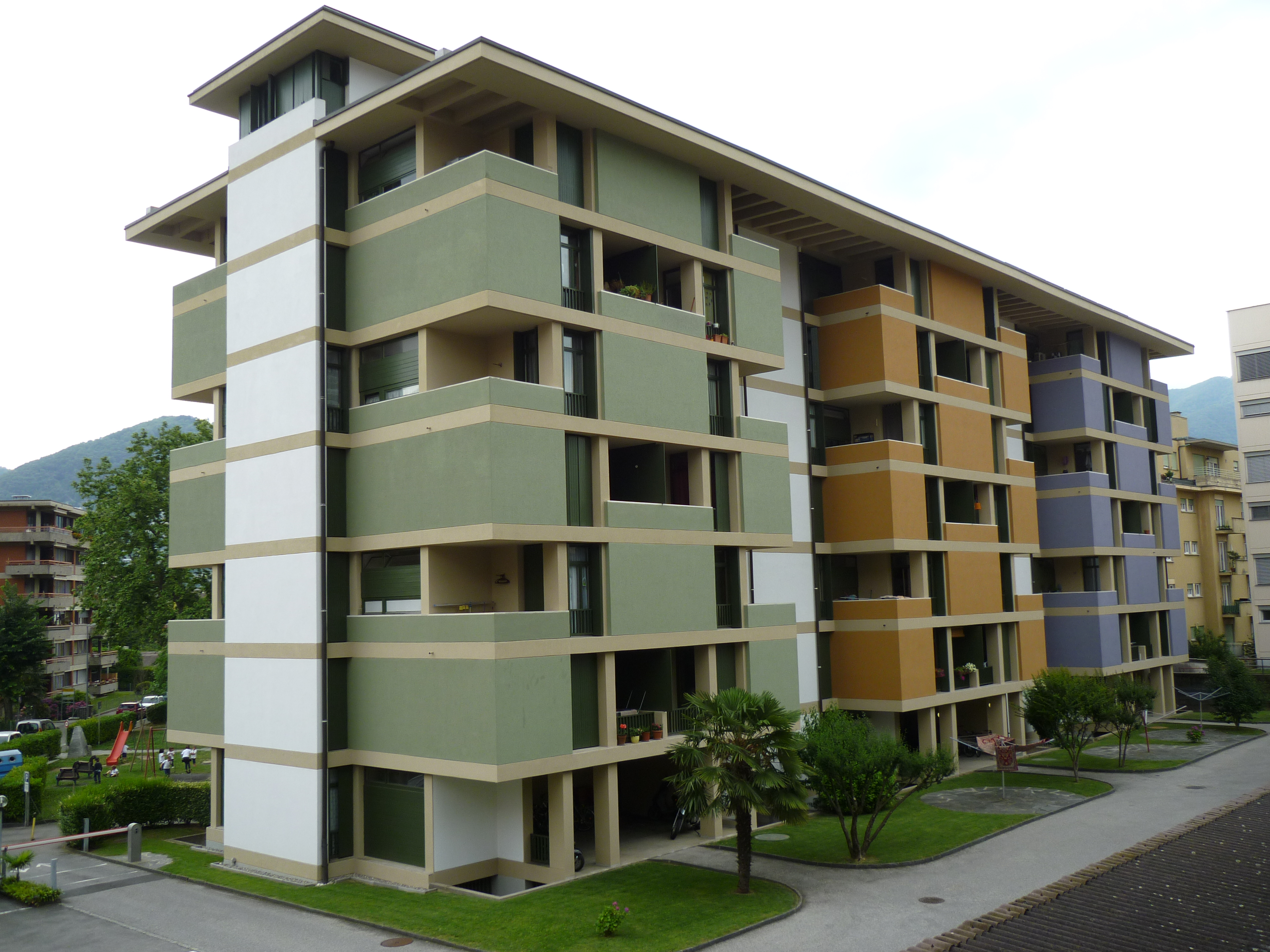
Albairone House apartments

- Parish church of Santa Lucia with Renaissance paintings; in the interior paintings Adorazione dei Magi (16th century), Annunciazione (1636), Santa Lucia (17th century) and stained glass windows by Roberto Pasotti. The paintings come from the old parish church of Santa Lucia built in 1530 and demolished in 1931 during the widening of the Via del San Gottardo.
- The D'Appartamenti Albairone House (architect: Peppo Brivio) is listed as a Swiss heritage site of national significance.

== Politics ==
In the 2015 federal election the most popular party was the CVP with 33.1% of the vote. The next three most popular parties were the SP (18.9%), the Ticino League (17.2%) and the FDP (15.2%). In the federal election, a total of 1,695 votes were cast, and the voter turnout was 53.0%.

In the 2007 federal election the most popular party was the CVP which received 39.16% of the vote. The next three most popular parties were the SP (16.45%), the FDP (15.72%) and the Ticino League (14.25%). In the federal election, a total of 1,556 votes were cast, and the voter turnout was 50.7%.

In the 2007 Gran Consiglio election, there were a total of 3,098 registered voters in Massagno, of which 1,892 or 61.1% voted. 24 blank ballots and 4 null ballots were cast, leaving 1,864 valid ballots in the election. The most popular party was the PPD+GenGiova which received 620 or 33.3% of the vote. The next three most popular parties were; the PS (with 279 or 15.0%), the LEGA (with 273 or 14.6%) and the PLRT (with 268 or 14.4%).

In the 2007 Consiglio di Stato election, 18 blank ballots and 8 null ballots were cast, leaving 1,867 valid ballots in the election. The most popular party was the PPD which received 619 or 33.2% of the vote. The next three most popular parties were the LEGA (with 384 or 20.6%), the PS (with 305 or 16.3%) and the PLRT (with 258 or 13.8%).

== Economy ==
Massagno is a suburban community. The municipality is part of the agglomeration of Lugano. As of 2014, there were a total of 1,874 people employed in the municipality. There were no primary sector jobs or businesses in the municipality. The secondary sector employed 330 workers in 42 separate businesses, with two businesses employing a total of 222 employees. Finally, the tertiary sector provided 1,544 jobs in 398 businesses.

In 2016 a total of 5.8% of the population received social assistance. In 2011 the unemployment rate in the municipality was 5.7%.

In 2015 the average cantonal, municipal and church tax rate in the municipality for a couple with two children making SFr 80,000 was 2.2% while the rate for a single person making SFr 150,000 was 14.9%. The canton has one of the lowest average tax rates for those making SFr 80,000 and an average rate for those making SFr 150,000. In 2013 the average income in the municipality per tax payer was SFr 93,916 and the per person average was SFr 39,061, which is greater than the cantonal averages of SFr 76,339 and SFr 33,527 respectively It is also greater than the national per tax payer average of SFr 82,682 and the per person average of SFr 35,825.

In 2000, there were 1,341 workers who commuted into the municipality and 2,153 workers who commuted away. The municipality is a net exporter of workers, with about 1.6 workers leaving the municipality for every one entering. About 15.7% of the workforce coming into Massagno are coming from outside Switzerland, while 0.4% of the locals commute out of Switzerland for work. Of the working population, 19.5% used public transportation to get to work, and 44% used a private car.

As of 2009, there were 3 hotels in Massagno with a total of 34 rooms and 64 beds.

== Religion ==
From the 2000 census, 3,837 or 69.0% were Roman Catholic, while 362 or 6.5% belonged to the Swiss Reformed Church. There are 1,054 individuals (or about 18.96% of the population) who belong to another church (not listed on the census), and 305 individuals (or about 5.49% of the population) did not answer the question.

== Education ==
The entire Swiss population is generally well educated. In Massagno about 63.9% of the population (between age 25–64) have completed either non-mandatory upper secondary education or additional higher education (either university or a Fachhochschule).

In Massagno there were a total of 766 students (as of 2009). The Ticino education system provides up to three years of non-mandatory kindergarten and in Massagno there were 132 children in kindergarten. The primary school program lasts for five years and includes both a standard school and a special school. In the municipality, 227 students attended the standard primary schools and 7 students attended the special school. In the lower secondary school system, students either attend a two-year middle school followed by a two-year pre-apprenticeship or they attend a four-year program to prepare for higher education. There were 191 students in the two-year middle school and 1 in their pre-apprenticeship, while 86 students were in the four-year advanced program.

The upper secondary school includes several options, but at the end of the upper secondary program, a student will be prepared to enter a trade or to continue on to a university or college. In Ticino, vocational students may either attend school while working on their internship or apprenticeship (which takes three or four years) or may attend school followed by an internship or apprenticeship (which takes one year as a full-time student or one and a half to two years as a part-time student). There were 48 vocational students who were attending school full-time and 64 who attend part-time.

The professional program lasts three years and prepares a student for a job in engineering, nursing, computer science, business, tourism and similar fields. There were 10 students in the professional program.

As of 2000, there were 178 students in Massagno who came from another municipality, while 318 residents attended schools outside the municipality.
