= Old Church of Santa Lucia, Massagno =

Church in Switzerland, demolished in 1931

Coordinates: 46.0107°N 8.9465°E

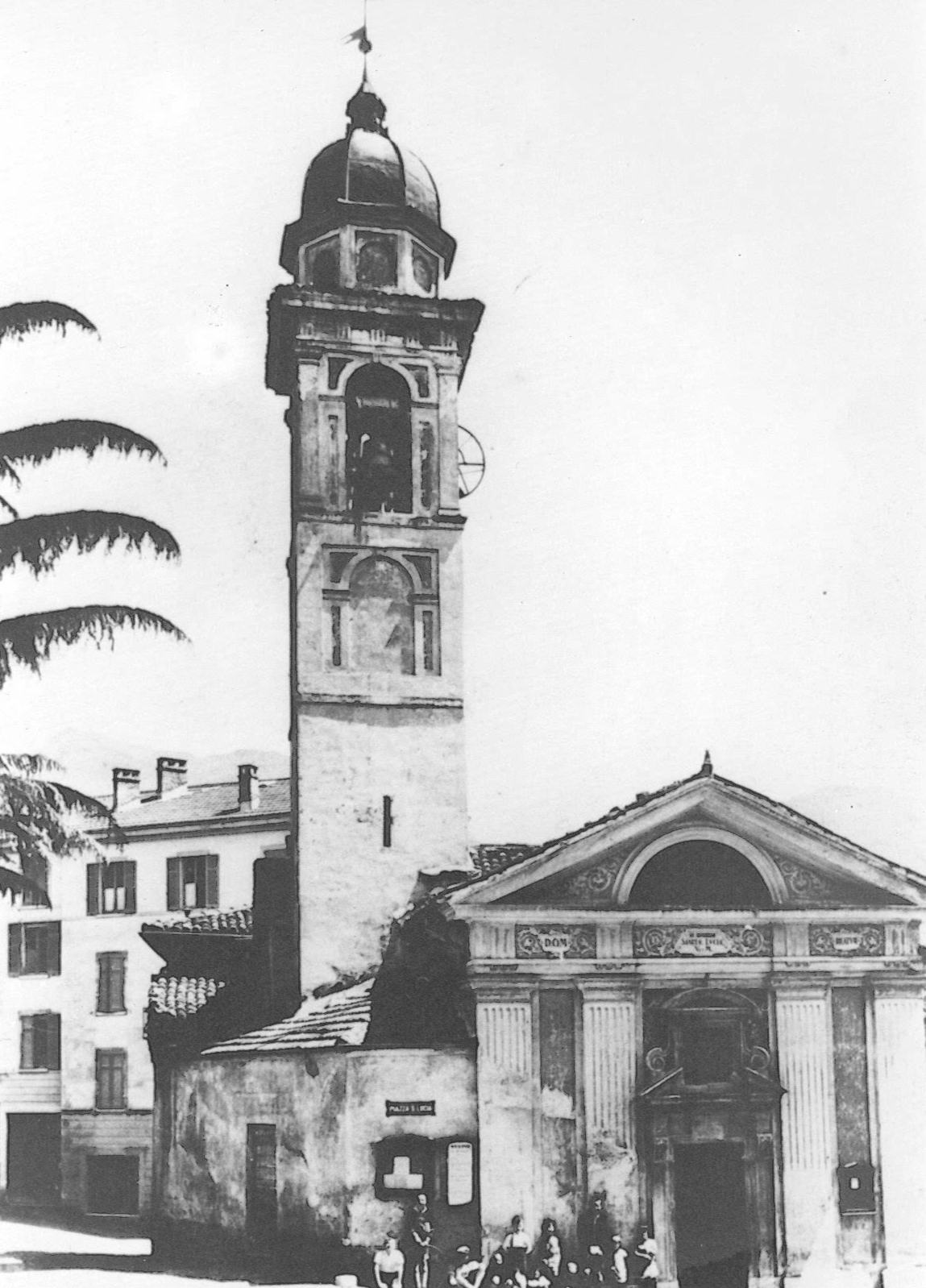
Old church of Santa Lucia in Massagno, demolished 1931

The old Church of Santa Lucia in Massagno, canton of Ticino, Switzerland, was built in the 16th century and demolished in 1931 because of the extension of the Via San Gottardo. The new parish church of Santa Lucia was built to replace it in 1931, a few hundred metres where the square of the old church had stood.

"The year of construction is not clearly indicated... An element for [its] determination...can be taken from the picture of the Adoration of the Magi...created by Bernardino Luini (or under his direction by his pupils) around the middle of the 16th century as a fresco above the altar."

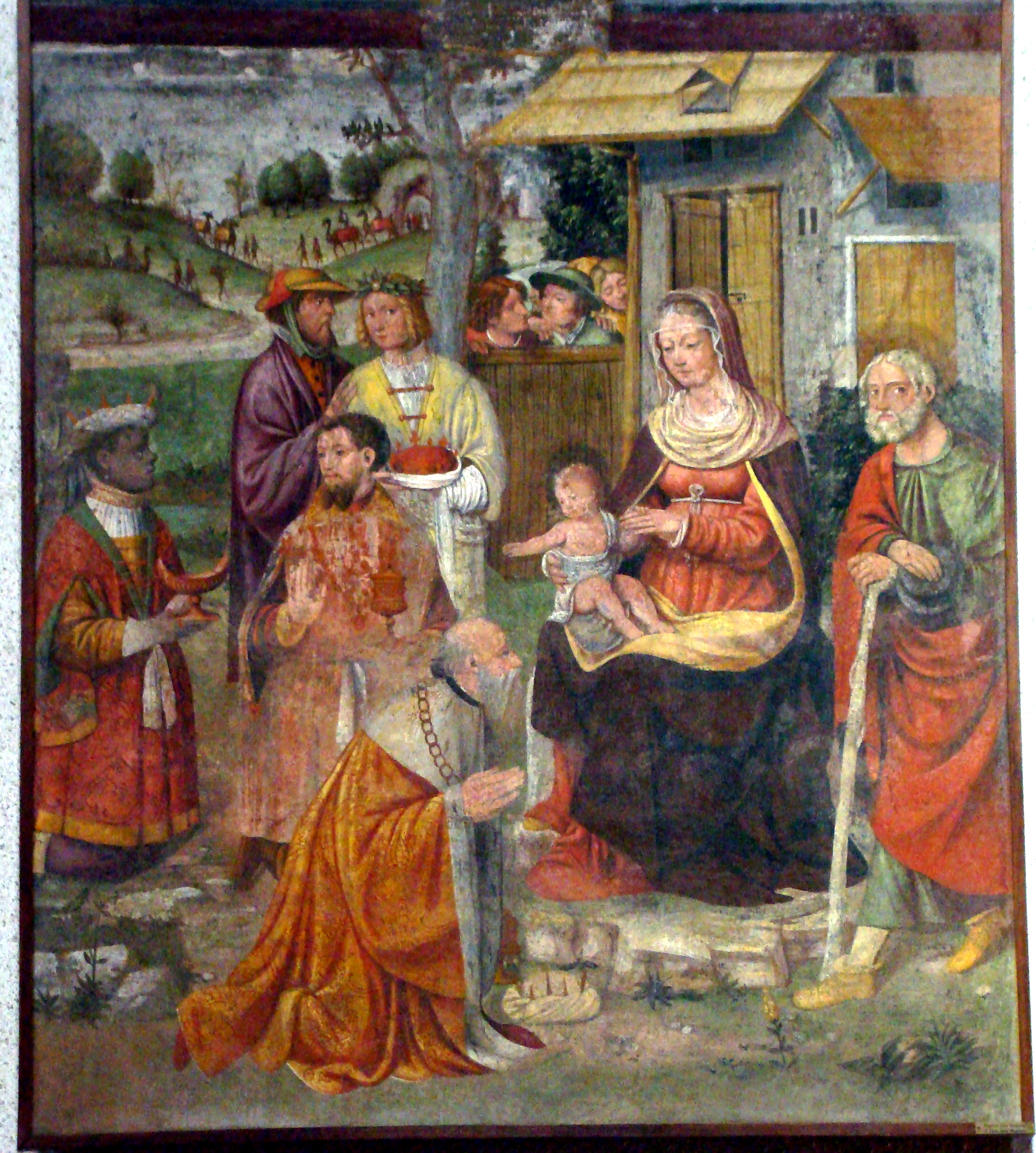
The painting of the Adoration of the Magi

The frescoes and paintings from the old church, some dating from the 16th century, are now in the new church, including the 16th-century fresco of the Adoration of the Magi, which was transferred to canvas. Also, preserved are the paintings of the Annunciation (1636) and of Santa Lucia (17th century).
