= Carlo Bossoli =

Italian painter (1815–1884)

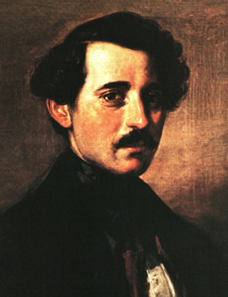
- Self-portrait
- Born: 6 December 1815; Lugano, Switzerland
- Died: 1 August 1884 (aged 68); Turin, Italy

Carlo Bossoli (6 December 1815, in Lugano – 1 August 1884, in Turin) was a Swiss-born Italian painter and lithographer, who spent his early career in Russia. He is best known for historical scenes from the Risorgimento.

== Biography ==
Bossoli was born on 6 December 1815 in Lugano, in the canton of Ticino, Switzerland, the son of Pietro Bossoli. His father was stonemason who was originally from Davesco, a town near Lugano. In 1820, Bossoli's family moved to accept work in Odessa. Until 1826, he studied with the Capuchins. After graduating, Bossoli worked in a shop that sold antiquarian books and prints. It was there that he began to draw and sketch. In 1828, he was hired by the Odessa Opera to work as an assistant to Rinaldo Nannini, a stage designer who had studied at La Scala under Alessandro Sanquirico. Bossoli began to sell his paintings in 1833. His father died three years later and he found himself the sole support of his mother, his sister and her illegitimate son.

Luckily, Bossoli's work drew the attention of Prince Mikhail Vorontsov, who commissioned him to paint several views of Odessa. Princess Elizabeta was impressed with his abilities and arranged for him to study in Italy from 1839 to 1840. He stayed mostly in Naples and Rome, giving special attention to tempera and gouache and associating with the many British artists who were living there. Bossoli returned in 1840 and settled in the coastal resort of Alupka, on the Vorontsov estate.

In 1844, at the request of his mother (who was ill), Bossoli moved to Milan and opened a studio there. In 1848, he produced popular scenes from "Five Days of Milan". His mother died the following year, but he remained there until 1853, when an unsuccessful uprising against the Austrians forced him to flee to Turin, which he used as his base of operations for travels to England, France, Spain, Morocco, Germany and Scandinavia.

During those years, Bossoli produced an album of paintings, showing views of Crimea, which was published in London by Vincent Brooks, Day & Son. It proved to be very popular due to public interest in the Crimean War. Later, in 1859, they commissioned him to produce a series of lithographs depicting the Second Italian War of Independence which were published as "The War in Italy".

After seeing them, young Prince Oddone, Duke of Montferrat gave Bossoli a commission to follow the Piedmontese Army and make a record of its campaigns. The result was an album of 150 tempera paintings and the Prince declared him to be "the painter of our history". He fell ill with a fever at this time and his productivity declined dramatically. Bossoli divided his time between decorating his home to resemble the Vorontsov Palace and doting on his nephew.

In 1883, at the age of sixty-eight, Bossoli married Adelaide De Carolis, who was only twenty-one. The marriage was generally believed to be a financial arrangement. The following year, he died of a heart attack. He was buried in Lugano and a street in Turin is named after him.

== Selected paintings ==
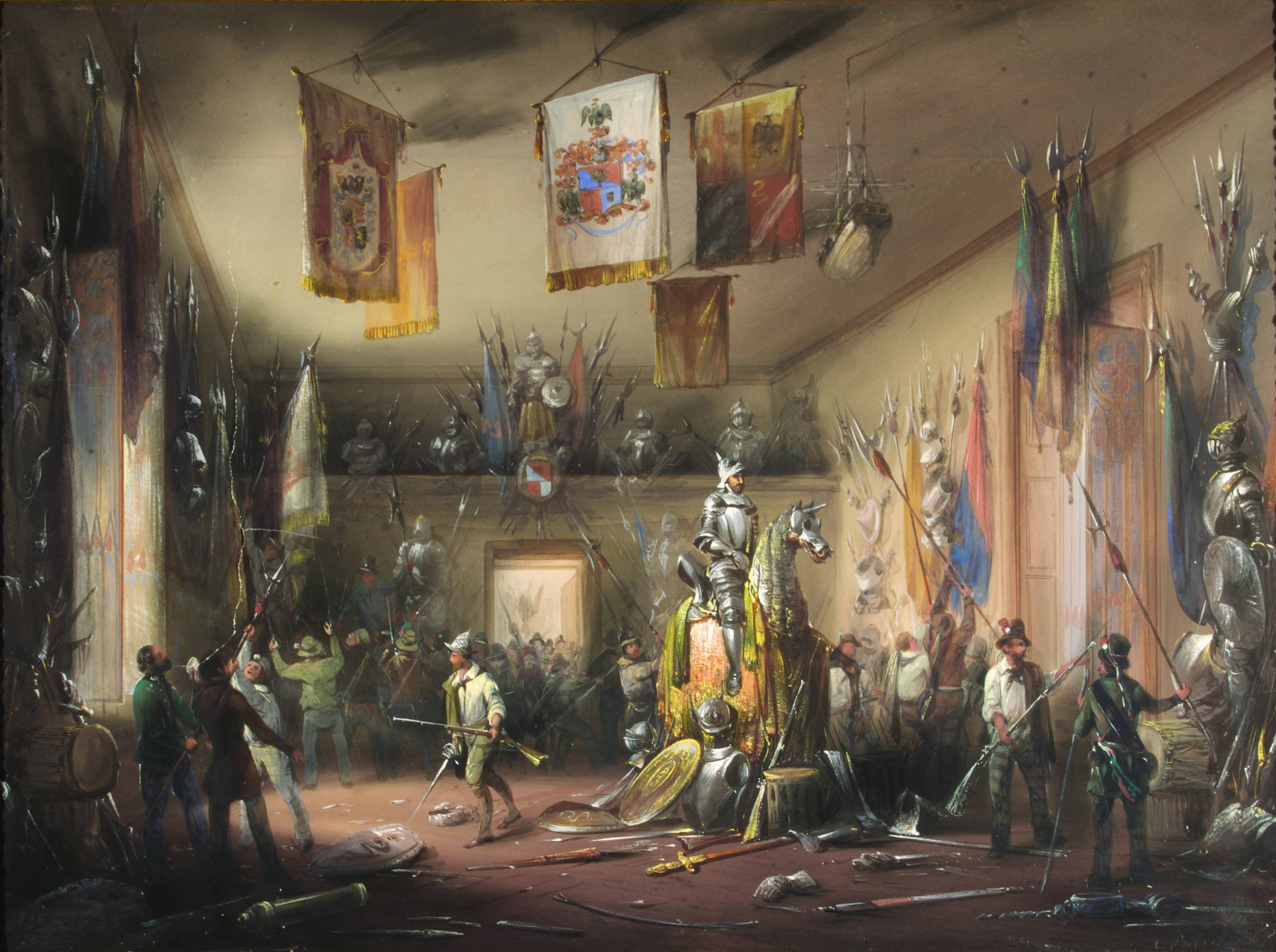
The Armory of the Ubaldo family; raided by revolutionaries. (1848)

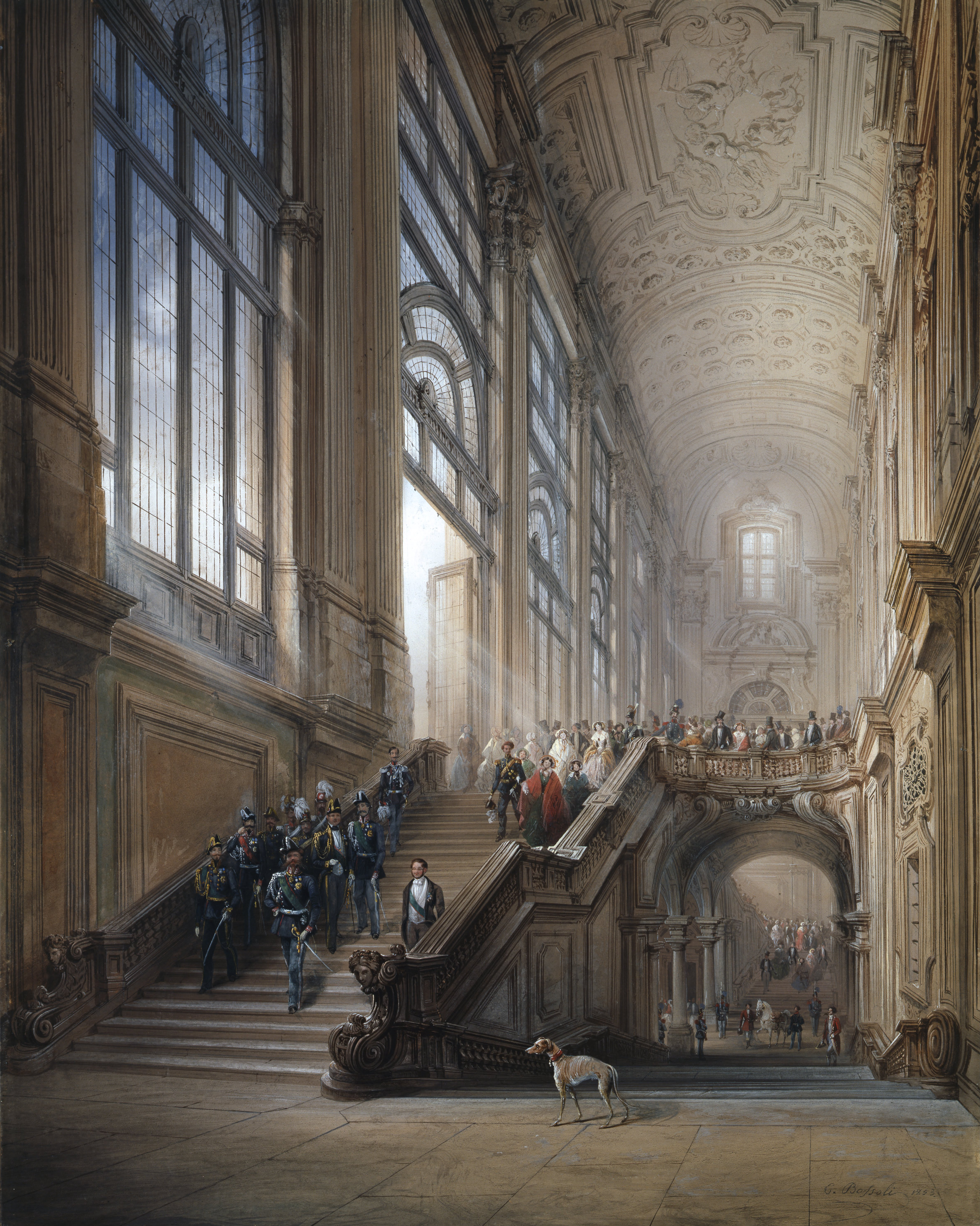
King Victor Emanuel II and Camillo Cavour at the opening of the "Senato Subalpino" (1853)

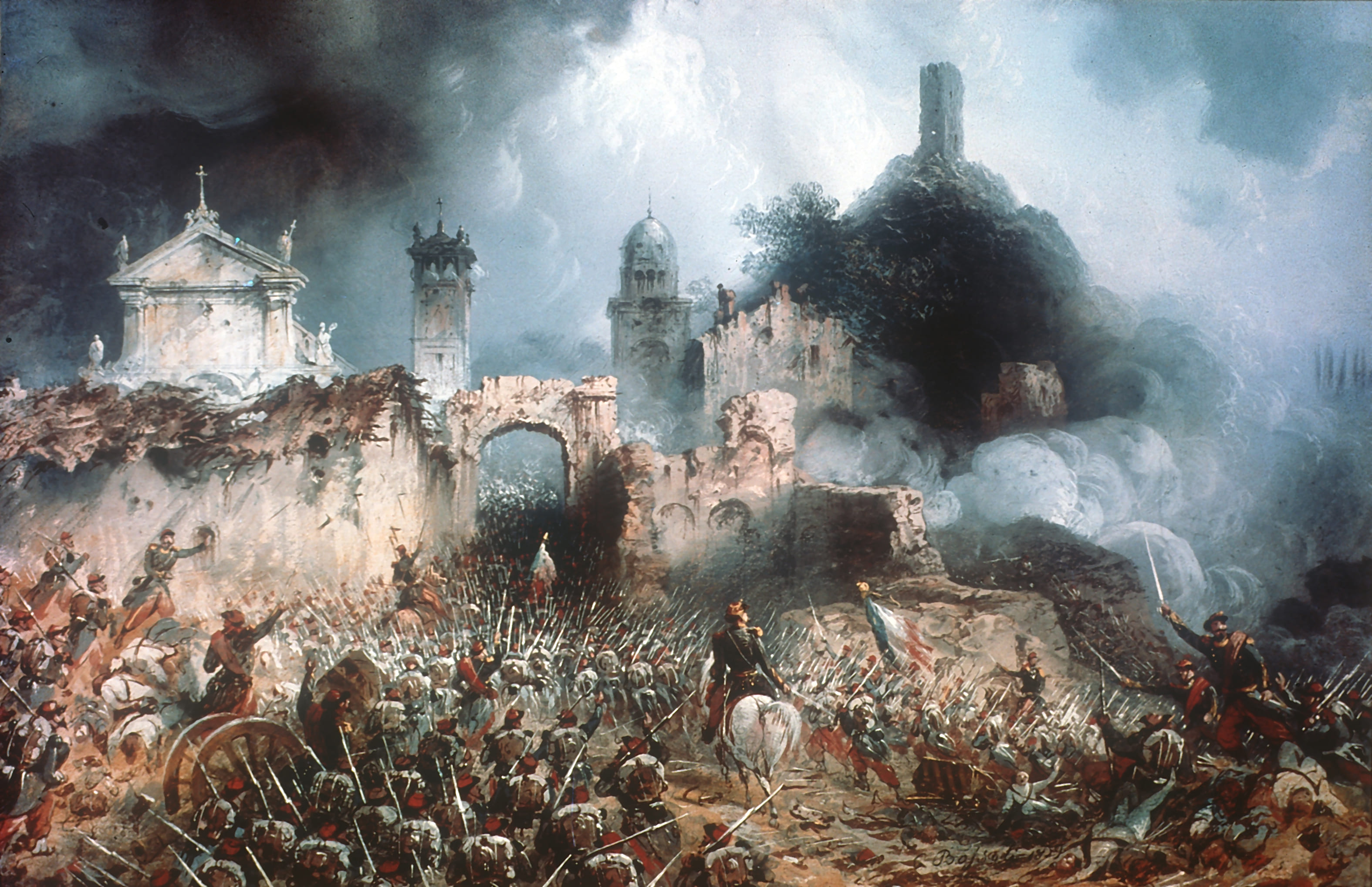
The Battle of Solferino (1859)

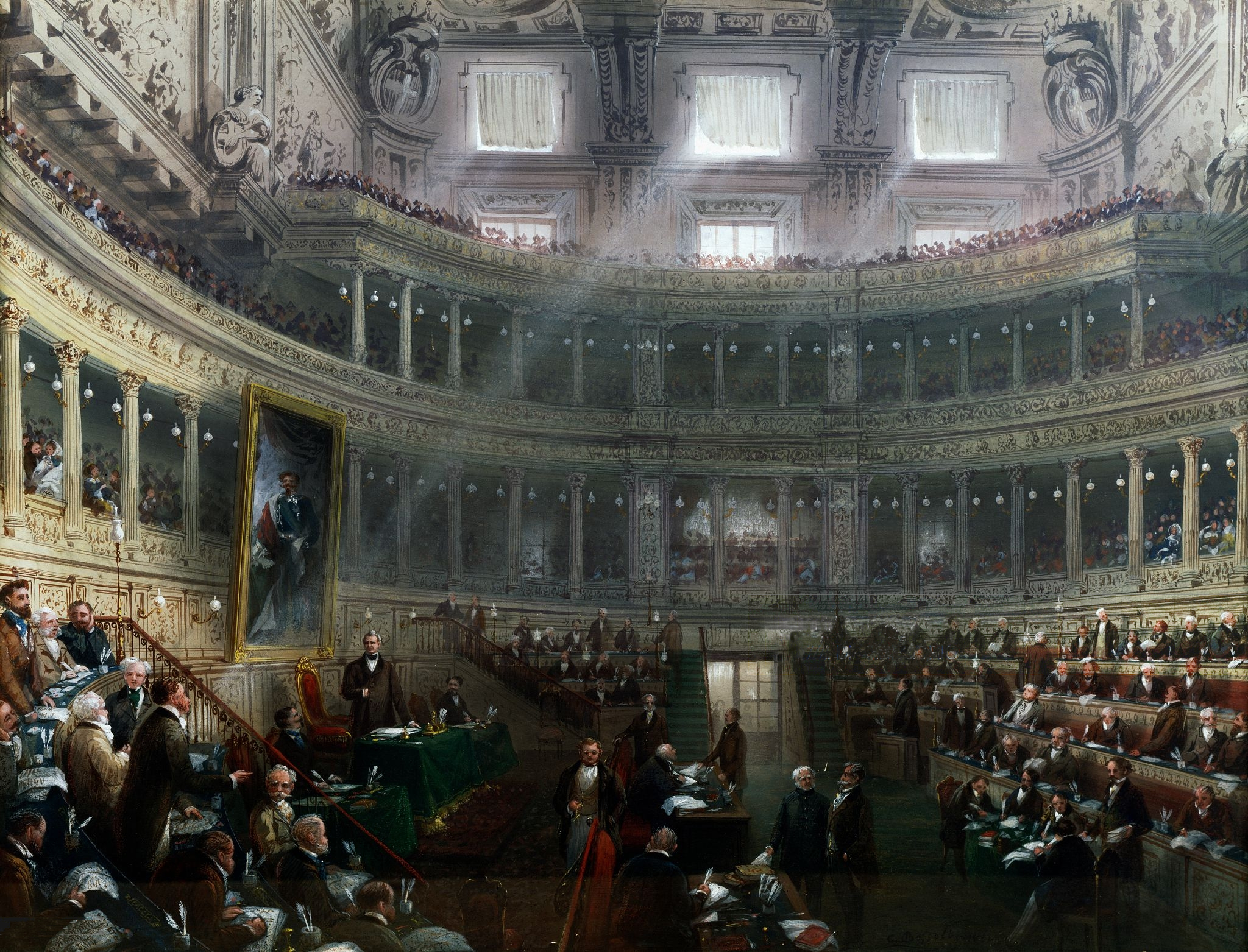
The Senate of the Kingdom of Sardinia in the Palazzo Madama, presided over
by Cesare Alfieri di Sostegno (1860)

== See also ==
- List of Orientalist artists
- Orientalism
