= Davesco-Soragno =

Coordinates: 46°2′12″N 8°58′48″E

- Quarter
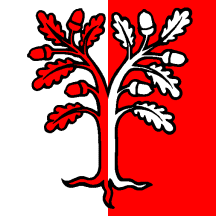
- Flag Coat of arms

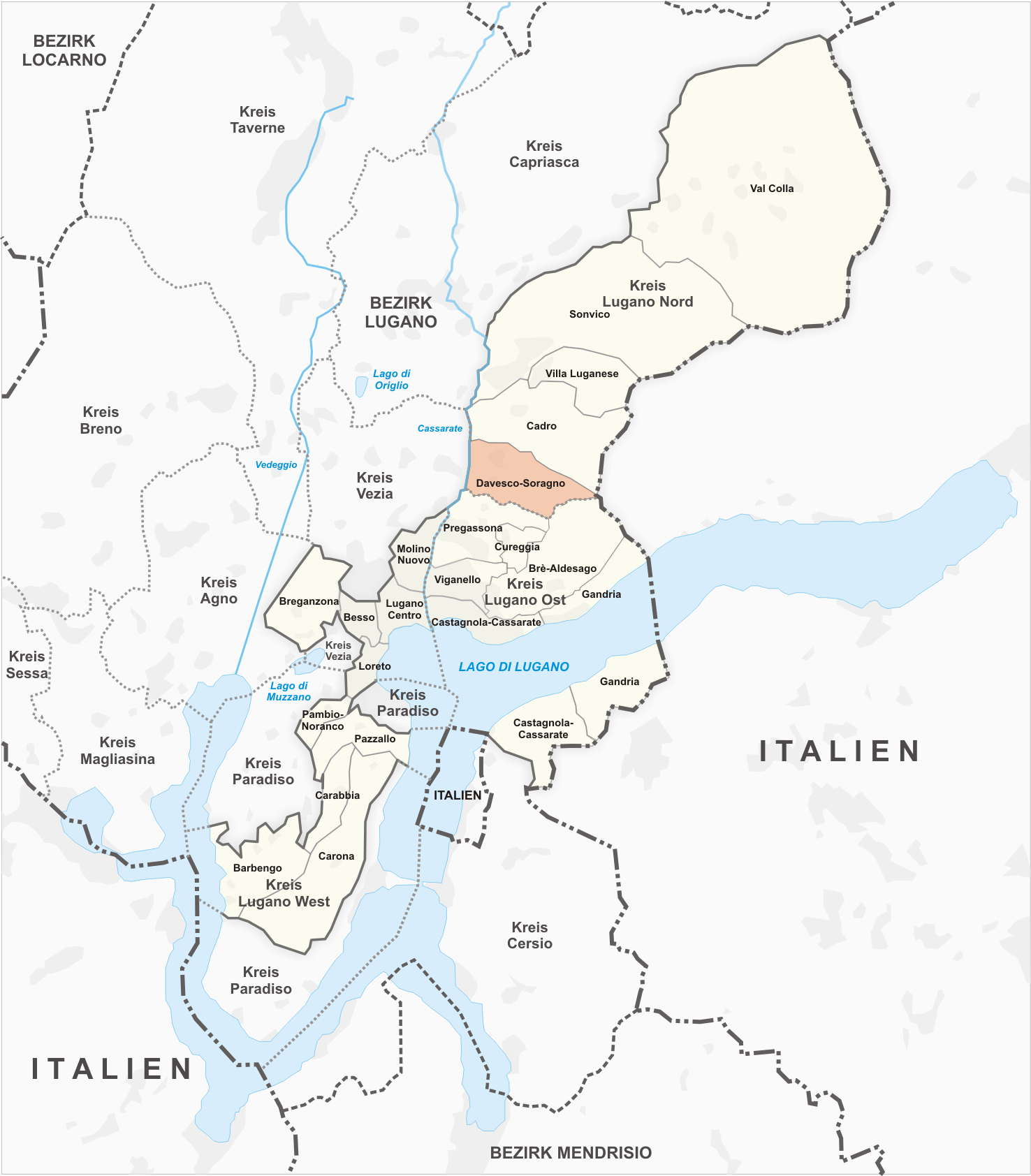
- Country: Switzerland
- Canton: Ticino
- District: Lugano
- City: Lugano

Area
  - Total: 2.5 km^{2} (0.97 sq mi)

Population (2012-12-31)
  - Total: 1,691
  - Density: 680/km^{2} (1,800/sq mi)

Davesco-Soragno is a quarter of the city of Lugano, Switzerland. Davesco-Soragno was formerly a municipality of its own, having been incorporated into Lugano in 2004.

Aerial view (1948)

The municipality contained the villages Davesco and Soragno. It had 194 inhabitants in 1801, which increased to 299 in 1850, 356 in 1900, 456 in 1950, 707 in 1980 and 1288 in 2000.
