= Jeux sans frontières season 26 =

Jeux sans frontières
- Season 26
- No. of teams: 7 countries
- Winner: (Czech Republic) Brno
- Runner-up: (Hungary) Eger
- Head referee: Denis Pettiaux
- No. of episodes: 11

Release
- Original release: June 1995 – September 1995

Season chronology
- ← Previous; Season 25 Next → Season 27

The 26th season of the international television game show Jeux sans frontières was held in the summer of 1995. Broadcasters from the Czech Republic, Greece, Hungary, Italy, Malta, Portugal, and Switzerland participated in the competition coordinated by the European Broadcasting Union (EBU). The different heats were hosted by some of the participant broadcasters in locations in their countries such as Milan (Italy), Brno (Czech Republic), Vilamoura (Portugal), Athens (Greece), Budapest (Hungary), and San Ġiljan (Malta). The grand final was held in Budapest (Hungary). The head international referee in charge of supervising the competition was Denis Pettiaux.

The season was won by the team from Brno, Czech Republic, being the runner-up the team from Eger, Hungary.

== Participants ==
Country	Broadcasters	Code	Colour
Czech Republic	ČT	CZ	Orange
Greece	ERT	GR	Dark Blue
Hungary	MTV	H	Yellow
Italy	RAI	I	Light blue
Malta	PBS	M	White
Portugal	RTP	P	Green
Switzerland	SRG SSR	CH	Red

== Heats ==
=== Heat 1 ===
Heat 1 was hosted by RAI in Milan, Italy.

Place	Country	Town	Points
1	CH	Vallemaggia	68
2	CZ	Veselí nad Moravou	61
3	H	Szeged	60
4	I	Milano	52
5	P	Vila Franca de Xira	49
6	GR	Mykonos	47
7	M	Ħaż-Żebbuġ	38

=== Heat 2 ===
Heat 2 was hosted by ČT in Brno, Czech Republic.

Place	Country	Town	Points
1	CZ	Brno	76
2	I	Latina	62
3	P	Paços de Ferreira	55
4	CH	Biasca	51
5	GR	Batsi	46
5	M	Saint Lawrence	46
7	H	Satoraljaujhely	37

=== Heat 3 ===
Heat 3 was hosted by RAI in Milan, Italy.

Place	Country	Town	Points
1	GR	Rhodos	62
1	H	Eger	62
3	CZ	Děčín	59
4	CH	San Gottardo	58
4	I	Brunico	58
6	P	Serpa	42
7	M	Attard	36

=== Heat 4 ===
Heat 4 was hosted by RTP in Vilamoura, Portugal.

Place	Country	Town	Points
1	P	Faro	74
2	H	Tiszaújváros	65
3	CZ	Frýdlant	54
4	GR	Kos	51
5	M	Rabat	46
6	CH	Gambarogno	42
7	I	Vibo Valentia	36

=== Heat 5 ===
Heat 5 was hosted by RAI in Milan, Italy.

Place	Country	Town	Points
1	CZ	Hradec Králové	66
2	CH	Ascona	60
3	M	Fgura	55
3	P	Viana do Castelo	55
5	H	Pápa	52
6	I	Arona	50
7	GR	Amfilochia	29

=== Heat 6 ===
Heat 6 was hosted by ERT in Athens, Greece.

Place	Country	Town	Points
1	I	Lanusei Ogliastra	70
2	P	Amadora	60
3	CZ	Turnov	55
3	H	Hódmezővásárhely	55
5	CH	Lugano	54
6	GR	Athens	44
7	M	Ħal Tarxien	43

=== Heat 7 ===
Heat 7 was hosted by MTV in Budapest, Hungary.

Place	Country	Town	Points
1	H	Budapest	62
2	I	Mondragone	61
3	CZ	Litvínov	56
4	P	Aveiro	53
5	CH	Malcantone	50
6	M	Siġġiewi	49
7	GR	Hydra	33

=== Heat 8 ===
Heat 8 was hosted by PBS in San Ġiljan, Malta.

Place	Country	Town	Points
1	GR	Patras	59
2	P	Águeda	57
3	CH	Balerna	54
3	H	Gödöllő	54
5	M	San Ġiljan	53
6	I	Pietra Ligure	51
7	CZ	Plzeň	41

=== Heat 9 ===
Heat 9 was hosted by RTP in Vilamoura, Portugal.

Place	Country	Town	Points
1	CZ	Domažlice	63
2	CH	Capriasca	62
2	H	Százhalombatta	62
4	P	Loulé	60
5	I	Sorrento	48
6	GR	Thessaloniki	46
7	M	Qormi	28

=== Heat 10 ===
Heat 10 was hosted by ERT in Athens, Greece.

Place	Country	Town	Points
1	P	Felgueiras	75
2	CH	Alta Mesolcina	63
3	GR	Athens - Plaka	58
4	M	San Ġwann	47
5	H	Budapest	44
6	I	Villasimius	43
7	CZ	Znojmo	36

=== Qualifiers ===
The teams which qualified from each country to the final were:

Country	Town	Place won	Points won
CH	Vallemaggia	1	68
CZ	Brno	1	76
GR	Rhodos	1	62
H	Eger	1	62
I	Lanusei Ogliastra	1	70
M	Fgura	3	55
P	Felgueiras	1	75

== Final ==
The final round was held by MTV in Budapest, Hungary.

Place	Country	Town	Points
1	CZ	Brno	72
2	H	Eger	63
3	CH	Vallemaggia	58
4	P	Felgueiras	52
5	GR	Rhodos	42
6	M	Fgura	40
7	I	Lanusei Ogliastra	39
