= Soragno =

Coordinates: 46°1′53″N 8°58′44″E

- Village
- Interactive map of Soragno
- Country: Switzerland
- Canton: Ticino
- District: Lugano
- City: Lugano
- Quarter: Davesco-Soragno

Soragno is a village in the district of Lugano in the canton of Ticino, Switzerland.

It was first recorded in 1335 as Soragnio.

The village, together with Davesco, constituted the former municipality Davesco-Soragno. In 2004, Davesco-Soragno municipality was incorporated into the larger, neighboring municipality Lugano and now forms a quarter of that city.
