= Lugano–Cadro–Dino railway =

Railway line in Ticino, Switzerland

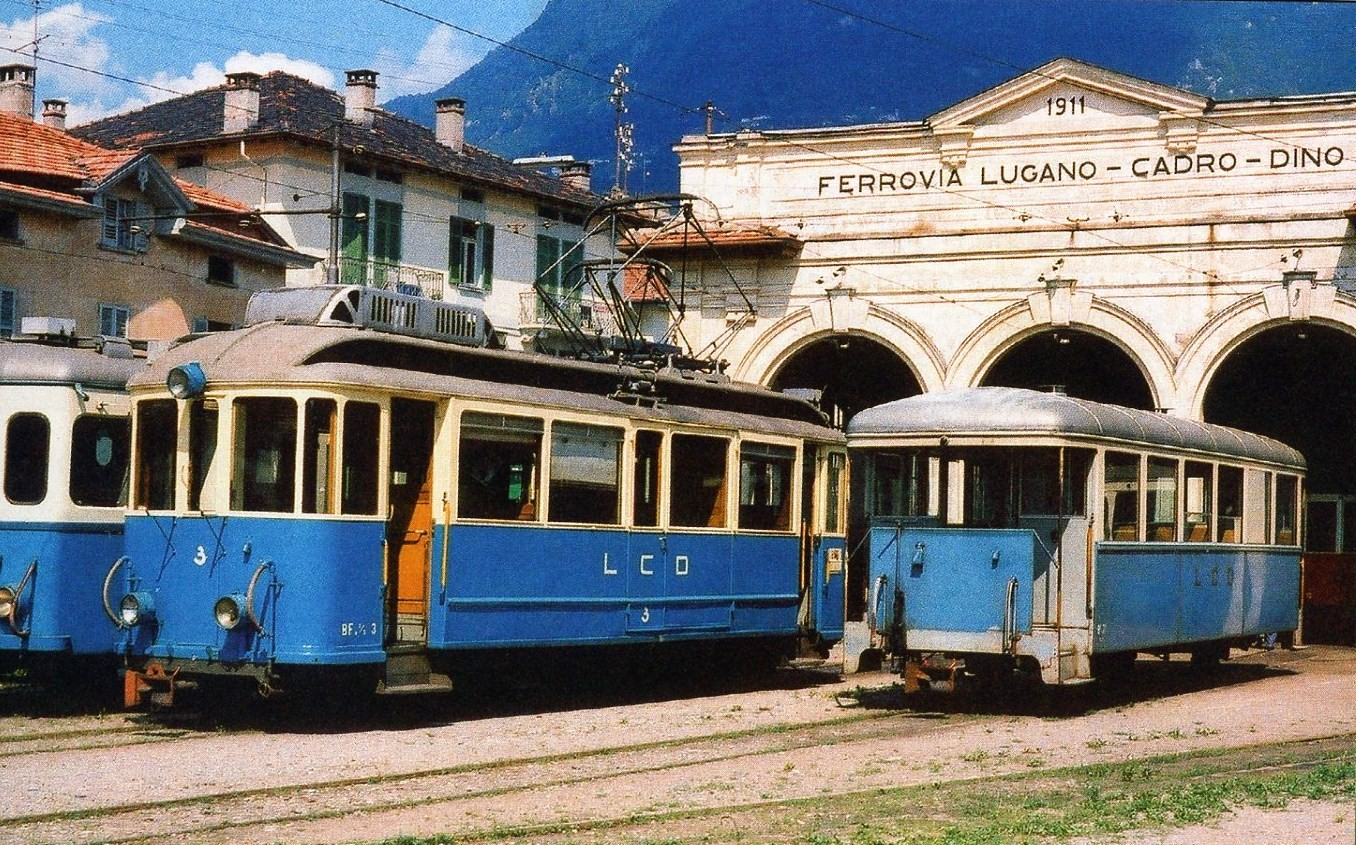
- Cars of the Lugano–Cadro–Dino railway outside the depot

Overview
- Status: Closed and removed
- Locale: Canton of Ticino
- Termini: Lugano; Dino
- Stations: 16

History
- Opened: 1911
- Closed: 1970

Technical
- Line length: 7.8 kilometres (4.8 mi)
- Track gauge: 1,000 mm (3 ft 3 3/8 in)
- Minimum radius: 40 metres (130 ft)
- Electrification: 1000 V, DC, overhead
- Maximum incline: 4%

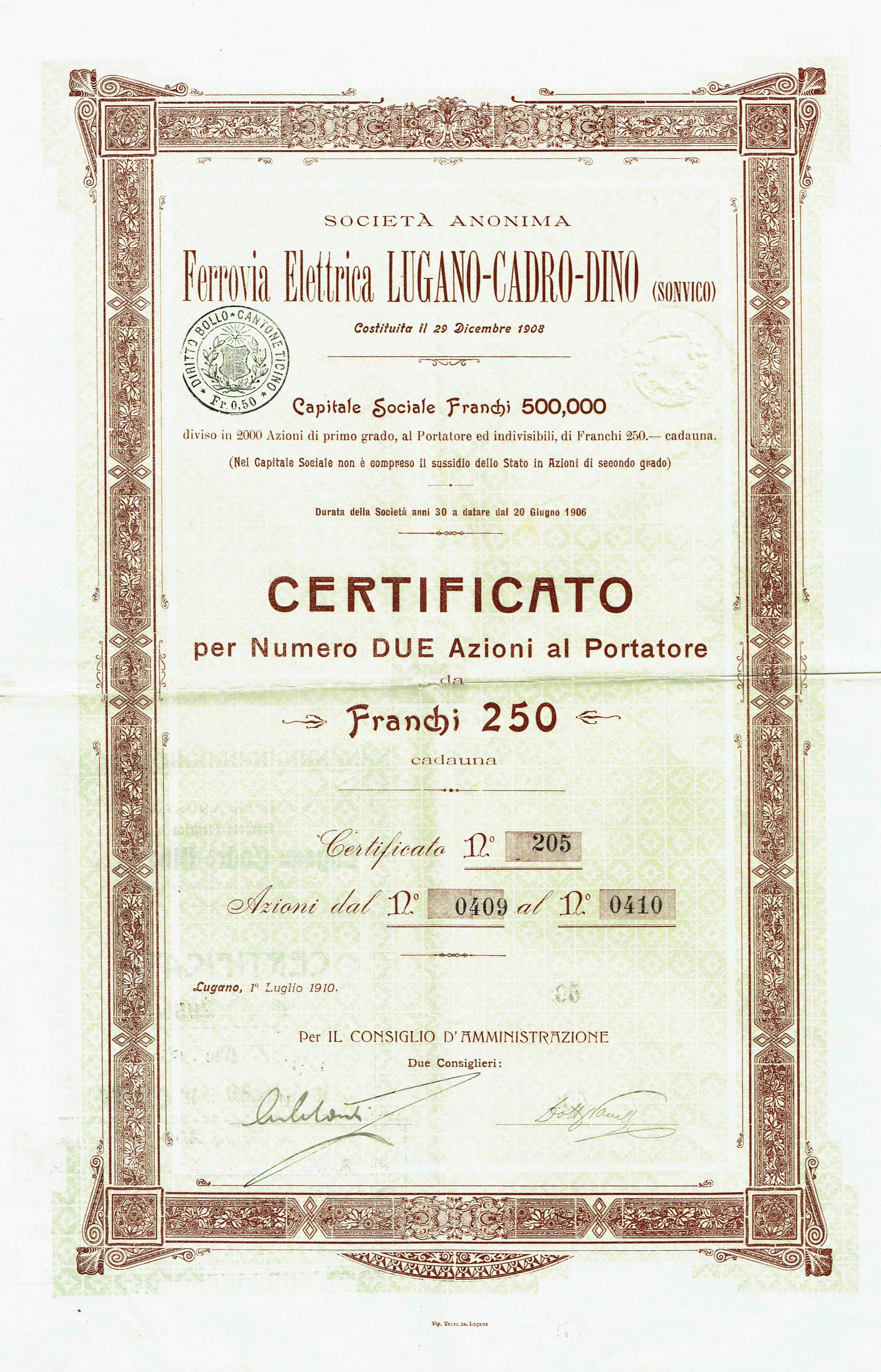
Share of the Ferrovia Elettrica Lugano-Cadro-Dino, issued 1. July 1910

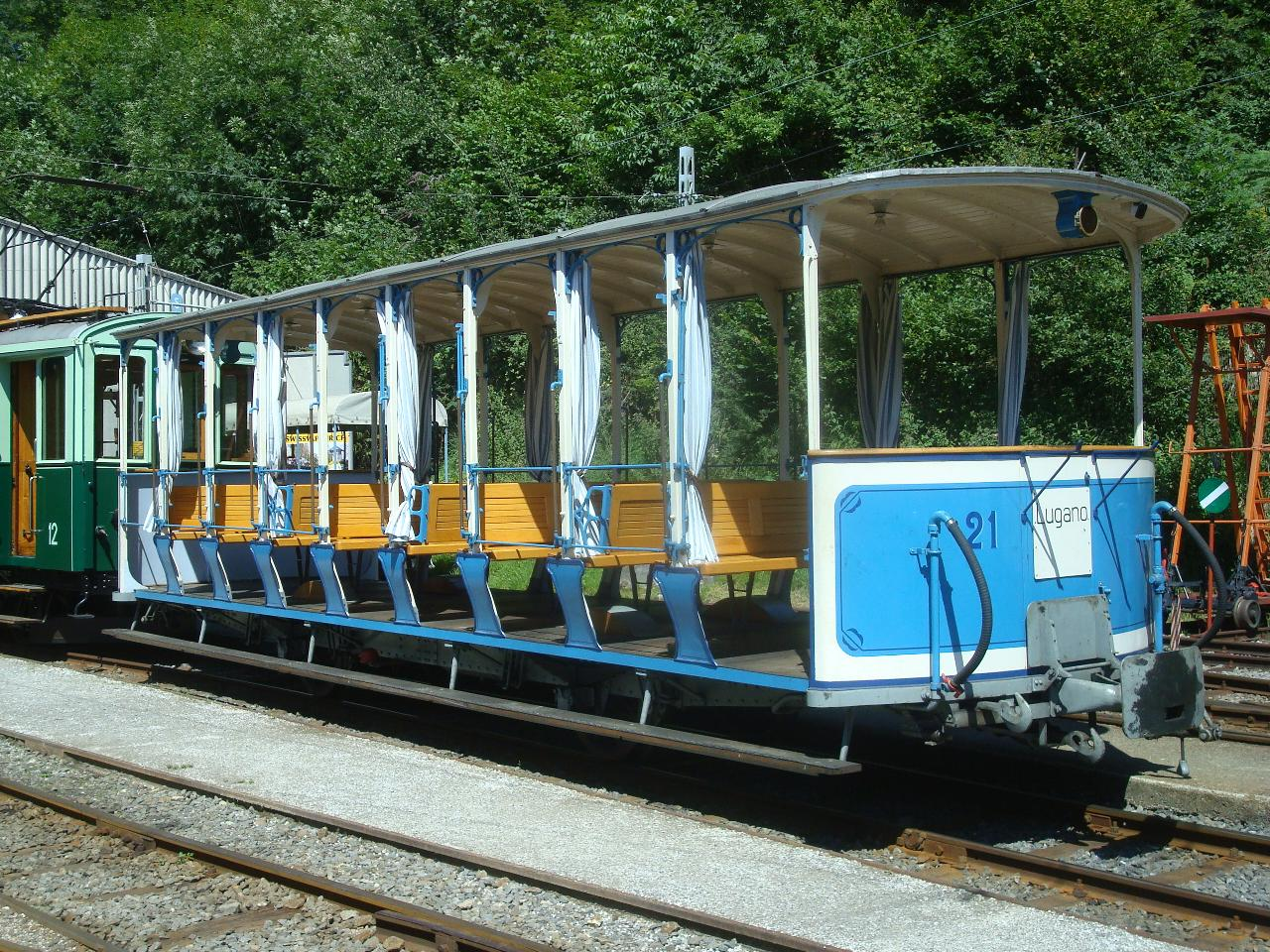
LCD car 21, as preserved at Blonay-Chamby

The Lugano–Cadro–Dino railway (Italian: Ferrovia Lugano–Cadro–Dino; LCD) was a Swiss metre gauge suburban railway that linked the towns of Lugano, Cadro and Dino, in the canton of Ticino.

The line was opened in 1911. It was 7.8 kilometres (4.8 mi) long, and was electrified at 1000 V DC using overhead lines. It commenced from a terminus in Piazza Manzoni on the Lake Lugano waterfront, had 16 stops, a maximum gradient of 4% and a minimum radius of 40 metres (130 ft). The first 2 kilometres (1.2 mi), as far as the line's depot at Lugano La Santa, was laid in the street, but from there to Dino the line occupied its own right of way.

In addition to the suburban railway service, the LCD also operated an urban tramway service over its tracks between Piazza Manzoni and La Santa. This tram service was independent of the urban tram system operated by the Azienda Comunale del Traffico (ACT), although the two systems' tracks did cross each other near Piazza Manzoni. In 1950, three tram cars of the Mendrisio tramway were acquired by the LCD, and used on the tram service, with cars running every 15 minutes. This service lasted until 1964, when it was replaced by an ACT bus service. However suburban trains, from Piazza Manzoni to Dino, continued to use the street track.

The line was cut back from Piazza Manzoni to Piazza Indipendenza in 1967, and then finally closed in 1970. The trains were replaced by a regional bus service, which subsequently merged with that of the Lugano–Tesserete railway, and today operates as the Autolinee Regionali Luganesi.

Little remains of the street track between Piazza Manzoni and La Santa, but the depot at the latter location is still in use by the ARL as a bus garage. From here it is possible to trace the line, which was on its own right of way, and included tunnels and bridges, as far as Dino. The station building at Dino has been restored and now houses a grocery store.

An original open-sided trailer car of the LCD has been restored and is preserved on the Blonay–Chamby Museum Railway. One of the cars acquired from the Mendrisio tramway has since been restored to its original state and is now on display at the Hotel Coronado in Mendrisio.

== See also ==
- Trams in Lugano
