= Villa Luganese =

- Quarter
- Flag Coat of arms

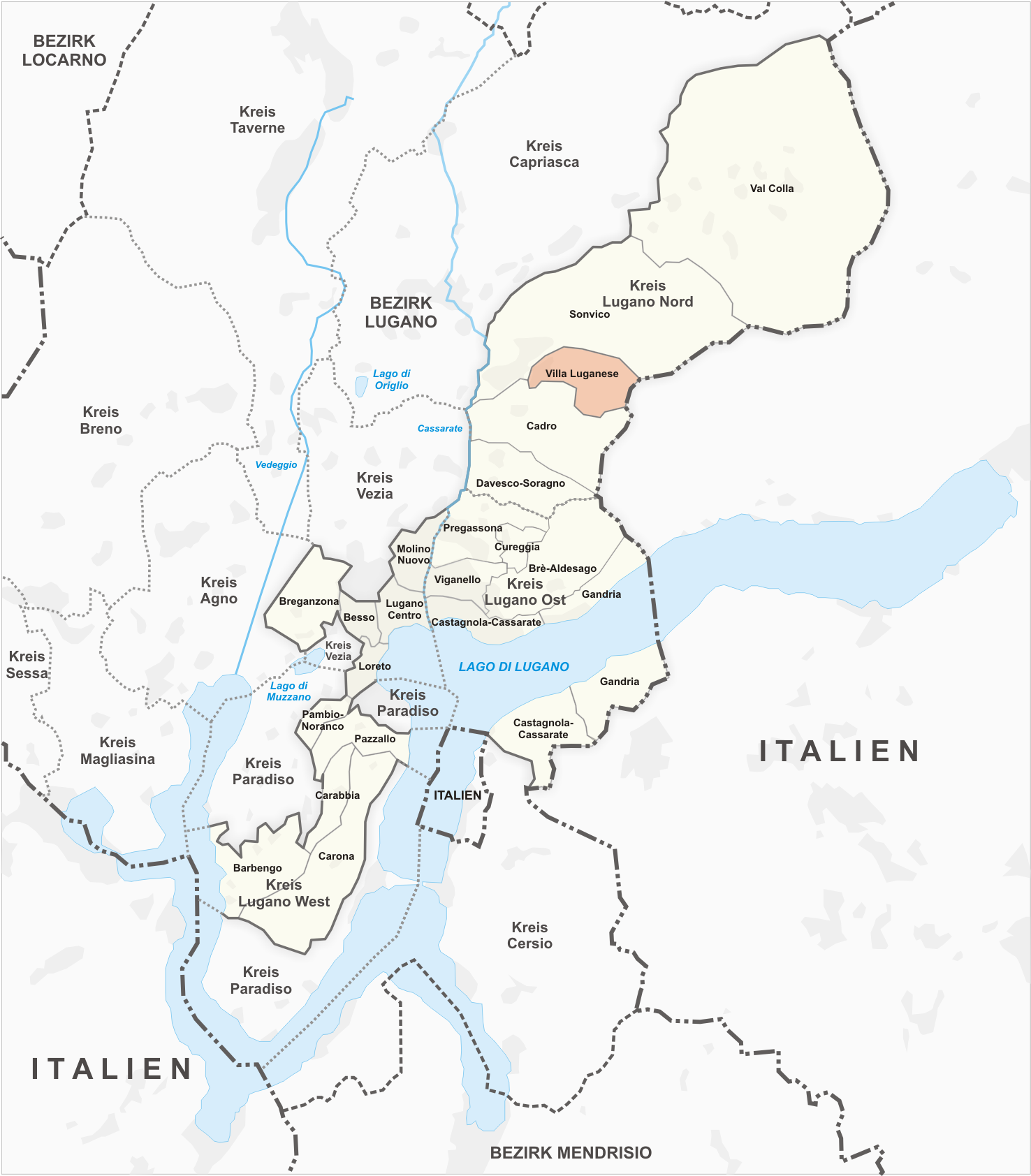
- Country: Switzerland
- Canton: Ticino
- District: Lugano
- City: Lugano

Area
  - Total: 2.21 km^{2} (0.85 sq mi)

Population (2012-12-31)
  - Total: 581
  - Density: 263/km^{2} (681/sq mi)

Villa Luganese is a quarter of the city of Lugano, Switzerland.

Aerial view (1948)

Villa Luganese was formerly a municipality of its own, having been incorporated into Lugano in 2008.
