= Davesco =

Coordinates: 46°2′12″N 8°58′48″E

- Village
- Interactive map of Davesco
- Country: Switzerland
- Canton: Ticino
- District: Lugano
- City: Lugano
- Quarter: Davesco-Soragno

Davesco is a village in the district of Lugano in the canton of Ticino, Switzerland.

It was first recorded in 1110 as Avesco.

The village, together with Soragno, constituted the former municipality Davesco-Soragno. In 2004, Davesco-Soragno municipality was incorporated into the larger, neighboring municipality Lugano and now forms a quarter of that city.
