= Lugano–Tesserete railway =

Railway line in Ticino, Switzerland

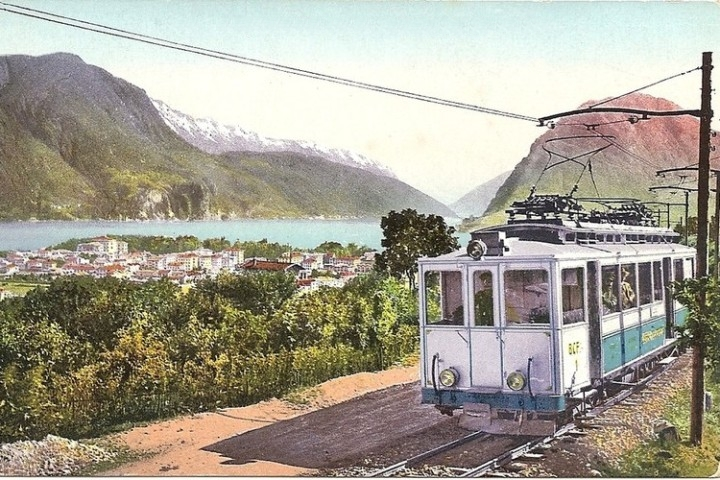
- Motorcar of the Lugano–Tesserete line c.1910

Overview
- Status: Closed and removed
- Locale: Canton of Ticino
- Termini: Lugano; Tesserete
- Stations: 10

History
- Opened: 1909
- Closed: 1967

Technical
- Line length: 7.8 kilometres (4.8 mi)
- Track gauge: 1,000 mm (3 ft 3 3/8 in)
- Minimum radius: 50 metres (160 ft)
- Electrification: 1000 V, DC, overhead
- Maximum incline: 6%

The Lugano–Tesserete railway (Italian: Ferrovia Lugano-Tesserete; LT) was a Swiss metre gauge railway that linked the towns of Lugano and Tesserete, in the canton of Ticino.

The line was 7.8 kilometres (4.8 mi) long, and was electrified at 1000 V DC using overhead lines. It commenced from a terminus adjacent to Lugano station, had 10 stops, a maximum gradient of 6% and a minimum radius of 50 metres (160 ft). At Lugano station, a link track connected to the adjacent Lugano–Ponte Tresa railway, allowing transfer of rolling stock.

The line was opened in 1909 and closed in 1967. It was replaced by a bus service, which subsequently merged with that of the Lugano–Cadro–Dino railway, and today operates as the Autolinee Regionali Luganesi (ARL).

The first 1 kilometre (0.62 mi) of the line was in the street, but much of the rest of the line was on its own right of way, with tunnels, bridges and viaducts. Many of these still exist, and it is possible to trace the route of the line. The station at Tesserete still exists, and is used as a depot by the ARL. The station at Lugano has been demolished, and the site is now occupied by a bus stop and turning circle.
