= Pregassona =

- Quarter
- Flag Coat of arms

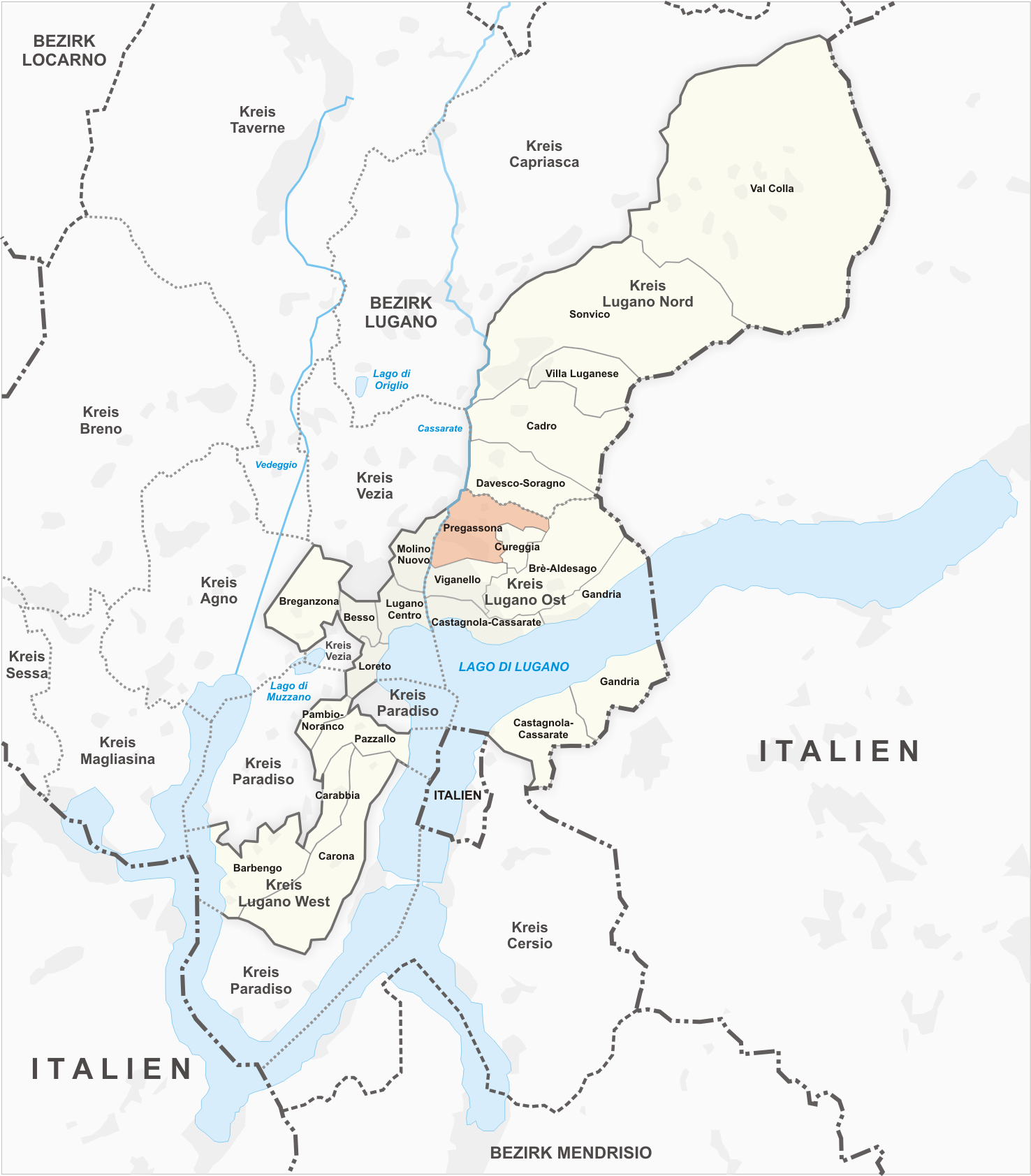
- Coordinates: 46°01′20″N 8°58′35″E
- Country: Switzerland
- Canton: Ticino
- District: Lugano
- City: Lugano

Area
  - Total: 2.56 km^{2} (0.99 sq mi)

Population (2014-12-31)
  - Total: 9,601
  - Density: 3,750/km^{2} (9,710/sq mi)
- Time zone: UTC+1

Pregassona is a quarter of the city of Lugano, Switzerland. Pregassona was formerly a municipality of its own, having been incorporated into Lugano in 2004.

The name Pregassona comes from a contraction of the local dialect for "near the Cassone"; the Cassone is a small river that flows through the village.

== Monuments and places of interest ==
- Church of Saint Mary, documented since 1222
- Oratory of Saints Peter & Paul, 14th century
- Church of Saint John the Baptist and Maximilian Kolbe, 1995
