= Trams in Lugano =

Lugano tramway network (1896-1964)

Lugano tramway network

Operation
- Locale: Lugano
- Open: 1896
- Close: 1959 / 1964
- Status: closed
- Routes: 5 (4 municipal; 1 independent)

Infrastructure
- Track gauge: 1,000 mm (3 ft 3 3/8 in) metre gauge
- Propulsion system: electric
- Electrification: 400 V three-phase AC (to 1910); 1000 V DC (after 1910)

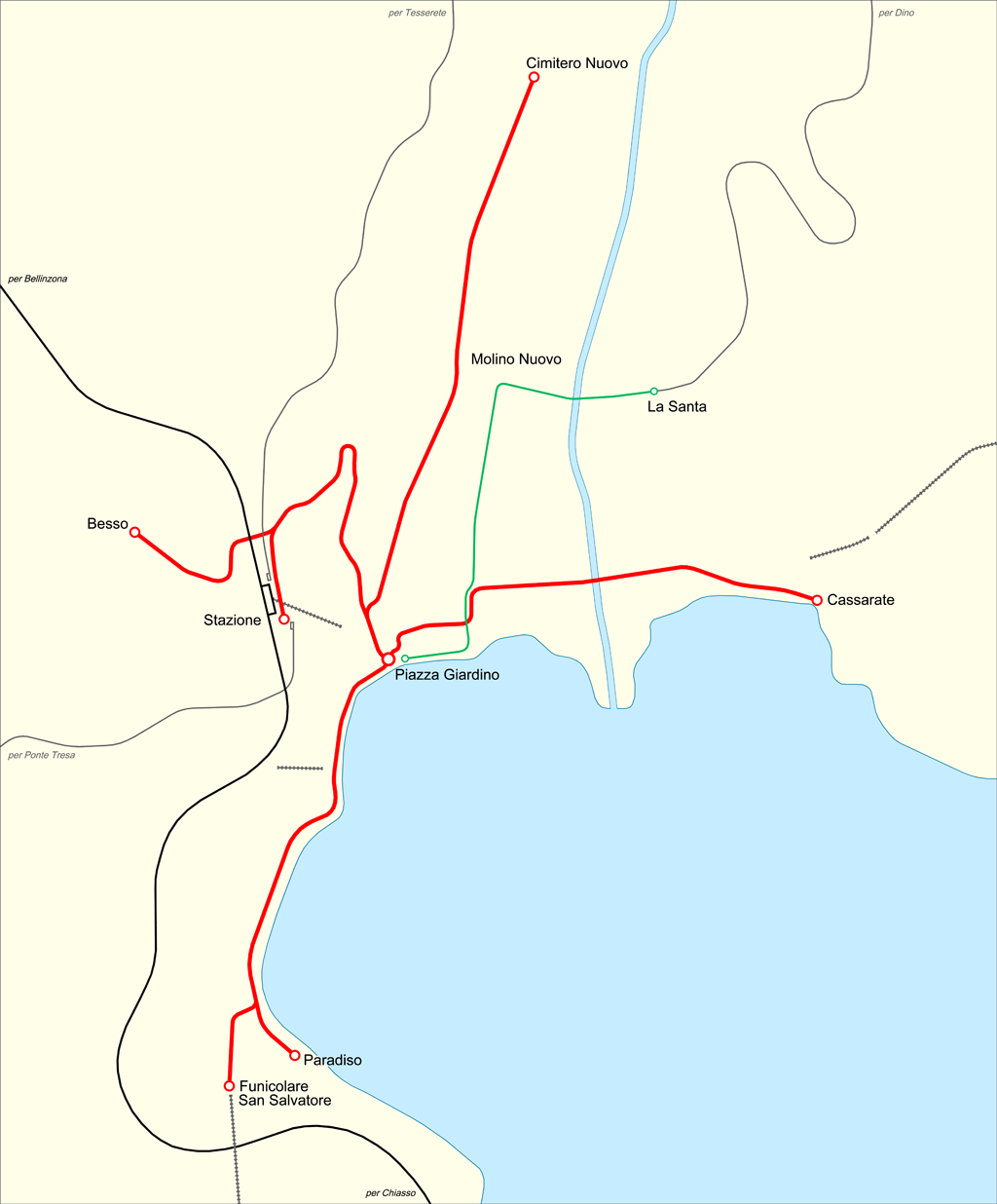
Map of Lugano's trams at maximum extent. Municipal lines in red; LCD line in green.

The Lugano tramway network (Italian: Rete tranviaria di Lugano) was part of the public transport network of Lugano, in the canton of Ticino, Switzerland, for over half a century. Opened in 1896, the network was progressively replaced by the Lugano trolleybus system by 1959, with one independent line surviving until 1964.

The main part of the network was operated by the Società luganese dei tramway elettrici, which, after several subsequent name changes, is now known as the Trasporti Pubblici Luganesi. However one route was independently operated as part of the Lugano–Cadro–Dino regional railway. Since a plebiscite in 2014, the reintroducing of a tram line is in the planning stages.

== History ==
Lugano railway station first opened in 1874, and by 1882, Lugano was connected to the north over the Monte Ceneri Pass to Bellinzona, and the Gotthard Rail Tunnel beyond that. The first local transport need in the city was to link the station with the city, which was well above the city in its lakeside location. To that end, the Lugano Città–Stazione funicular was opened in 1886.

However further economic development, not least because of the coming of the railway, led to Lugano spreading beyond its original lakeside core, resulting in further need for local transportation. The Società luganese dei tramway elettrici (Lugano Electric Tramway Company) was responsible for constructing the city's urban tramways, which went into service in 1896.

Initially the trams were supplied with electricity at 400 V three-phase AC. In 1910 the system switched to 1000 V DC.

In 1911, the Lugano–Cadro–Dino railway (LCD) opened its regional railway from Piazza Manzoni, on the Lake Lugano waterfront. The first 2 kilometres (1.2 mi) of the line, as far as the line's depot at Lugano La Santa, was laid in the street. In addition to its regional trains, the LCD operated an urban tramway service over these tracks, with tram cars running every 15 minutes. This tram service was independent of the earlier system, although the two systems' tracks did cross each other, and used the same gauge and electrification system.

The Società luganese dei tramway elettrici was taken over by the city of Lugano in 1918 and the name changed to Tranvie elettriche comunali (Municipal Electric Tramways). At its peak, in 1927, the following municipal routes were operated:

1	Piazza Giardino – Paradiso / Funicolare San Salvatore
2	Piazza Giardino – Cassarate
3	Piazza Giardino – Molino Nuovo – Cimitero
4	Piazza Giardino – Stazione – Besso

By the 1950s the decision had been taken to replace the municipal trams with trolleybuses. The first trolleybus route opened in 1954, and in the same year the Tranvie elettriche comunali changed its name to the Azienda Comunale del Traffico. The trolleybus system progressively replaced the municipal tramway network, until the last lines were operated in 1959.

The independent LCD tram line continued until 1964, when it was replaced by a municipal bus service. The LCD's regional trains continued to use the track until the line was curtailed to Piazza Indipendenza in 1967, and abandoned altogether in 1970.

== See also ==
- List of town tramway systems in Switzerland
