= List of town tramway systems in Switzerland =

This is a list of town tramway systems in Switzerland. It includes all tram systems, past and present. Cities with currently operating systems, and those systems themselves, are indicated in bold and blue background colored rows. Those tram systems that operated on other than standard gauge track (where known) are indicated in the 'Notes' column.

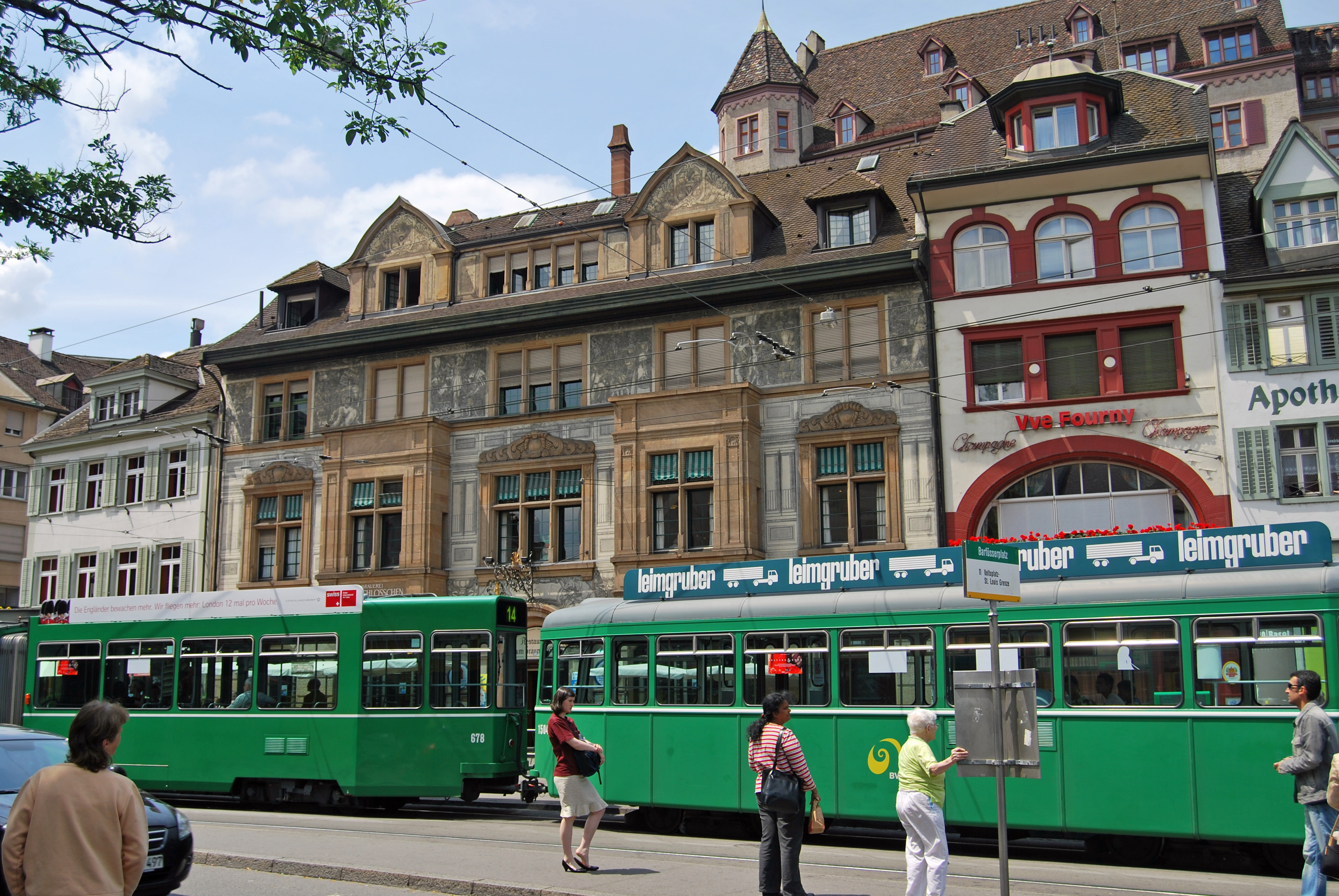
Basel (green trams in the city)

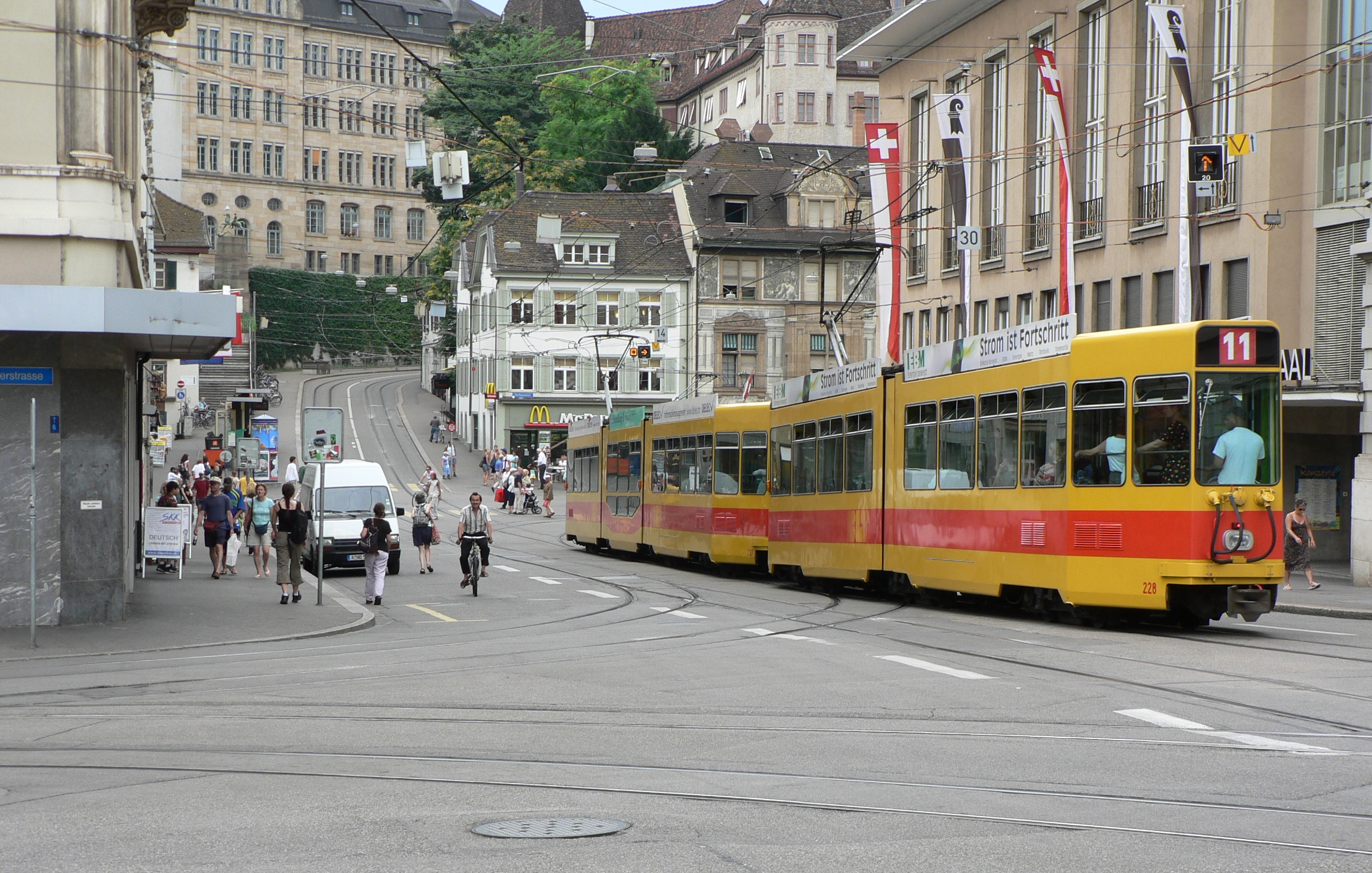
Basel (yellow trams link the suburbs)

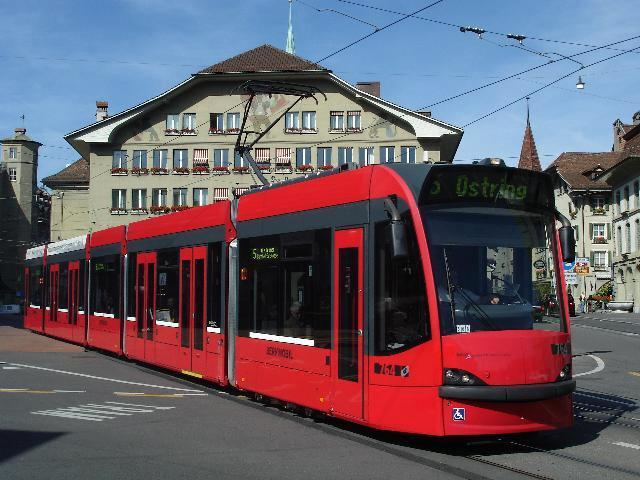
Bern

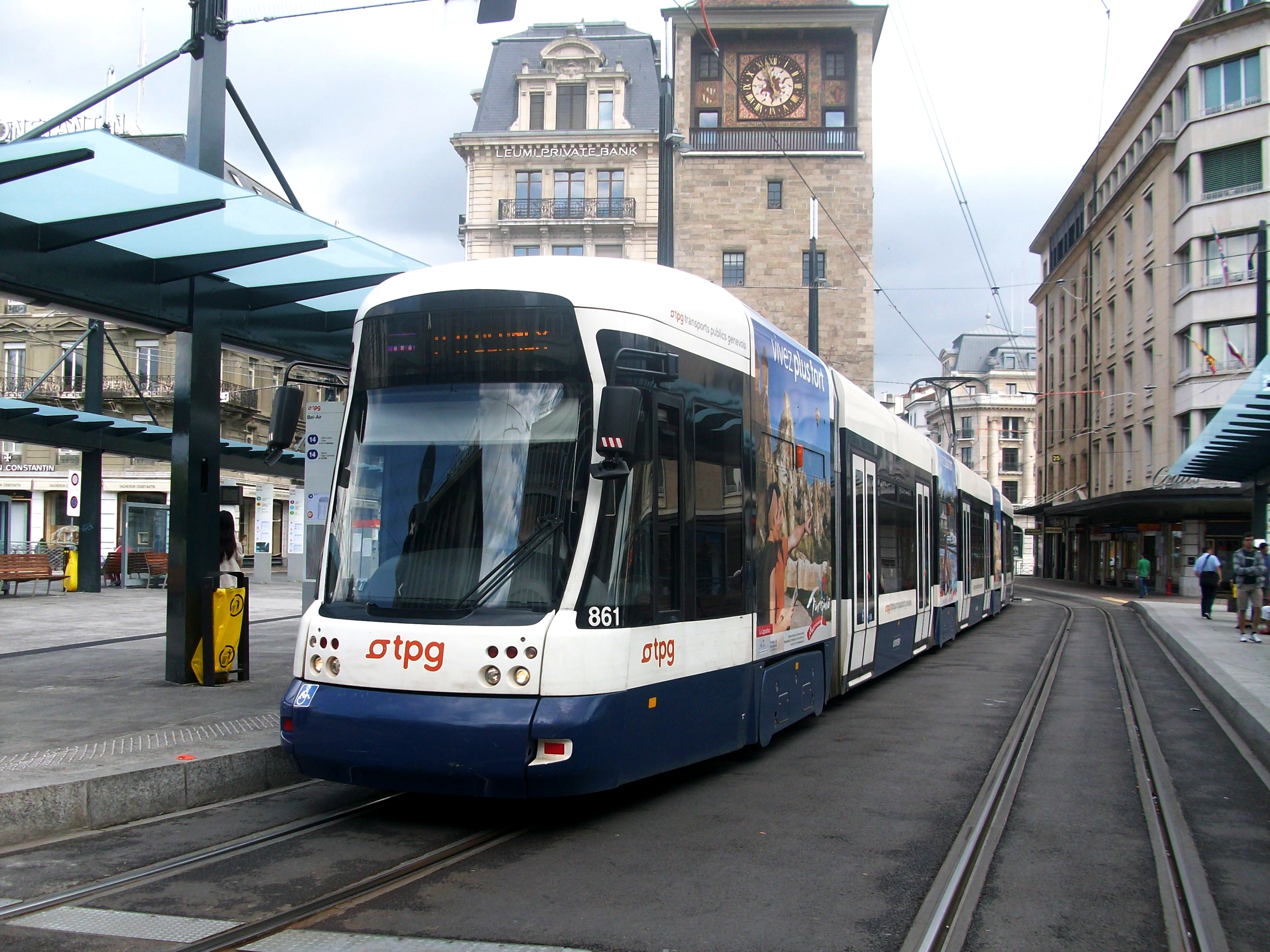
Geneva

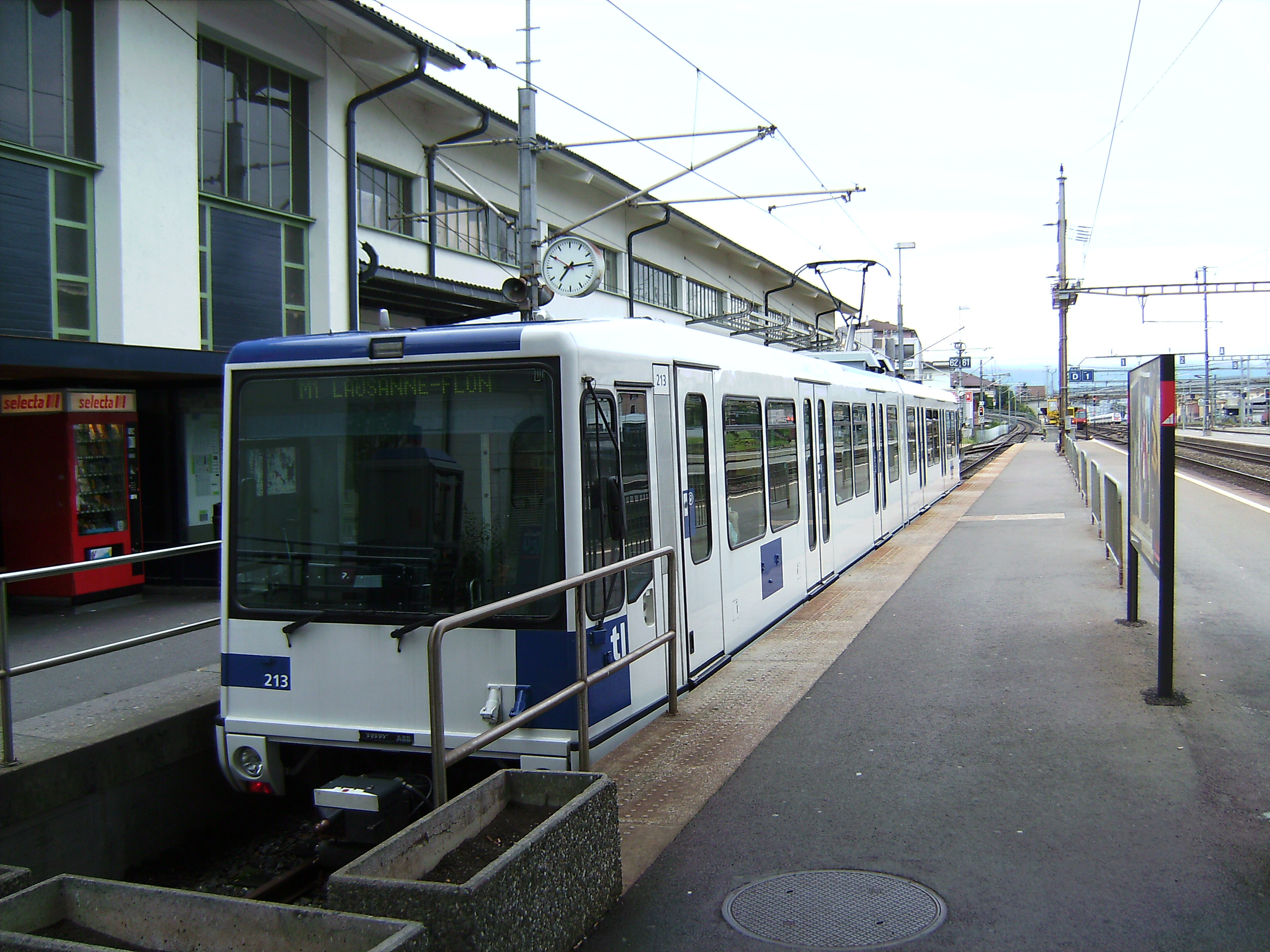
Lausanne

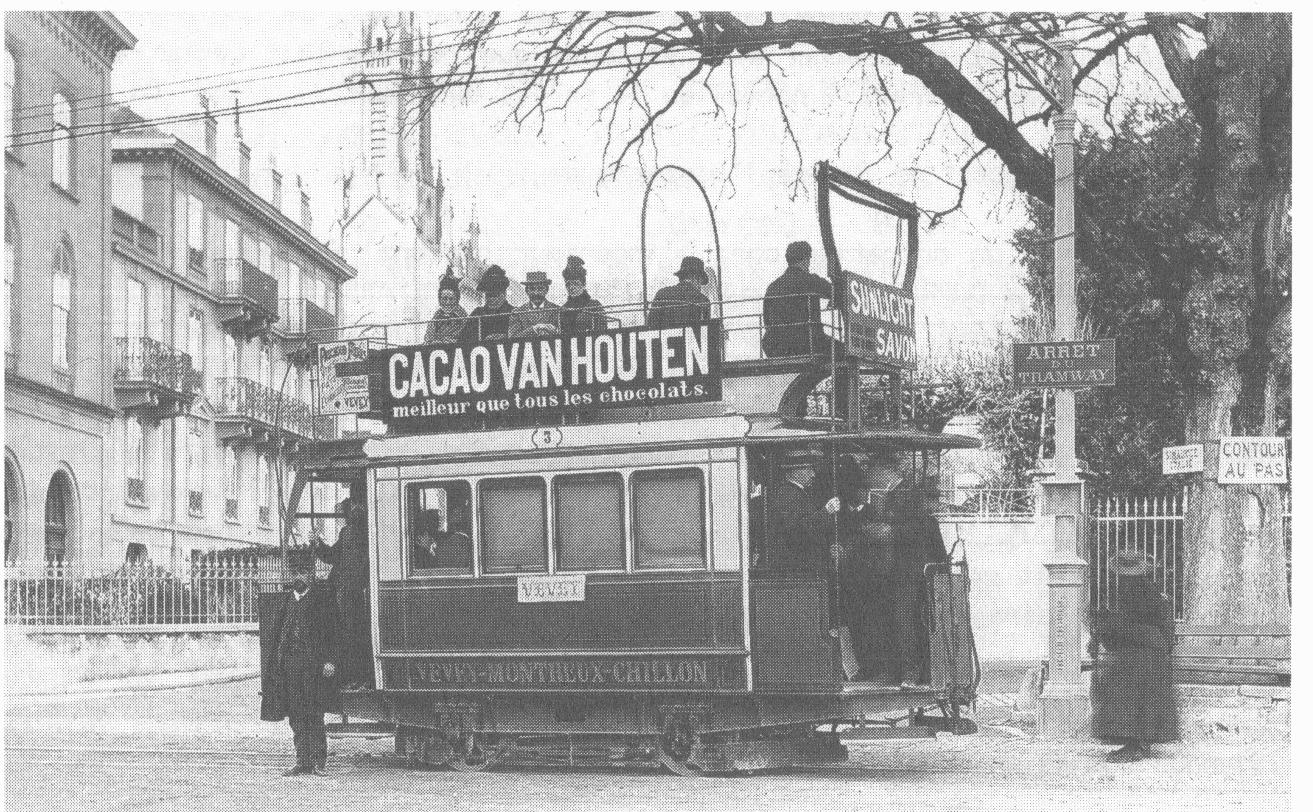
The first electric tramway in Switzerland, that became the Vevey–Montreux–Chillon–Villeneuve tramway, c.1890

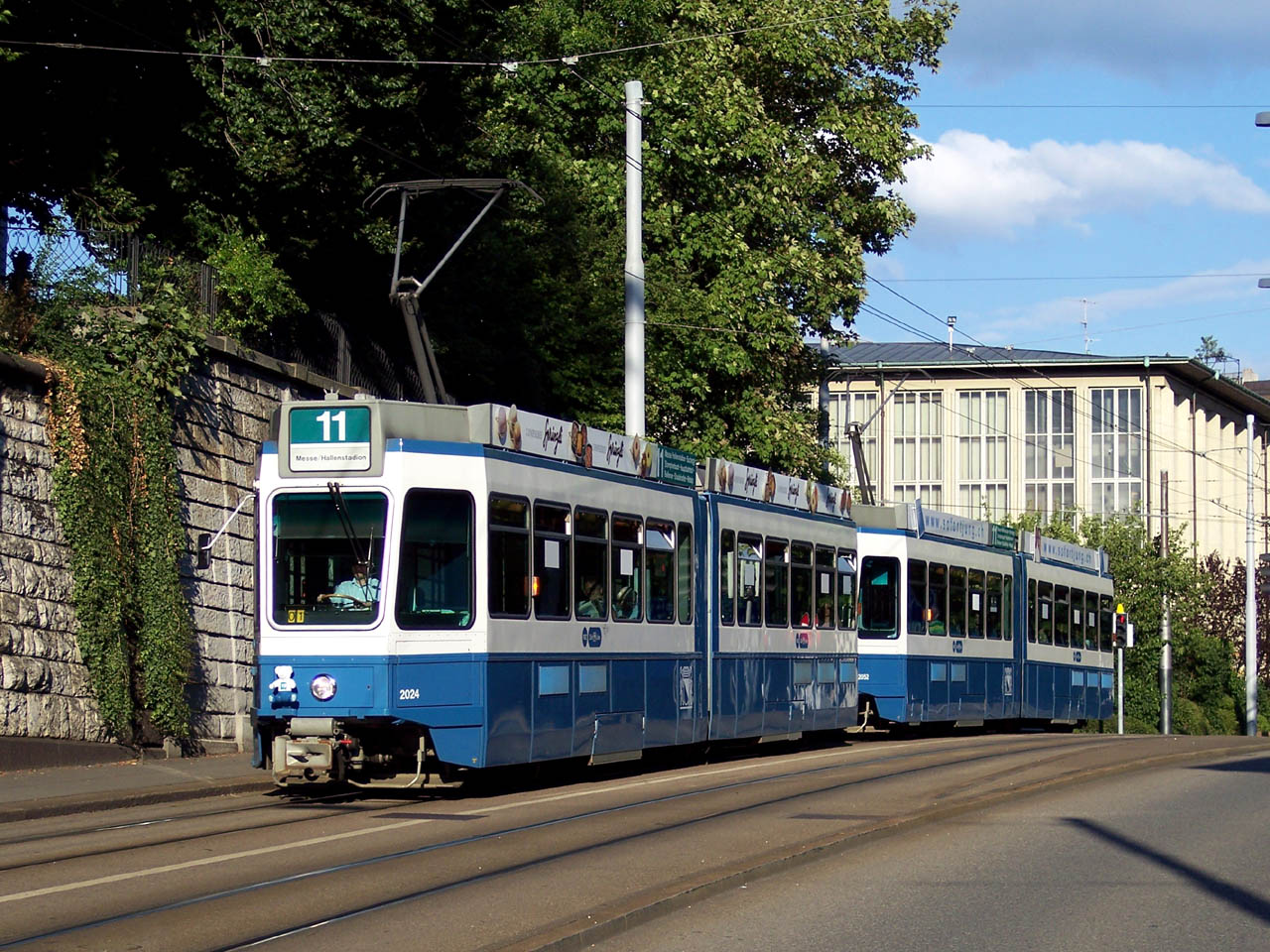
Zurich

Name of System & Operator	Location	Traction Type	Date (From)	Date (To)	Route length	Number of passengers	Notes
Strassenbahn Altdorf–Flüelen	Altdorf	Electric	25 Aug 1906	26 Mar 1951			
Trams in Basel; Basler Verkehrs-Betriebe	**Basel**	Electric	6 May 1892		72.9 km	60.39 million (2019)	Gauge: 1,000 mm (3 ft 3 3/8 in); Some tracks are shared with Baselland Transport
Trams in Basel; Baselland Transport	**Basel**	Steam	4 Oct 1887	2 Jun 1905			Gauge: 1,000 mm (3 ft 3 3/8 in)(?)
Trams in Basel; Baselland Transport	**Basel**	Electric	6 Oct 1902		64.96 km	28.4 million (2021)	Gauge: 1,000 mm (3 ft 3 3/8 in); Some tracks shared with Basler Verkehrs-Betriebe
Trams in Bern; Bernmobil (Städtische Verkehrsbetriebe Bern)	**Bern**	Compressed Air	1 Oct 1890	15 Nov 1901			Gauge: 1,000 mm (3 ft 3 3/8 in)(?)
Trams in Bern; Bernmobil (Städtische Verkehrsbetriebe Bern)	**Bern**	Steam	17 May 1894	6 Feb 1902			Gauge: 1,000 mm (3 ft 3 3/8 in)(?)
Trams in Bern; Bernmobil (Städtische Verkehrsbetriebe Bern)	**Bern**	Electric	1 Jul 1902		39.6 km	47.9 million (2021)	Gauge: 1,000 mm (3 ft 3 3/8 in)
Bex–Bévieux	**Bex**	Electric	10 Sep 1898	14 Jun 2002			Once daily service on this section restored in 2007.
Bex–Villars–Bretaye railway	**Bex**	Electric			17 km	0.74 million (2021)	Gauge: 1,000 mm (3 ft 3 3/8 in); Mostly a railway, but some of its sections run on streets
Trams in Biel/Bienne	Biel/Bienne	Horse	18 Aug 1877	30 Dec 1902			
Trams in Biel/Bienne	Biel/Bienne	Electric	31 Dec 1902	9 Dec 1948			
Clarens–Chailly–Blonay	Clarens	Electric	23 Nov 1911	31 Dec 1955			Gauge: 1,000 mm (3 ft 3 3/8 in)
Trams in La Chaux de Fonds	La Chaux de Fonds	Electric	1 Jan 1897	15 Jun 1950			
Trams in Fribourg	Fribourg	Electric	28 Jul 1897	31 Mar 1965			
Trams in Geneva; Transports Publics Genevois	**Geneva**	Horse	19 Jun 1862	21 Feb 1902			Gauge: 1,000 mm (3 ft 3 3/8 in)(?)
Trams in Geneva; Transports Publics Genevois	**Geneva**	Steam	20 Jul 1877	2 Jan 1902			Gauge: 1,000 mm (3 ft 3 3/8 in)(?)
Trams in Geneva; Transports Publics Genevois	**Geneva**	Electric	22 Sep 1894		50.5 km (2021)	73.5 million (2021)	Gauge: 1,000 mm (3 ft 3 3/8 in); additional 6 km under construction as the extension to St-Julien-en-Genevois
Trams in Lausanne	**Lausanne**	Electric	1 Sep 1896	6 Jan 1964			Gauge: 1,000 mm (3 ft 3 3/8 in) 550/600 V DC Overhead catenary
Lausanne tramway	**Lausanne**	Electric					4.6 km of new tracks under construction between Lausanne and Renens. Opening expected in 2026.Tramway Lausannois; Line M1 is light rail; Line M2 is rapid transit
Trams in Locarno	Locarno	Electric	3 Jul 1908	30 Apr 1960			
Trams in Lugano; Azienda comunale del traffico Lugano	Lugano	Electric	1 Jun 1896	17 Dec 1959			
Trams in Lugano; Lugano–Cadro–Dino railway (part)	Lugano	Electric	27 Jun 1911	31 Dec 1964			
Verkehrsbetriebe Luzern	Luzern	Electric	8 Dec 1899	11 Nov 1961			
Trams in Martigny-Bourg	Martigny	Electric	24 Oct 1906	31 Dec 1956			
Meiringen–Reichenbach–Aareschlucht tramway	Meiringen	Electric	24 Aug 1912	16 Sep 1956			Gauge: 1,000 mm (3 ft 3 3/8 in)
Tramway Bellavista	Mendrisio	Horse	1891	1913 or 1938			Gauge: 600 mm (1 ft 11 5/8 in)
Mendrisio electric tramway	Mendrisio	Electric	19 May 1910	31 Dec 1950			Gauge: 1,000 mm (3 ft 3 3/8 in)
Vevey–Montreux–Chillon–Villeneuve tramway	Montreux – Vevey	Electric	6 Jun 1888	19 Jan 1958			Gauge: 1,000 mm (3 ft 3 3/8 in)
Rollbahn Mürren	Mürren	Horse	10 Jul 1894	31 Dec 1945			
Trams in Neuchâtel	**Neuchâtel**	Steam	16 Dec 1892	24 Dec 1902			Gauge: 1,000 mm (3 ft 3 3/8 in)(?)
Trams in Neuchâtel	**Neuchâtel**	Horse	22 Dec 1894	15 Jul 1897			Gauge: 1,000 mm (3 ft 3 3/8 in)(?)
Trams in Neuchâtel	**Neuchâtel**	Electric	16 May 1897		8.85 km		Gauge: 1,000 mm (3 ft 3 3/8 in); The operator Transports publics Neuchâtelois considers the remaining line 215 to be light rail
Verkehrsbetriebe St. Gallen	St. Gallen	Electric	20 May 1897	1 Oct 1957			
Strassenbahn St. Moritz	St. Moritz	Electric	5 Jul 1896	18 Sep 1932			
Verkehrsbetriebe der Stadt Schaffhausen	Schaffhausen	Electric	11 May 1901	23 Sep 1966			
Schwyzer Strassenbahn	Schwyz	Electric	6 Oct 1900	15 Dec 1963			
Spiezer Verbindungsbahn	Spiez	Electric	2 Aug 1905	25 Sep 1960			
Strassenbahn Stanstad-Stans	Stans	Electric	28 Aug 1893	30 Sep 1903			
Verkehrsbetriebe Winterthur	Winterthur	Electric	30 Jul 1898	2 Nov 1951			
Zuger Berg und Strassenbahn	Zug	Electric	20 Mar 1907	11 May 1959			
Dolder Waldhaus–Dolder Grand Hotel	**Zürich**	Electric	5 Jul 1899	31 Dec 1930			
Trams in Zürich; Verkehrsbetriebe Zürich	**Zürich**	Horse	5 Sep 1882	4 Oct 1900			Gauge: 1,000 mm (3 ft 3 3/8 in)(?)
Trams in Zürich; Verkehrsbetriebe Zürich	**Zürich**	Electric	8 Mar 1894		125.1 km	134 million (2021)	Gauge: 1,000 mm (3 ft 3 3/8 in); Includes figures for Stadtbahn Glattal
Stadtbahn Glattal	**Zürich**	Electric	10 Dec 2006				Gauge: 1,000 mm (3 ft 3 3/8 in)

== See also ==
- Riffelalptram
- List of town tramway systems in Europe
- List of tram and light rail transit systems
- List of metro systems
- List of trolleybus systems in Switzerland
