= Besso, Ticino =

Coordinates: 46.004817°N 8.94197°E

Besso
- Quarter
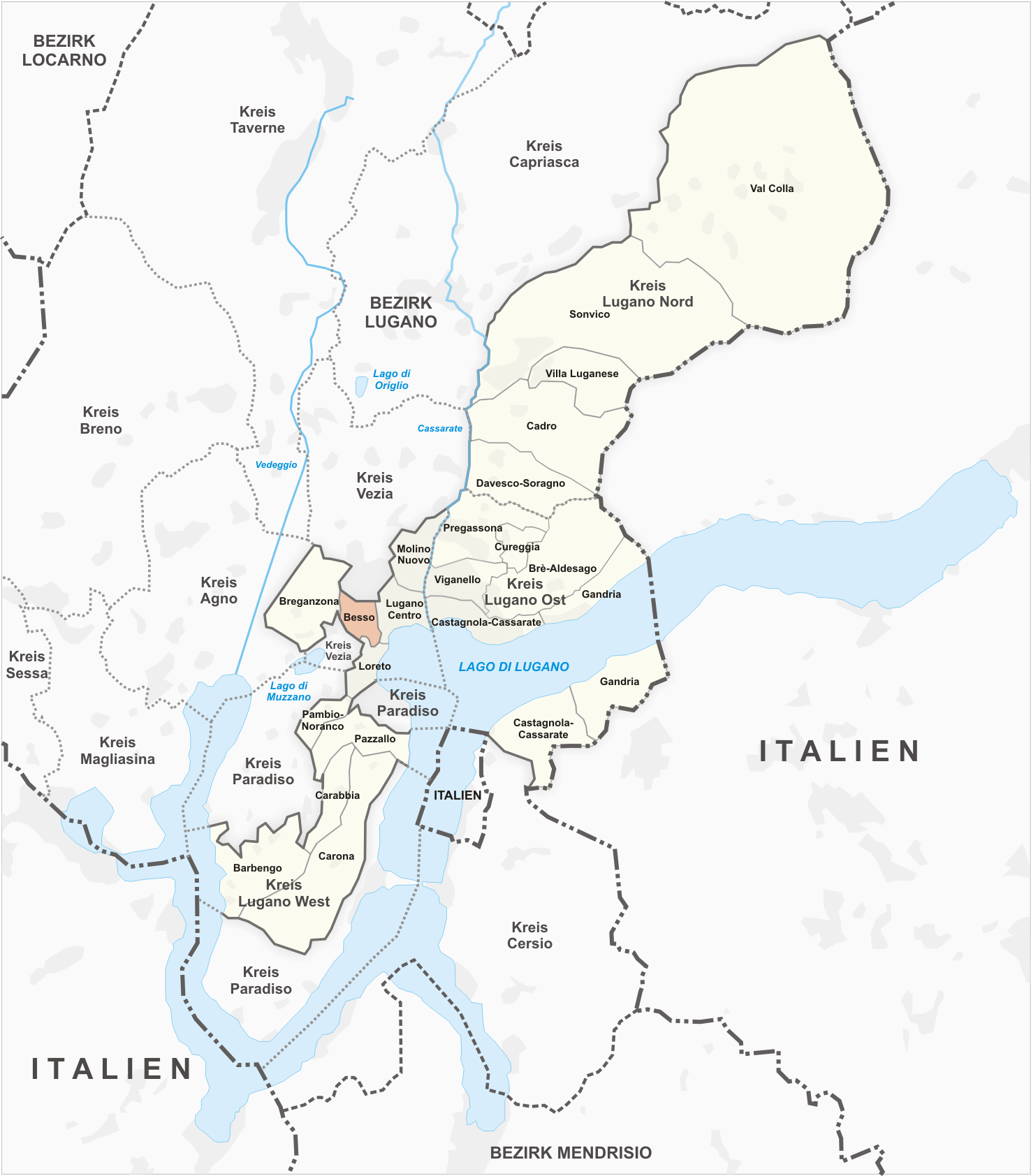
- Country: Switzerland
- Canton: Ticino
- District: Lugano
- City: Lugano

Population (2025-12-31)
  - Total: 5,218

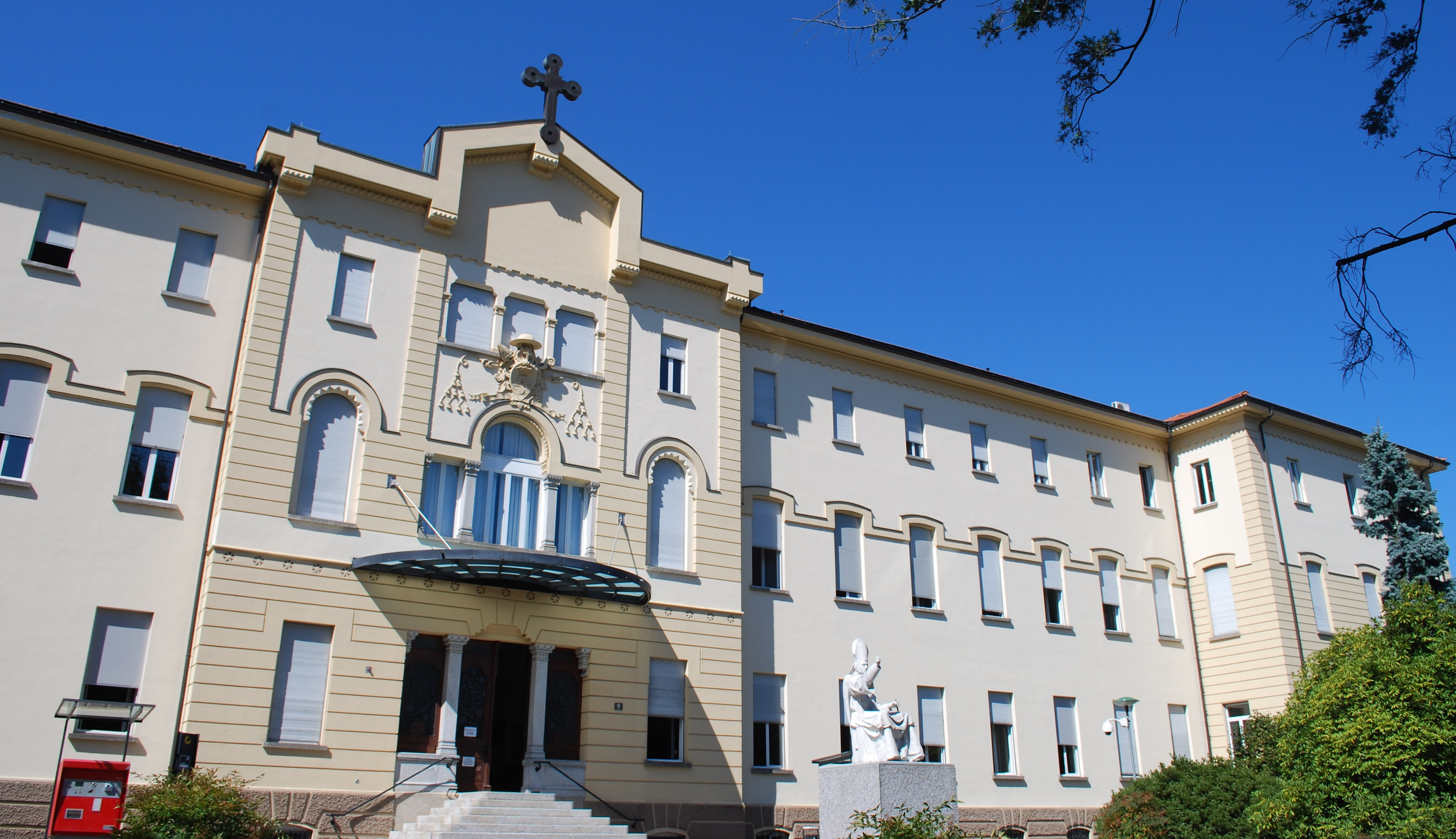
The seminary of St Carlo Borromeo, now the Swiss National Sound Archive

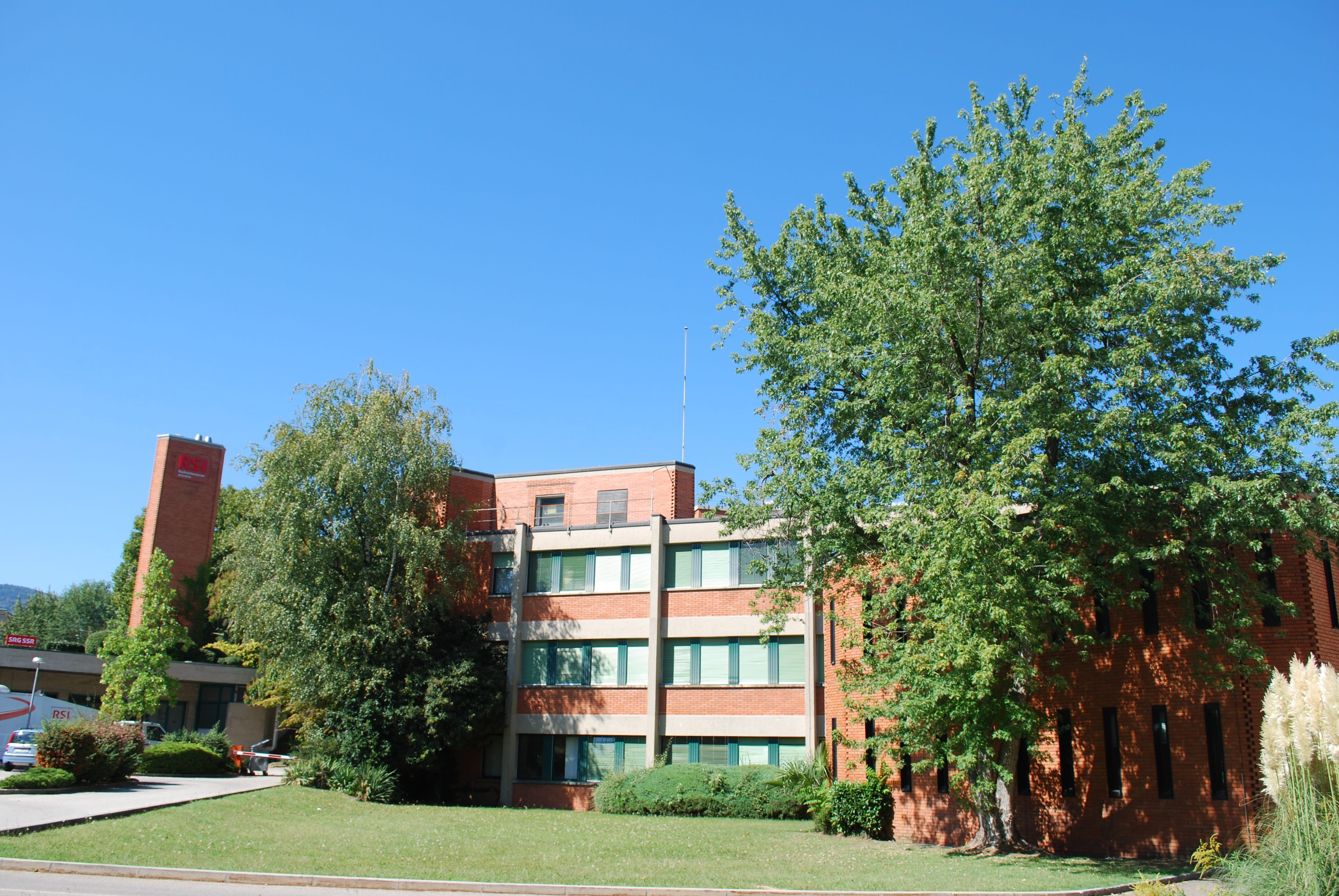
The RSI radio studio

Besso is a quarter of the city of Lugano, in the Swiss canton of Ticino. It forms the part of the city which is uphill of Lugano railway station, and is separated from the city centre by that station and its rail approaches. Besso was developed as a residential area in the late nineteenth century, driven by the opening of the railway in 1882. As of 2025, it had a population of 5,218.

Road access to the city centre is via a tunnel under the railway line, whilst access on foot is also possible using the station pedestrian subways, and thence the Lugano Città–Stazione funicular. Trasporti Pubblici Luganesi (TPL) bus route 3 connects Besso to the city centre, operating four or more buses per hour, whilst TPL route 16 connects an inner terminus on the Besso side of the railway station to Muzzano on a less frequent basis. The station can be directly accessed from the Besso side.

The administrative headquarters, and radio studios, of Radiotelevisione svizzera di lingua italiana (RSI), the Italian language Swiss TV and radio broadcaster, are in Besso. The former seminary, dedicated to Saint Carlo Borromeo, now houses the Swiss Italian Conservatory and the Swiss National Sound Archive.

Besso's church of Saint Nicholas of Flüe dates from 1950 and was built, by the architect Giuseppe Antonini, as a votive church. The facade is decorated with a mosaic by Francois Romand Ribas, whilst the separate bell tower contains five bells. The interior is notable for a bronze door by Venanzo Crocetti, a large ceramic by Angelo Biancini depicting four saints, and stained glass windows by the Swiss artist Willy Kaufmann.

Besso is home to a kindergarten, an elementary school and a middle school, as well as a branch of the Federal Institute for Vocational Education and Training. The Parco Tassino is a 21,000 square metres (230,000 sq ft) public park in the south-east of the quarter, famous for its display of roses.
