= Lugano railway station =

Railway station in Lugano, Switzerland

Lugano
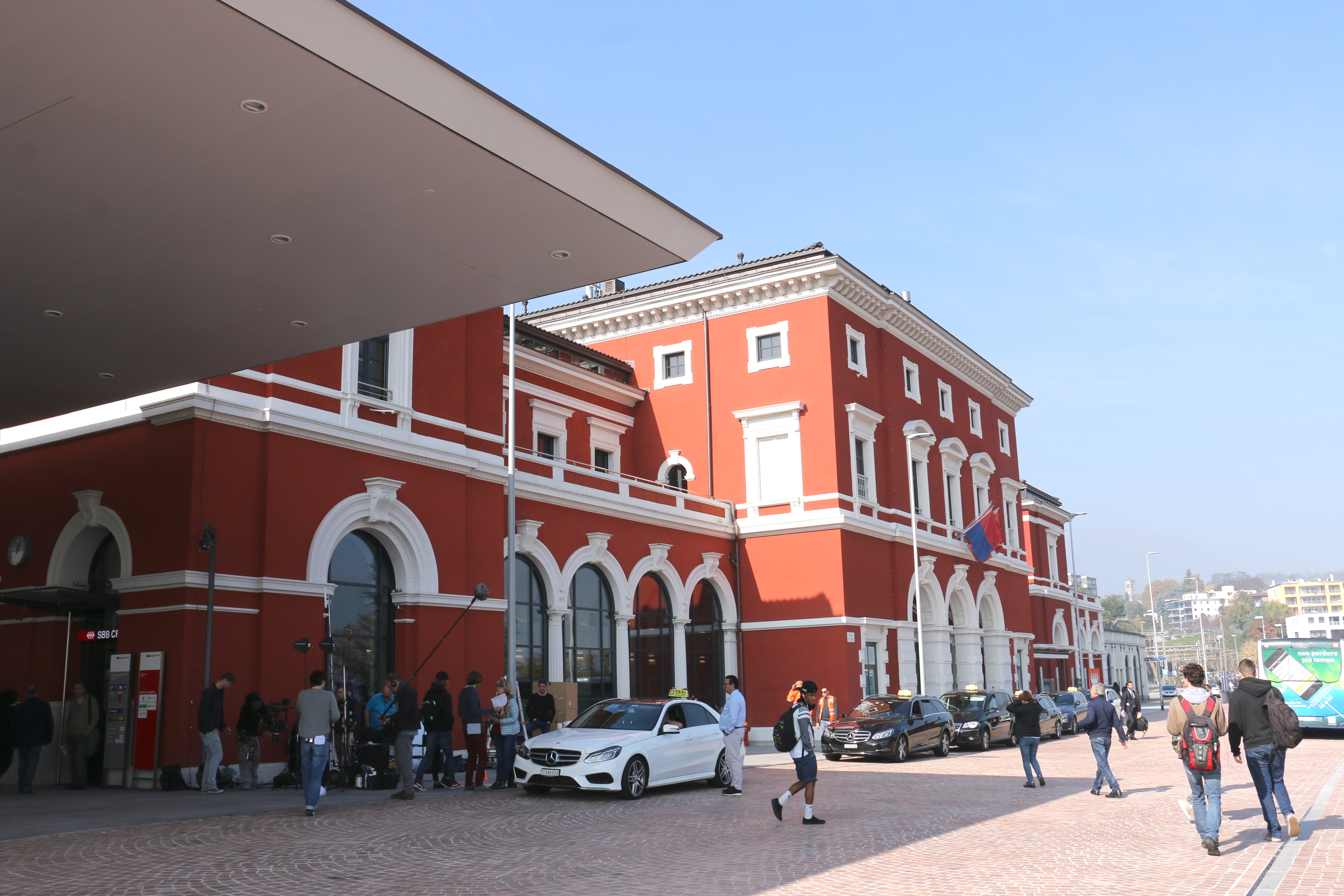
- The station building in 2017

General information
- Location: Piazzale della Stazione; Lugano; Switzerland
- Coordinates: 46°00′20″N 8°56′49″E
- Elevation: 335 m (1,099 ft)
- Owner: Swiss Federal Railways
- Line: Gotthard line
- Distance: 180.5 km (112.2 mi) from Immensee
- Platforms: 4
- Tracks: 4
- Train operators: Swiss Federal Railways; Treni Regionali Ticino Lombardia
- Connections: Autolinee Regionali Luganesi; Lugano Città–Stazione funicular; Autopostale; Trasporti Pubblici Luganesi

Other information
- IATA code: QDL
- Fare zone: 10/100 (Arcobaleno)

History
- Opened: 6 December 1874
- Electrified: 6 February 1922

Passengers
- 2025: 32,300 per day (RhB, SBB)
- Rank: 21 out of 1,095

Services
Preceding station	SBB CFF FFS	Following station
Bellinzona towards Frankfurt (Main) Hbf	EuroCity	Chiasso towards Milano Centrale
Bellinzona towards Zürich HB	EuroCity	Chiasso towards Bologna Centrale, Genova Piazza Principe, Milano Centrale or Venezia Santa Lucia
Bellinzona towards Zürich HB	IC 2	Terminus
Bellinzona towards Basel SBB	IC 21	Terminus
Preceding station	TiLo	Following station
Sant'Antonino towards Locarno	RE80	Lugano-Paradiso towards Milano Centrale
Giubiasco towards Airolo	S10	Lugano-Paradiso towards Como San Giovanni
Giubiasco towards Airolo	S50	Lugano-Paradiso towards Malpensa Aeroporto Terminal 2
Lamone-Cadempino towards Giubiasco	S90	Lugano-Paradiso towards Mendrisio
Location
- Location within Switzerland Location within Canton of Ticino

Lugano railway station (Italian: Stazione di Lugano) is the main railway station of the city of Lugano, in the Swiss canton of Ticino. The station is on the Gotthard railway and is also the terminus of the Lugano Città–Stazione funicular. The metre gauge Lugano–Ponte Tresa Railway (FLP) has a separate station at Lugano FLP railway station across the station forecourt from the main line station.

The station is situated on a hillside to the west of the city centre, overlooking the city and Lake Lugano, and the funicular provides a direct link from the station to the city centre below. The residential quarter of Besso lies above and to the west of the station. The station is nicknamed Terrazza del Ticino ("Terrace of Ticino") since the opening of the Gotthard Base Tunnel in 2016.

== History ==
The Gotthard railway's station was opened in 1874, as part of that railway's Lugano to Chiasso line. By 1882, with the opening of the line across the Monte Ceneri Pass to Bellinzona, and the Gotthard Rail Tunnel beyond that, Lugano was connected with the rest of the canton of Ticino and with northern Switzerland.

The Lugano Città–Stazione funicular opened in 1886, and was followed by the Lugano–Tesserete railway (LT) in 1909, and the Lugano–Ponte Tresa railway (FLP) in 1912. The LT operated from a terminus and depot to the north-east of the main station, whilst the FLP constructed a terminus at a lower level to the south-east of the main station. Additionally, in 1910, a branch of the city's urban tramway was extended to the station forecourt.

Until 1927 the station formed a barrier between the city to one side, and the suburb of Besso to the other. However, in that year a road tunnel and pedestrian subway were constructed under the railway, which allowed the extension of the city's trams to Besso. In 1943, Piazzale di Besso was created to the west of the station.

The Lugano tramway closed in the 1950s. The Lugano–Tesserete railway closed in 1967, and the site of its station is now occupied by the regional bus stop and turning circle at the northern end of the station forecourt. The first section of its trackbed now forms a pedestrian ramp down to Via S. Gottardo, and the site of its depot is a car park.

In 1998 a project was initiated to improve the railway station facilities and the surrounding areas, designed by the architect Aurelio Galfetti. This has included the redevelopment of the forecourt of the station, especially in terms of pedestrian safety. In 2007 the station underpass was restored, and a third (northern) platform was constructed, which allows access to the station from the north.

The opening of the Ceneri Base Tunnel in December 2020 reduced travel times from Bellinzona to Lugano by 15 minutes.

== Facilities ==
The station is owned and operated by the Swiss Federal Railways. It contains four tracks, arranged with flanking side platforms and a central island platform. The main station buildings are on the platform on the city centre side of the station, but there is also access from the Besso side of the station to the adjacent platform. Both of these platforms, and the island platform between them, are linked by two pedestrian underpasses.

In front of the station is a large forecourt, from which traffic other than buses and taxis is excluded. Local buses of the Trasporti Pubblici Luganesi (TPL) operate from the southern end of the forecourt, whilst regional buses of the AutoPostale and Autolinee Regionali Luganesi operate from the northern end. The station to city funicular, also operated by TPL, runs from a platform directly adjacent to the main station building, descending in tunnel under the forecourt.

The station does not include any freight handling facilities. Freight in the Lugano area is handled through the Lugano Vedeggio freight yard, constructed in the 1970s and accessed via a branch from the Gotthard railway near Taverne-Torricella station.

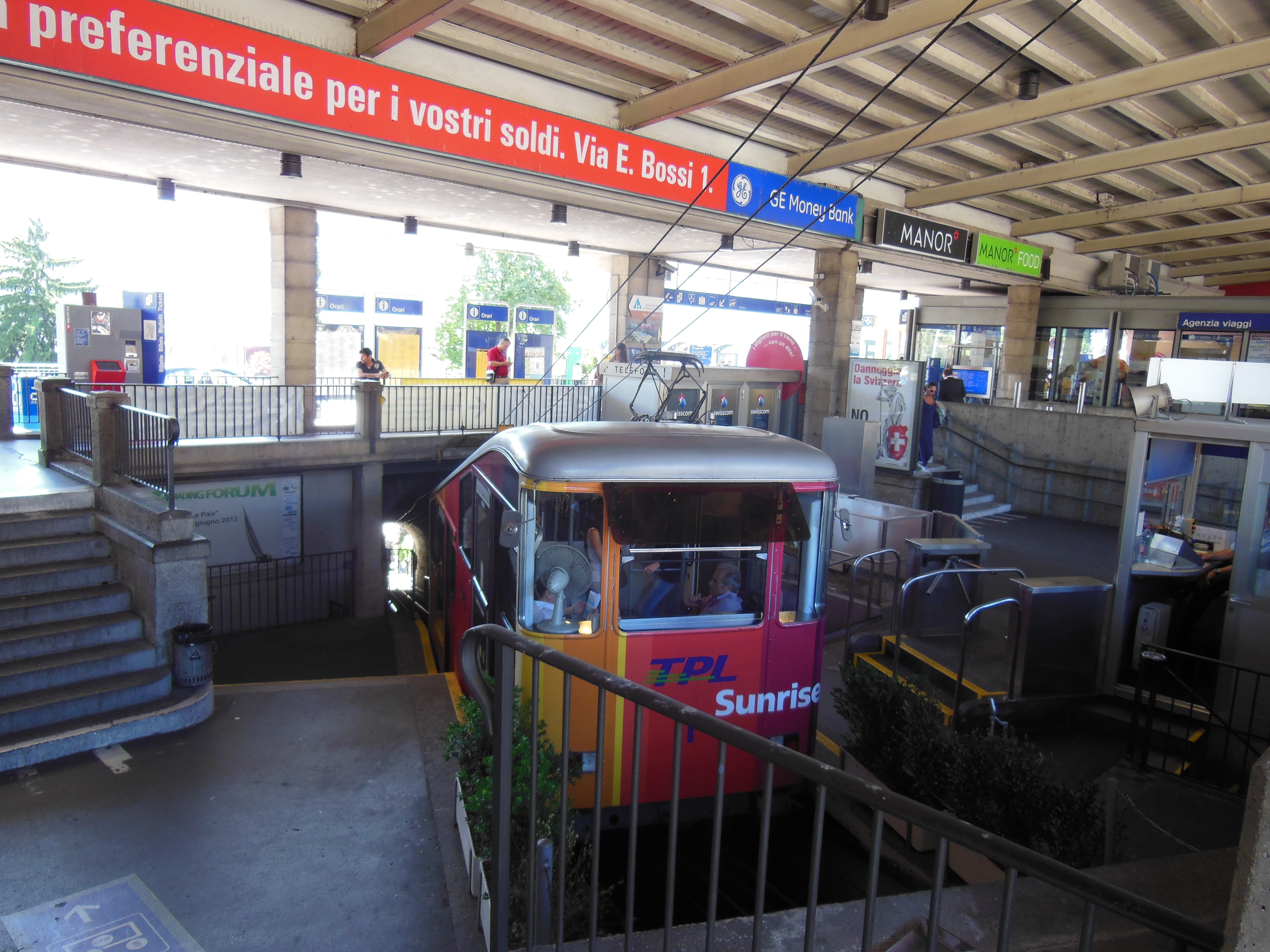
Funicular seen from main line platform

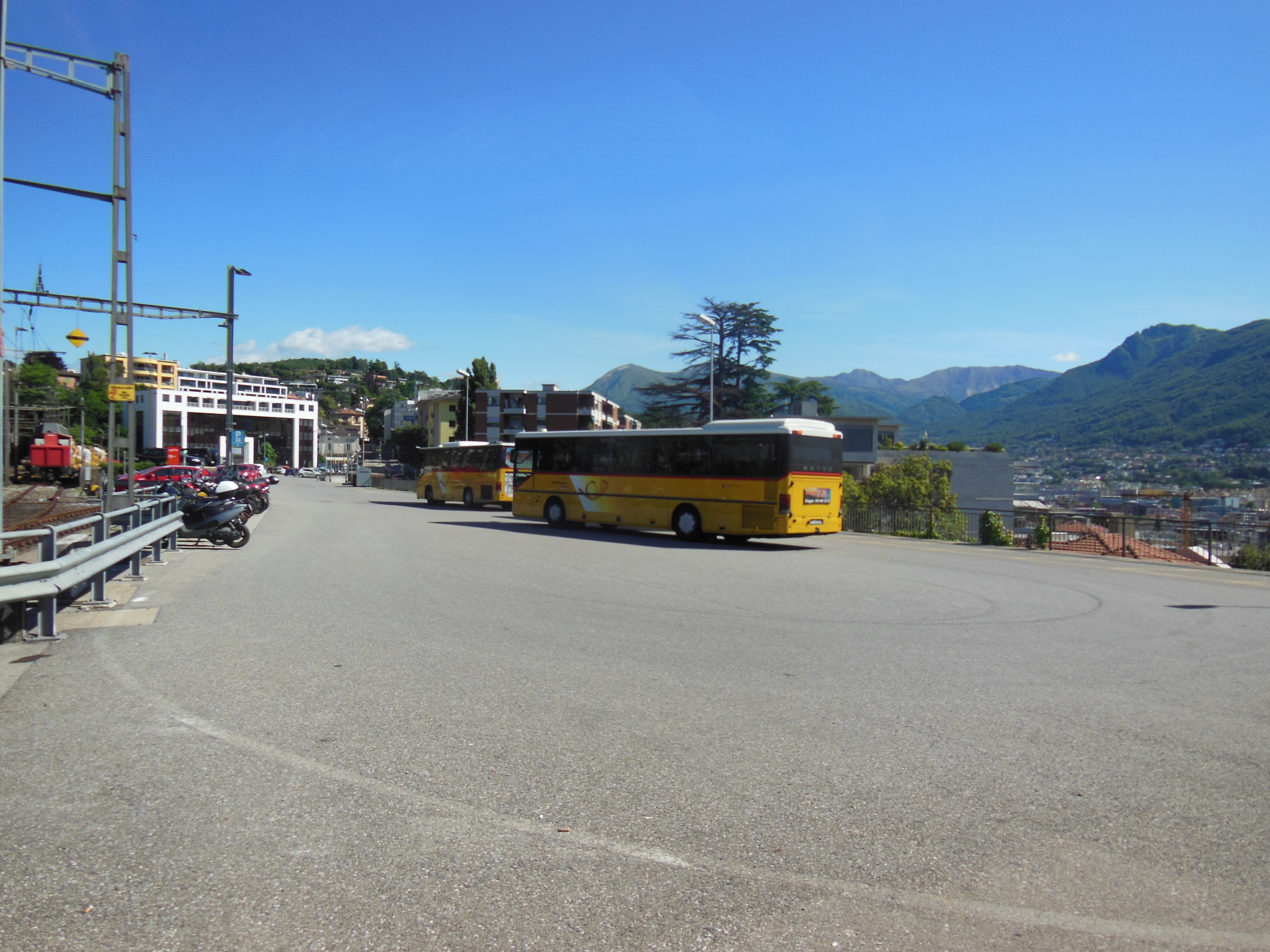
Regional bus stop on the site of the LT terminus

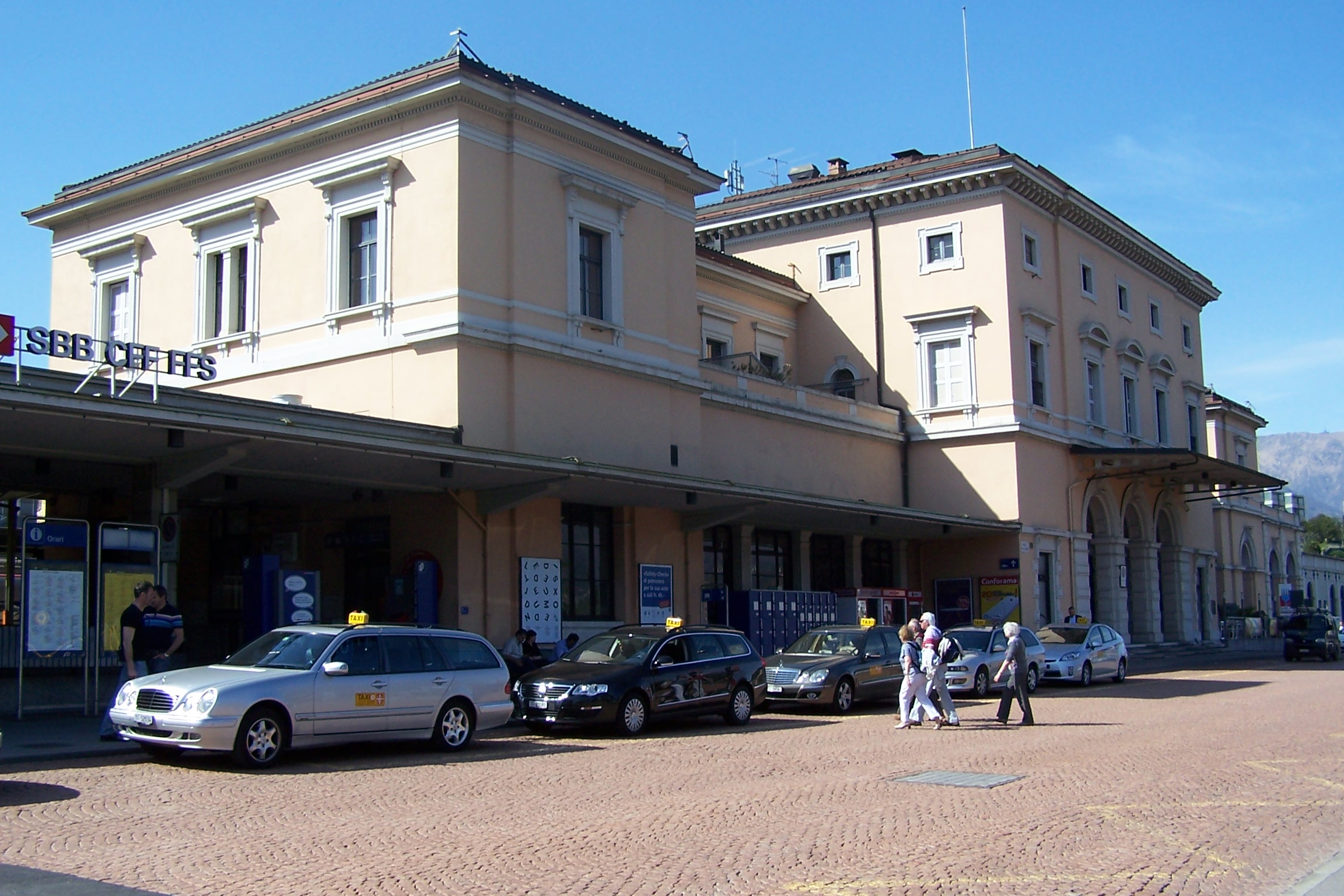
Lugano main line station building prior to the 2016-17 renovation

== Services ==
Located near the southern end of the Gotthard railway and the southern portal of the Ceneri Base Tunnel, Lugano is served by long-distance trains from northern Switzerland, principally Zürich and Basel, including EuroCity trains to Milan in Italy. It is also served by local trains of the Treni Regionali Ticino Lombardia (TILO).

As of the December 2021 timetable change, the following services stop at Lugano:

- EuroCity / InterCity: half-hourly service to Arth-Goldau; hourly service to Bologna Centrale, Genova Piazza Principe, Milano Centrale, Milano Porta Garibaldi, or Venezia Santa Lucia; hourly to half-hourly service to Zürich Hauptbahnhof, and service every two hours to Basel SBB.
- RE80: half-hourly service to Locarno and Chiasso and hourly service to Milano Centrale.
- S10 / S50: half-hourly service to Bellinzona, Biasca and Mendrisio and hourly service to Chiasso, Como San Giovanni, or Malpensa Aeroporto Terminal 2.
- S90: half-hourly service to Giubiasco, serving stations on the original high level Ceneri pass route, and hourly service to Mendrisio.
- Gotthard Panorama Express: daily tourist oriented service via the original high level Gotthard tunnel, with connecting boat service on Lake Lucerne to Lucerne.

All the above services, with the exception of the S90, use the new Ceneri Base Tunnel. All of the Eurocity and InterCity services also use the new Gotthard Base Tunnel to pass under the Alps. Passengers wishing to use the older, higher and more scenic high level Gotthard route across the Alps must either use the daily Gotthard Panorama Express, or change at Bellinzona.

The Lugano Città–Stazione funicular, one of Switzerland's busiest funicular lines, runs continuously from 05:20 to 23:50, seven days a week.

Selected city bus routes of the Trasporti Pubblici Luganesi (TPL), and some regional routes of the AutoPostale and Autolinee Regionali Luganesi (ARL), serve the station. However the main hubs of Lugano's bus network are elsewhere, with TPL and ARL serving a city centre bus station a few minutes walk from the lower terminus of the funicular, and AutoPostale using an underground bus station to the north of the city centre.

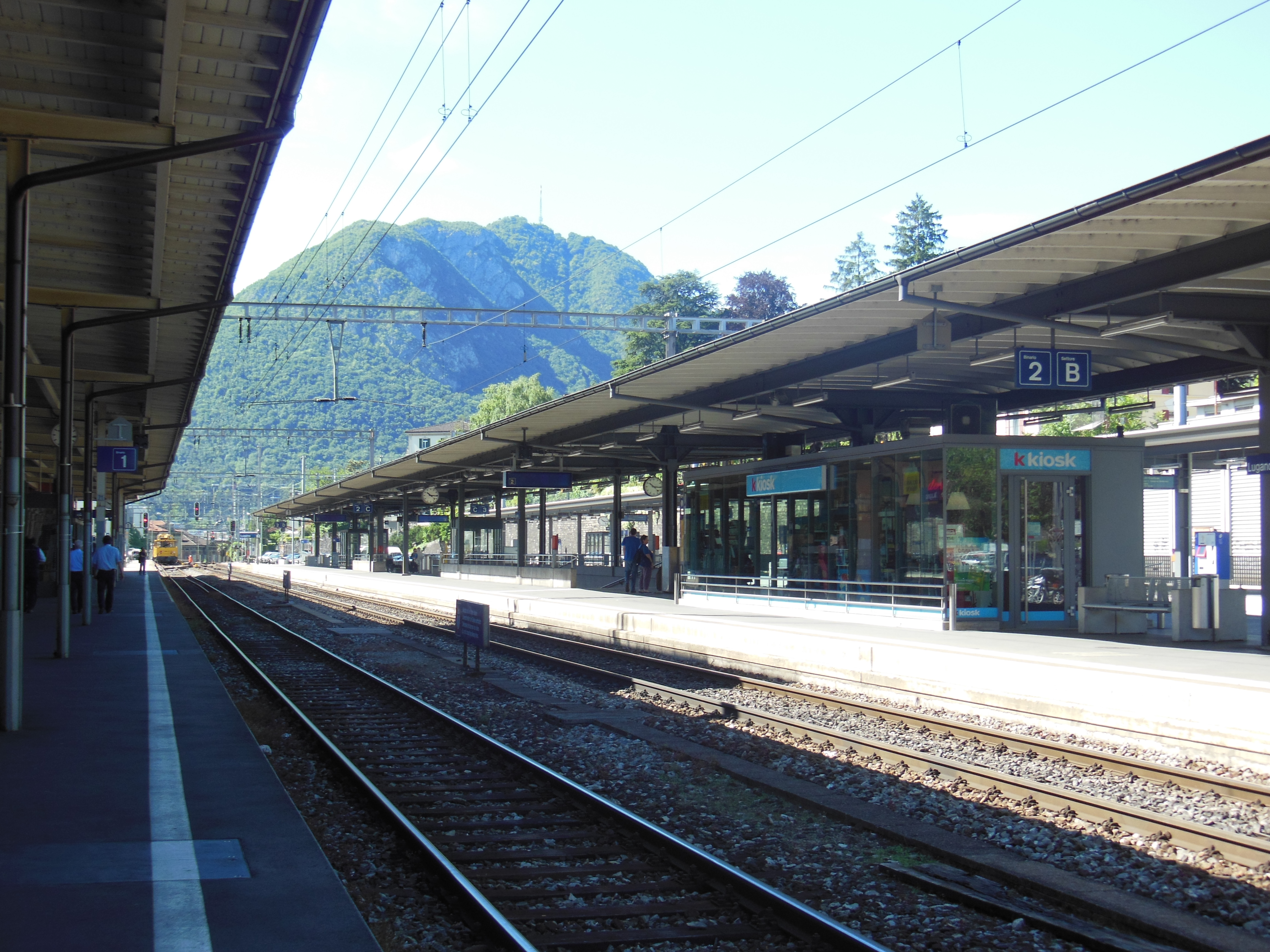
View from main line platform 1 to south

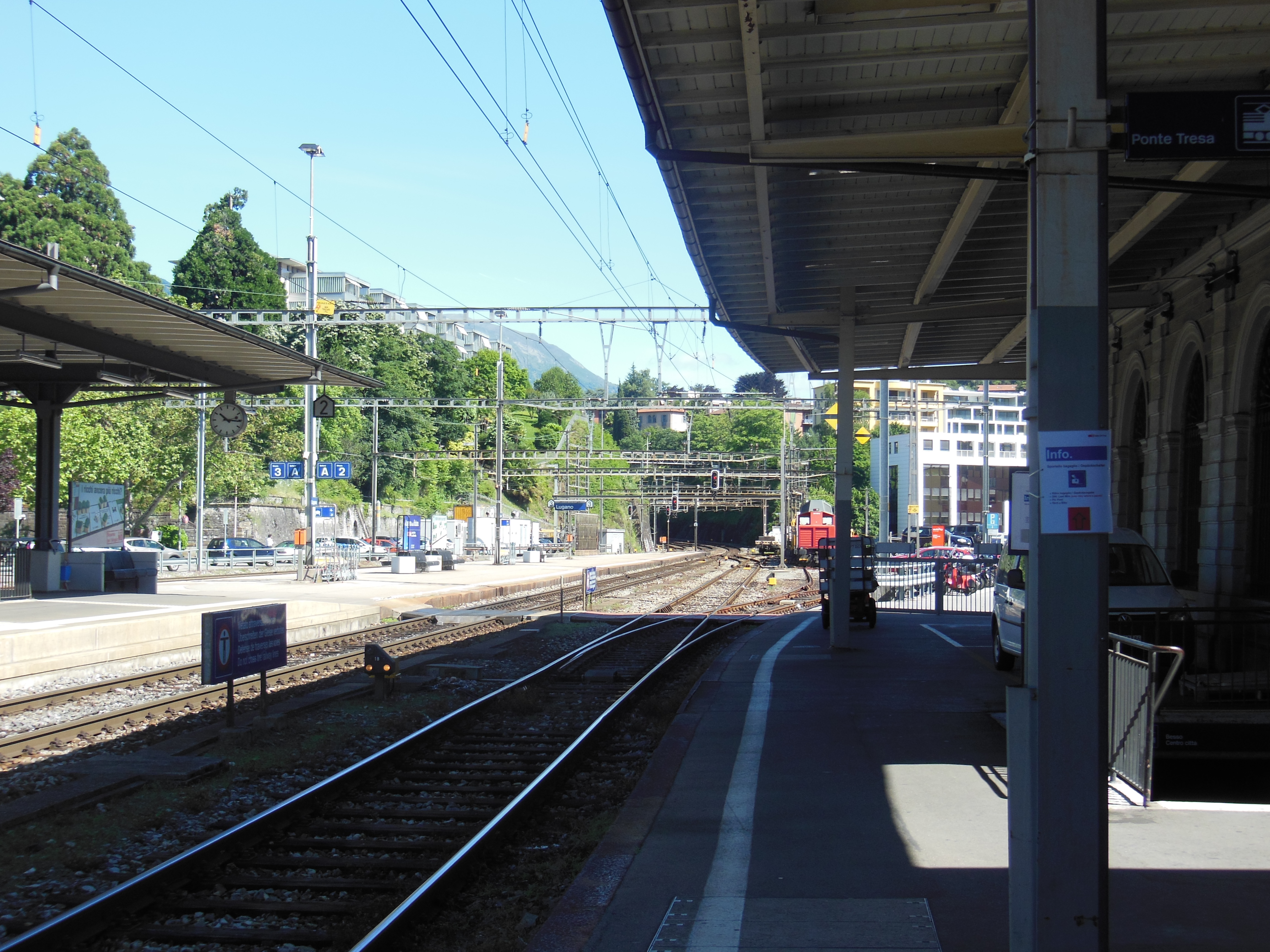
View from main line platform 1 to north

== See also ==
- Rail transport in Switzerland
