= Trasporti Pubblici Luganesi =

Public transport operator in Lugano, Switzerland

- Industry: Transport
- Founded: 1884 (current name: 2000)
- Headquarters: Lugano, Switzerland
- Area served: Lugano and surrounding suburbs
- Owner: City of Lugano; Canton of Ticino; Municipality of Massagno; Municipality of Paradiso; Municipality of Savosa; Municipality of Vezia
- Website: http://www.tplsa.ch/

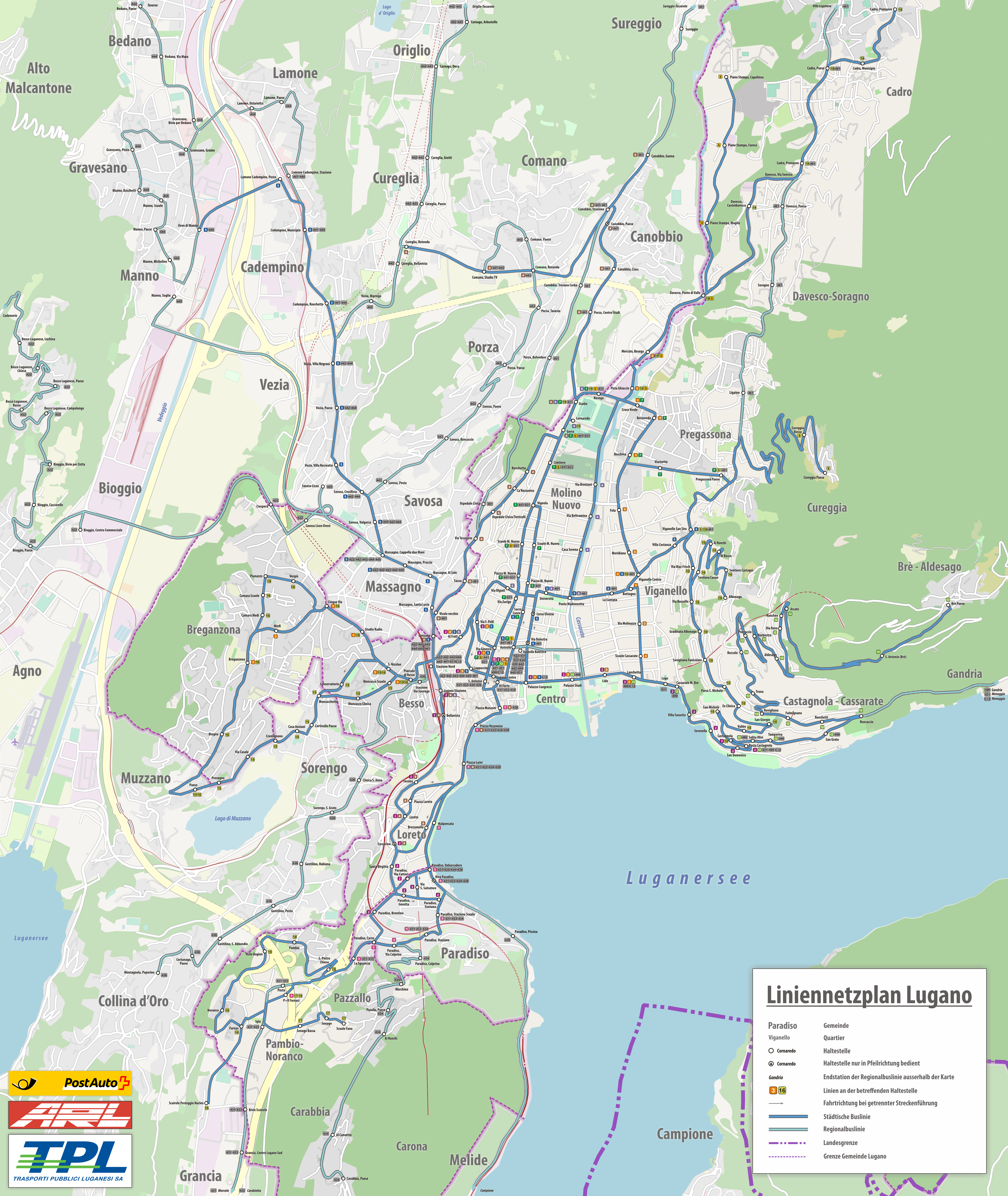
Network map as of 13 December 2020

Trasporti Pubblici Luganesi (TPL) is a public transport operator in and around the Swiss city of Lugano. Previously known as the Società luganese dei tramway elettrici, Tranvie elettriche comunali, Azienda comunale del traffico (ACT) and Azienda comunale dei trasporti della Città di Lugano (ACTL), the organisation was founded in 1884 and adopted its current name in 2000.

TPL operates the city's urban bus network, along with a funicular that links the city's railway station with the city centre. It is a private limited company whose shares are mostly owned by the city of Lugano (58.56%) and the canton of Ticino (30.44%), with the remaining shares are owned by neighbouring municipalities. It is a member of the arcobaleno tariff network.

== History ==
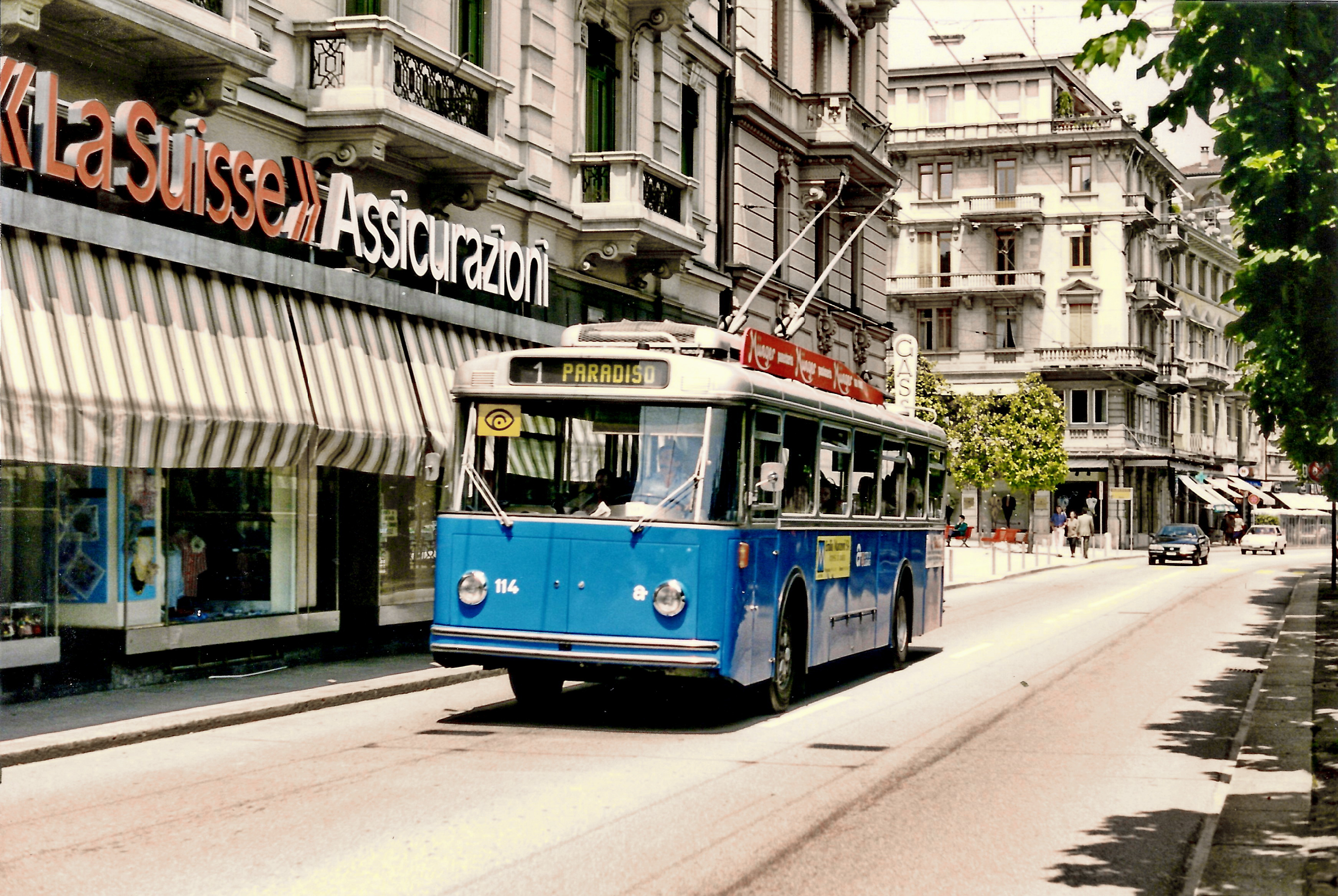
An early trolleybus still in service in 1994

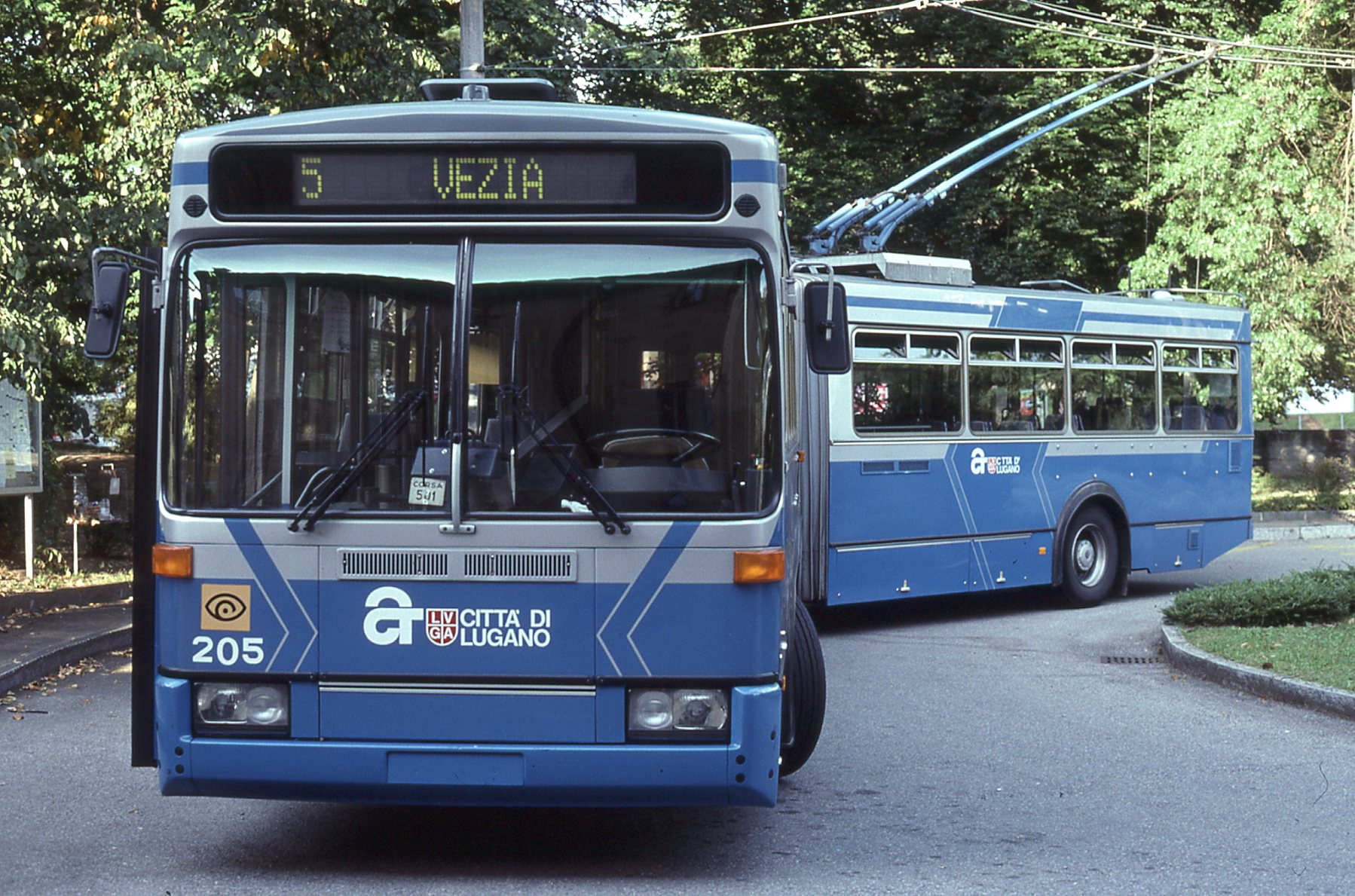
An articulated Lugano trolleybus in 1997

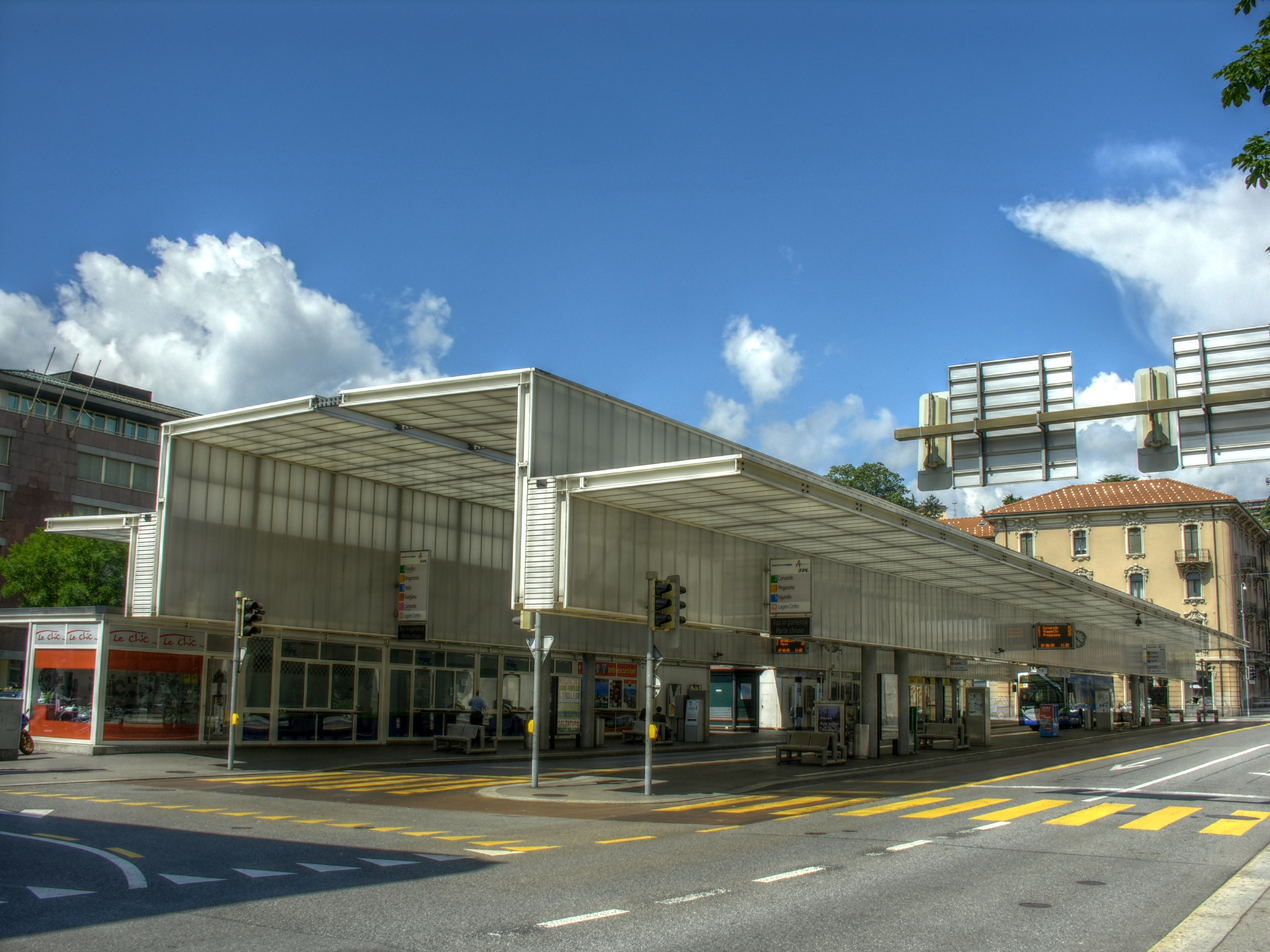
TPL's central bus station in 2009

=== Beginnings ===
Lugano station was opened in 1874, as part of the Gotthard railway's Lugano to Chiasso line. By 1882, with the opening of the line across the Monte Ceneri Pass to Bellinzona, and the Gotthard Rail Tunnel beyond that, Lugano was connected with the rest of the canton of Ticino and with northern Switzerland.

However the station was located well above the city itself, which had developed alongside Lake Lugano. To link the two, the Lugano Città–Stazione funicular was opened in 1886. Initially it was operated by water power.

=== Tramways ===
Economic development, not least because of the coming of the railway, lead to Lugano spreading beyond its original lakeside core, resulting in further need for local transportation. The Società luganese dei tramway elettrici (Lugano Electric Tramway Company) was responsible for constructing the city's urban tramways, which went into service in 1896.

The company was taken over by the city of Lugano in 1918 and the name changed to Tranvie elettriche comunali (Municipal Electric Tramways). At its peak, the tram network served outer termini at Besso, Cassarate, Cimitero Nuevo and Paradiso.

By the 1950s the decision had been taken to replace the trams with trolleybuses.

=== Trolleybuses ===
The first trolleybus route opened in 1954, the system had progressively replaced the Lugano tramway network by 1959, and was significantly expanded between 1975 and 1981. At its height, the system consisted of four lines, with outer termini at Breganzona, Castagnola, Paradiso, Pregassona and Vezia. By this stage, the organisation had changed its name to the Comunale dei Trasporti della Città di Lugano (Municipal Transport Company of Lugano, or ACTL).

The Lugano trolleybuses operated at 1,000 V DC, inherited from the tram system and unusually high for trolleybuses. This was one of the principal reasons behind the system's eventual demise, with few manufacturers interested in supplying new vehicles at that voltage. Consideration was given to closure from at least 1995, and the last services ran in 2001.

=== Recent times ===
In 2000, ACTL was converted into the Trasporti Pubblici Luganesi, a joint stock company owned by Lugano and other local and cantonal authorities.

Between 2000 and 2002, a new bus station was constructed on the Piazzale Ex-Scuole in central Lugano for use by the TPL. The station was designed by the architect Mario Botta, and has a central, 7 metres (23 ft) high nave with two 5 metres (16 ft) high side aisles, with a translucent plexiglas covering.

== Operation ==
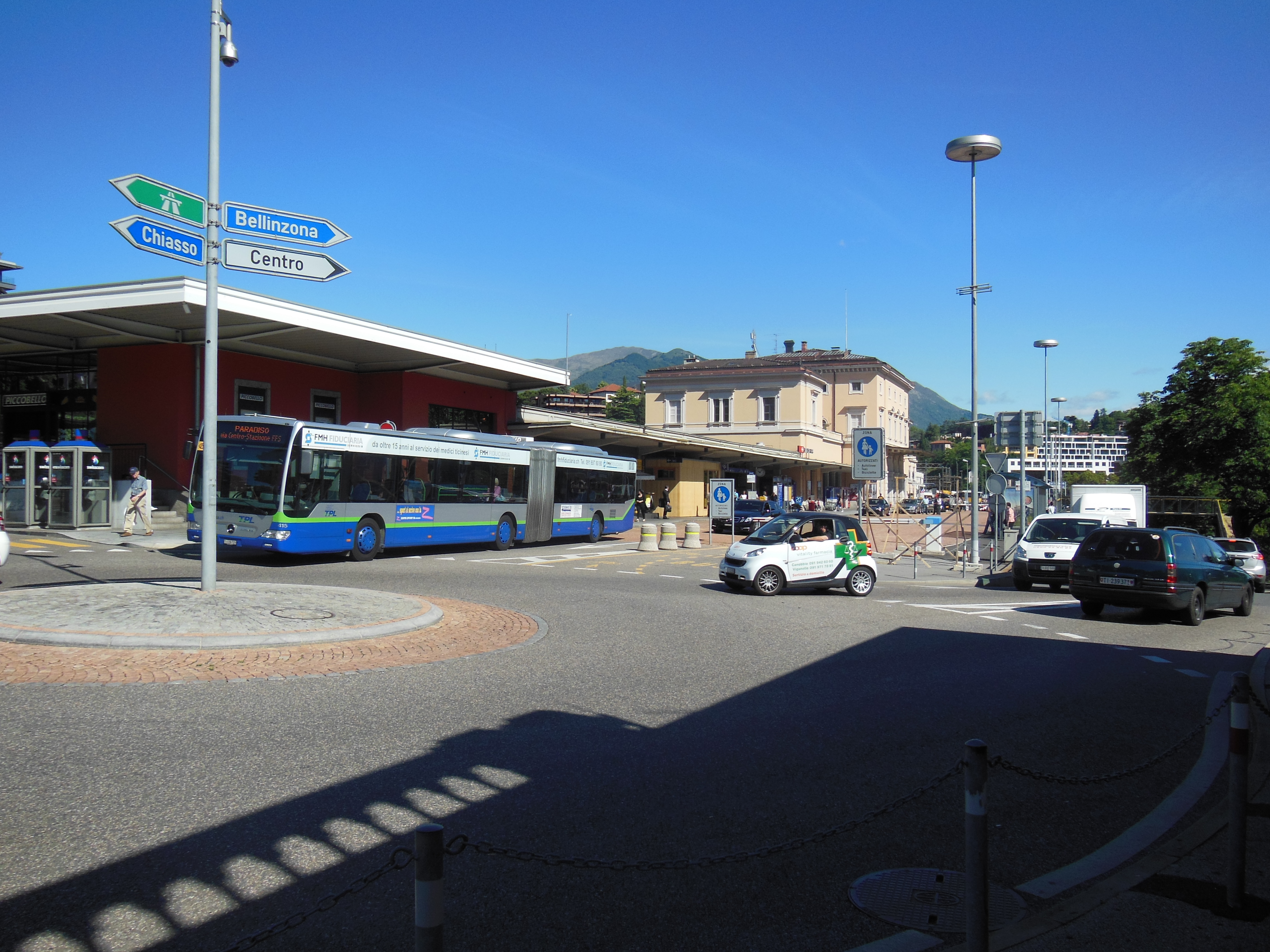
An articulated TPL bus at the city's railway station

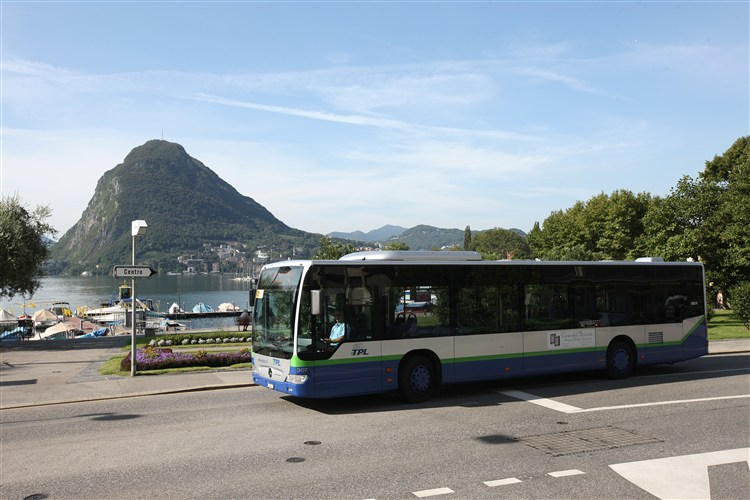
A modern city bus

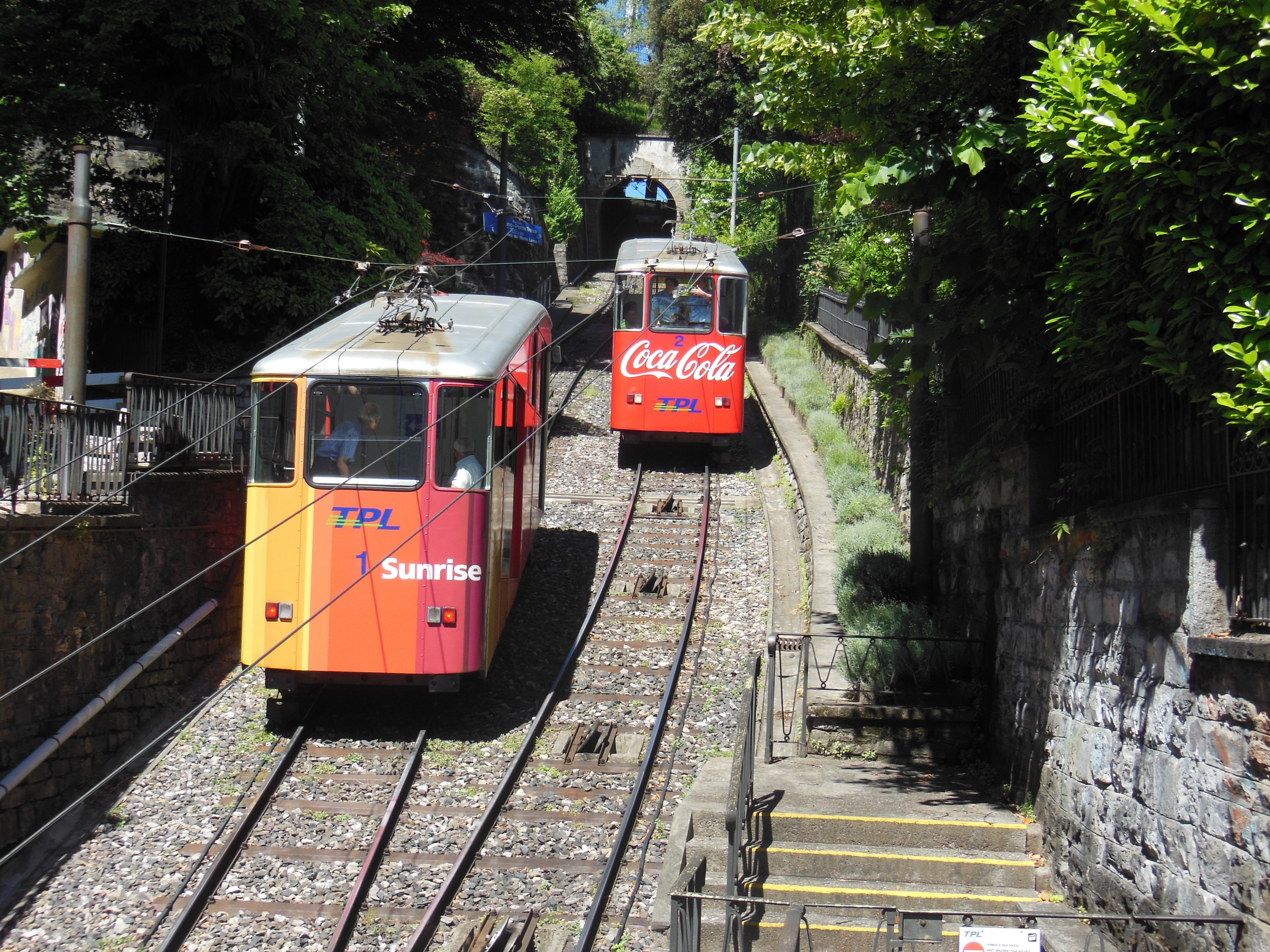
The city to station funicular, prior to the 2016 renovation

=== Bus routes ===
The company operates the following routes (frequency may be reduced on weekends and evenings): Line 1: Lugano Centro - Paradiso; Line 2: Paradiso - Castagnola; Line 3: Mercato Resega - Breganzona; Line 4: Lugano Centro - Canobbio; Line 5: Viganello - Lamone Cadempino; Line 6: Stazione FFS - Cornaredo; Line 7: Lugano Centro - Pregassona; Line 8: P+R Fornaci - Scairolo; Line 8: P+F Fornaci - Senago; Line 9: Viganello - Cureggia; Line 10: Viganello - Albonago; Line 11: Lugano Centro - Ruvigliana; Line 12: Lugano Centro - Brè; Line 16: Besso - Muzzano;

Line F: P+R Fornaci - Lugano Centro; Line S: P+R Cornaredo - Lugano Centro

=== Funicular ===
The Lugano Città–Stazione funicular links Central Lugano with Lugano station, and runs continuously from 05:20 to 23:50, seven days a week.

=== Tariffs and tickets ===
TPL is a member of the arcobaleno tariff network, and issues and accepts arcobaleno tickets on all services, both bus and funicular. Tickets are normally sold through ticket machines at most bus stops, but can also be bought from the driver if the stop has no ticket machine. The funicular has staffed ticket booths at both terminals.

== See also ==
- Transport in Switzerland
- List of bus operating companies in Switzerland
