= Lugano Città–Stazione funicular =

Funicular railway in the city of Lugano, Ticino, Switzerland

Coordinates: 46.004906°N 8.948262°E

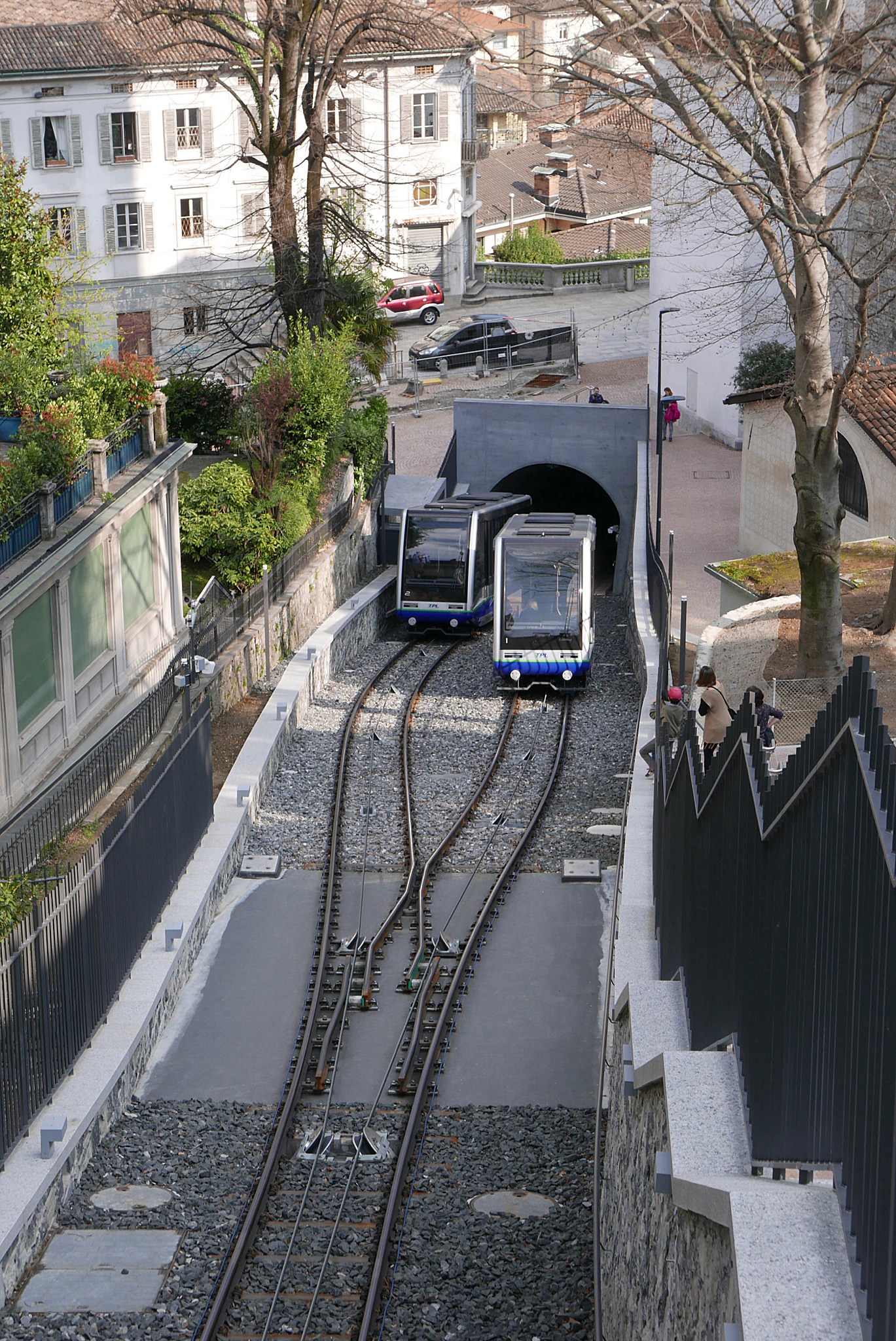
- Both of the post-2016 cars at the passing loop

Overview
- Other name(s): Funicolare Lugano Città–Stazione; Sassellina
- Status: In operation
- Locale: Lugano, Switzerland
- Termini: "Lugano Città" at Piazza Cioccaro; "Lugano Stazione"
- Stations: 3 (including "Lugano Cattedrale")

Service
- Type: Funicular
- Route number: 2650
- Operator: Trasporti Pubblici Luganesi (short: TPL)
- Rolling stock: 2 for 100 passengers each
- Ridership: 1,972,789 (2021)

History
- Opened: 8 November 1886 (139 years ago)
- Intermediate station: 2016

Technical
- Track length: 206 metres (676 ft)
- Num of tracks: 1 with passing loop
- Rack system: (before 1955: Abt)
- Track gauge: 1,000 mm (3 ft 3 3/8 in)
- Electrification: 1955 (water counterbalancing before)
- Highest elevation: 335 m (1,099 ft)
- Maximum incline: 25.3%

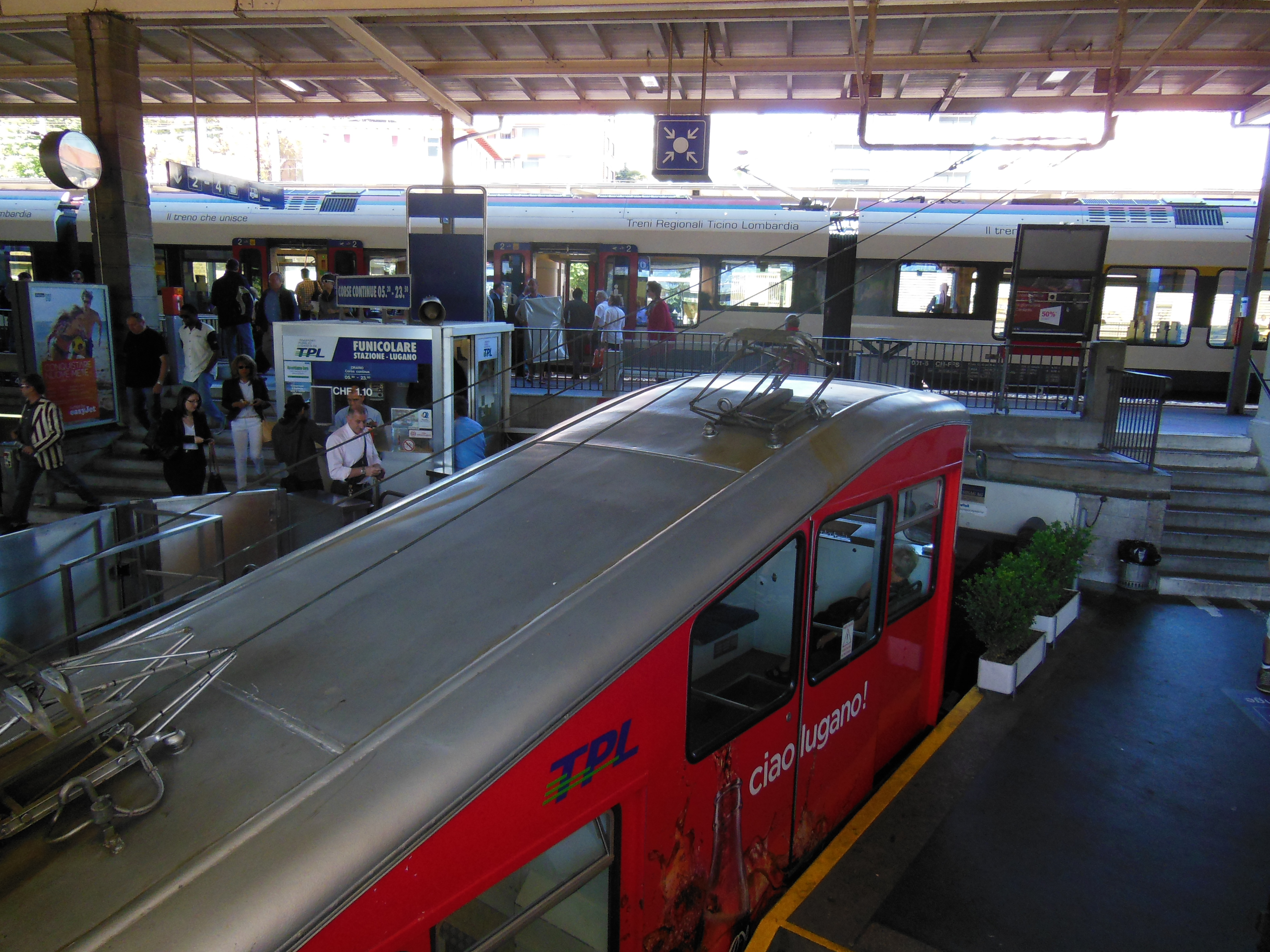
The pre-2016 upper terminus within the railway station

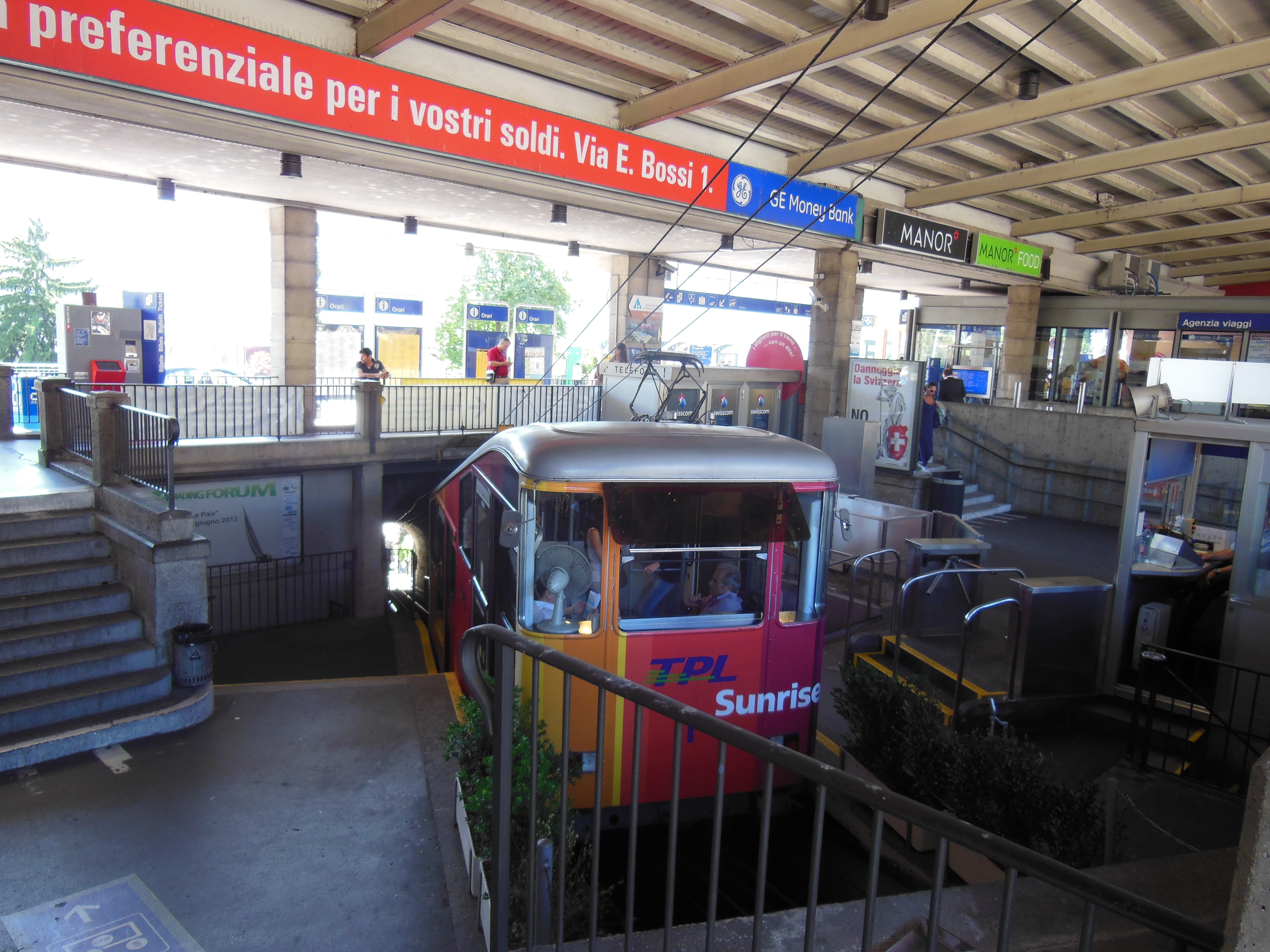
The pre-2016 upper terminus looking the other way

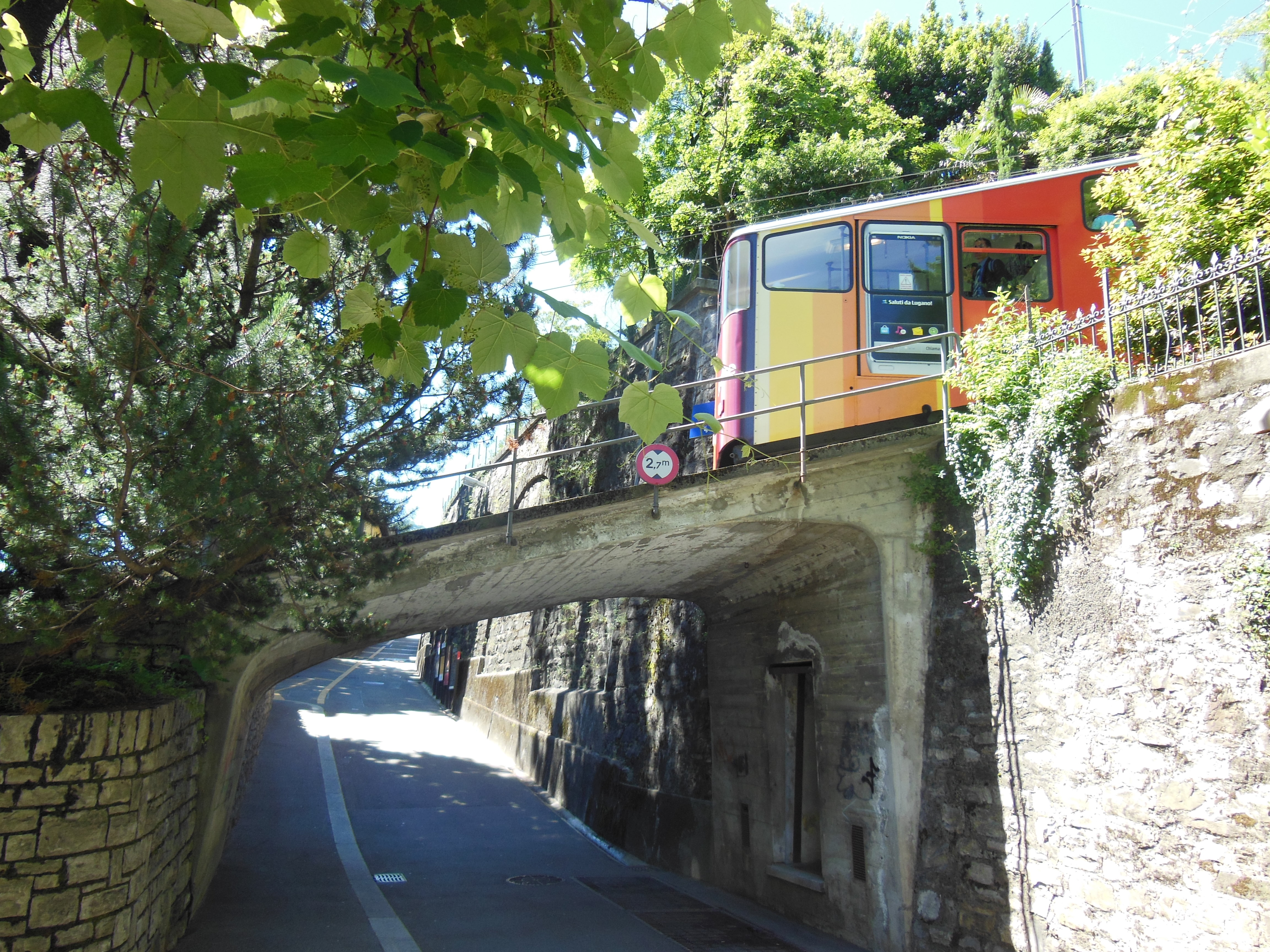
Car passing over the Via degli Amadio

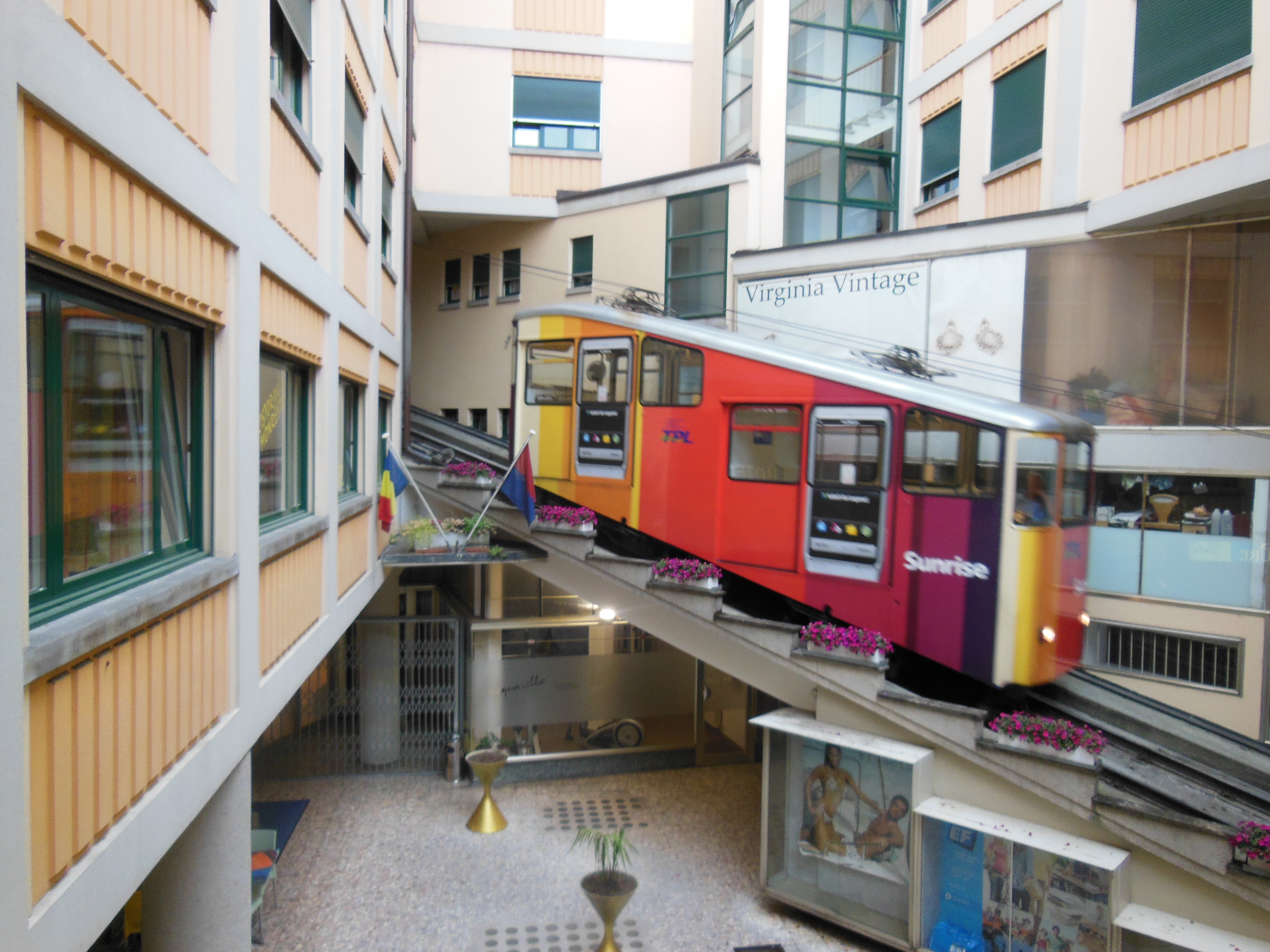
A pre-2016 car passing through the Acquarello Hotel

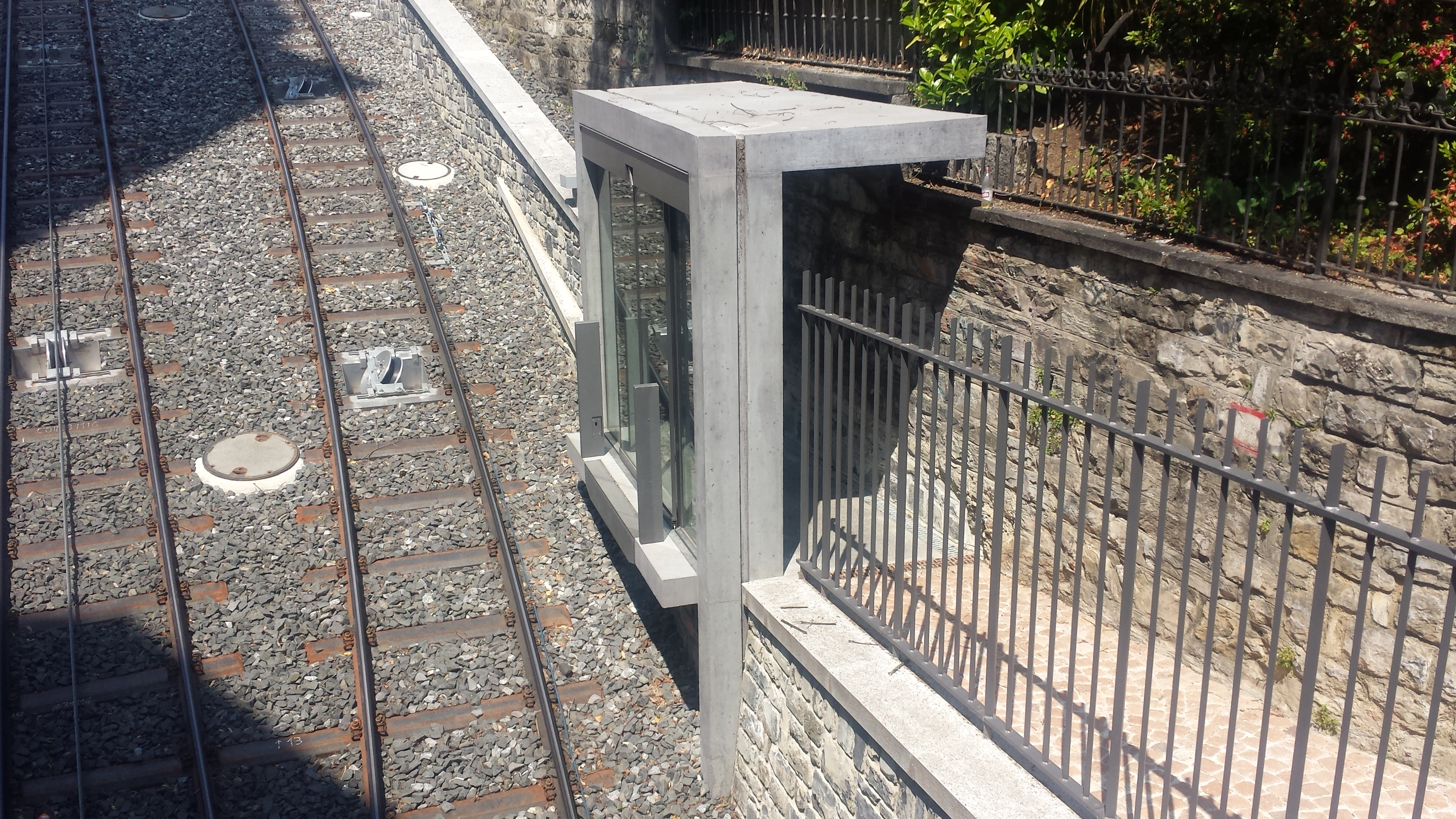
The intermediate Cattedrale stop in 2017

The Lugano Città–Stazione funicular, Funicolare Lugano Città–Stazione, or Sassellina, is a funicular railway in the city of Lugano in the Swiss canton of Ticino. The line's upper station is located within the main railway station of Lugano, and the lower station is on Piazza Cioccaro in the historic city centre below. It is one of the busiest funicular lines in Switzerland, carrying 2.4 million passengers in 2007.

The Lugano Città–Stazione funicular is one of three funiculars within the Lugano area. The other two are the Monte Brè funicular, which ascends Monte Brè, and the Monte San Salvatore funicular, which ascends Monte San Salvatore.

== History ==
The line was built in 1886, and was originally water powered. In its first year of operation, the funicular carried 118,884 passengers, taking 3 minutes for the total journey and carrying 40 passengers in each car.

The line was completely renovated and electrified in 1955, and overhauled in 1988. By 2014, the funicular was carrying approximately 2.5 million passengers per year and was considered overloaded.

A further major renovation took place between 2014 and 2016, intended to increase the capacity of the line by 20%. In order to facilitate this renovation, the line closed in July 2014, and was reopened on 11 December 2016. Two new cars, accommodating 100 passengers each, were built by Garaventa and CWA Constructions Olten. The reconstruction also involved a redesign of the interface between the funicular and railway station, with the funicular terminating in a new lower level foyer at pedestrian subway level. As a consequence the line was shortened from 220 metres (722 ft) to 206 metres (676 ft), and the vertical distance travelled reduced from 53 metres (174 ft) to 50 metres (160 ft).

During the opening ceremony, the funicular was named the Sassellina. The name, decided by a contest sponsored by TPL, recalls an old district of Lugano that has now disappeared but was next to the funicular.

== Route ==
The line departs from its own platforms, situated in a new station atrium and below the station forecourt, at approximately right-angles to the main line platforms of Lugano railway station. The atrium is level with, and connected to, the pedestrian subway that links to all the main line platforms.

On leaving the station the line passes through a tunnel, before emerging into the open air to cross the Via degli Amadio on a bridge. It then enters a passing loop, which is situated alongside the Cathedral of Saint Lawrence. The intermediate request stop Cattedrale is situated at the loop. Below the passing loop, the line again descends into a tunnel, before emerging into the courtyard of the Acquarello Hotel and terminating on Piazza Cioccaro in the city centre.

== Operation ==
The line is operated by the Trasporti Pubblici Luganesi (TPL), who also operate the city's bus network. The line runs continuously from 05:00 to midnight, seven days a week.

The funicular has the following characteristics:

Feature	Value
Number of stops	3 (2 terminal, 1 intermediate)
Configuration	Single track with passing loop
Mode of operation	Automatic
Track length	206 metres (676 ft)
Rise	50 metres (160 ft)
Maximum gradient	25.3%
Tunnels	46 metres (151 ft) + 47 metres (154 ft)
Track gauge	1,000 mm (3 ft 3 3/8 in) metre gauge
Number of cars	2
Capacity	100 passengers per car
Maximum speed	3 metres per second (9.8 ft/s)
Travel time	1.5 minutes

Both terminal stations have platforms on both sides, one used by boarding passengers and the other by alighting passengers. The intermediate request stop at Cattedrale is unusual, as its single short platform is situated alongside the northern track of the passing loop, and can thus only be served by alternate services in each direction. A stop is requested by buttons at the stop and in car 2, the car which always uses the northern side of the loop, and only a single door is opened at this stop. All platforms are equipped with platform doors, which open in synchronisation with the car doors.

== See also ==
- List of funicular railways
- List of funiculars in Switzerland
