= Sant'Antonio Abate, Lugano =

Church in Lugano, Switzerland

Coordinates: 46.0050°N 8.9514°E

Sant'Antonio Abate is a Roman Catholic church facing Piazza Dante in the city center of Lugano, Switzerland, and dedicated to Anthony the Great.

Construction for the building started in 1633 and continued throughout the centuries.

The rich stucco decoration of the interior was executed in 1652 by Luca Corbellini and G. B. Bellotto, and was continued in 1683 by G. Rossi.

Italian poet Alessandro Manzoni studied there between 1796 and 1798.

== Gallery ==
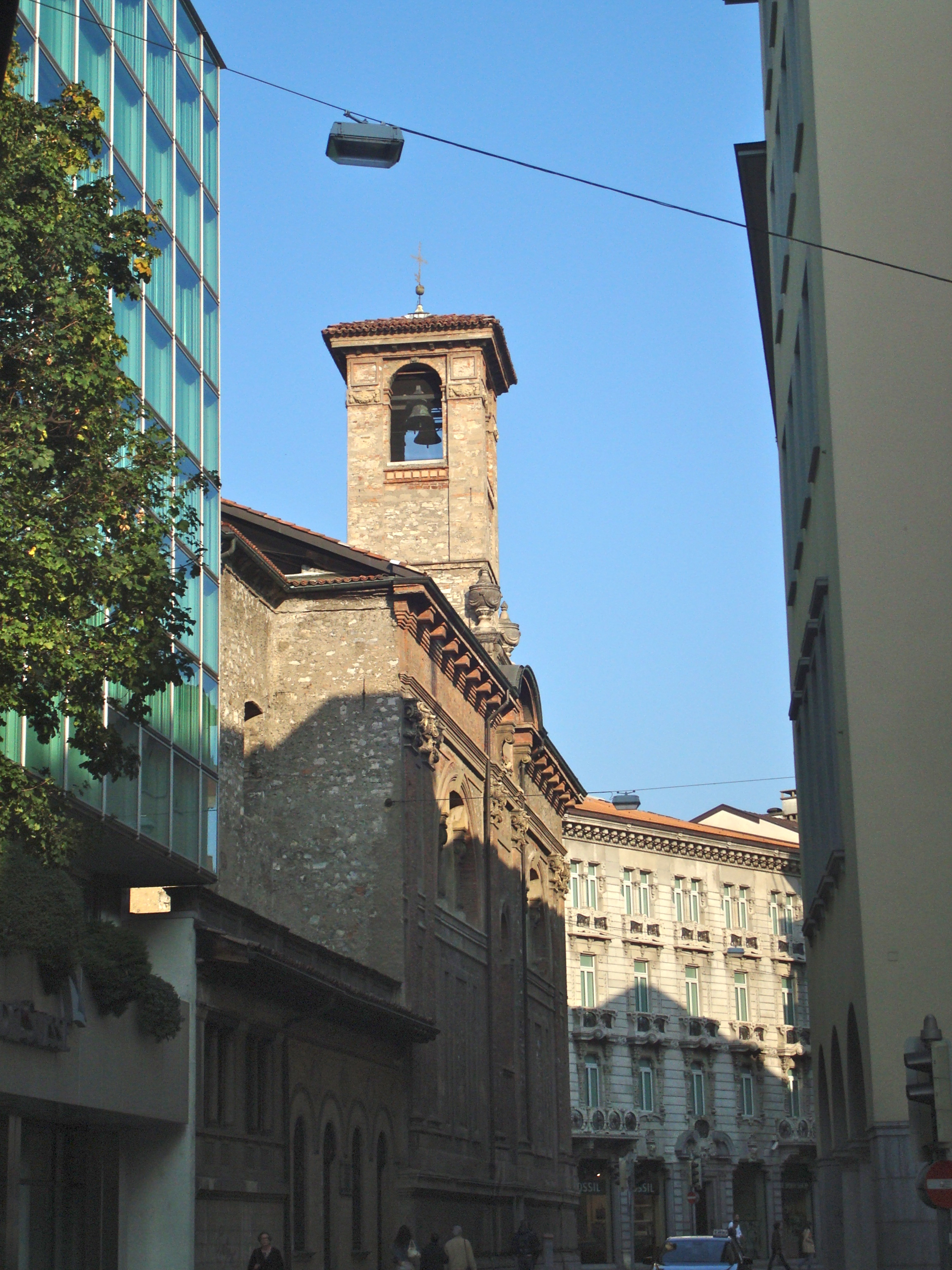
View of the facade along via Magatti

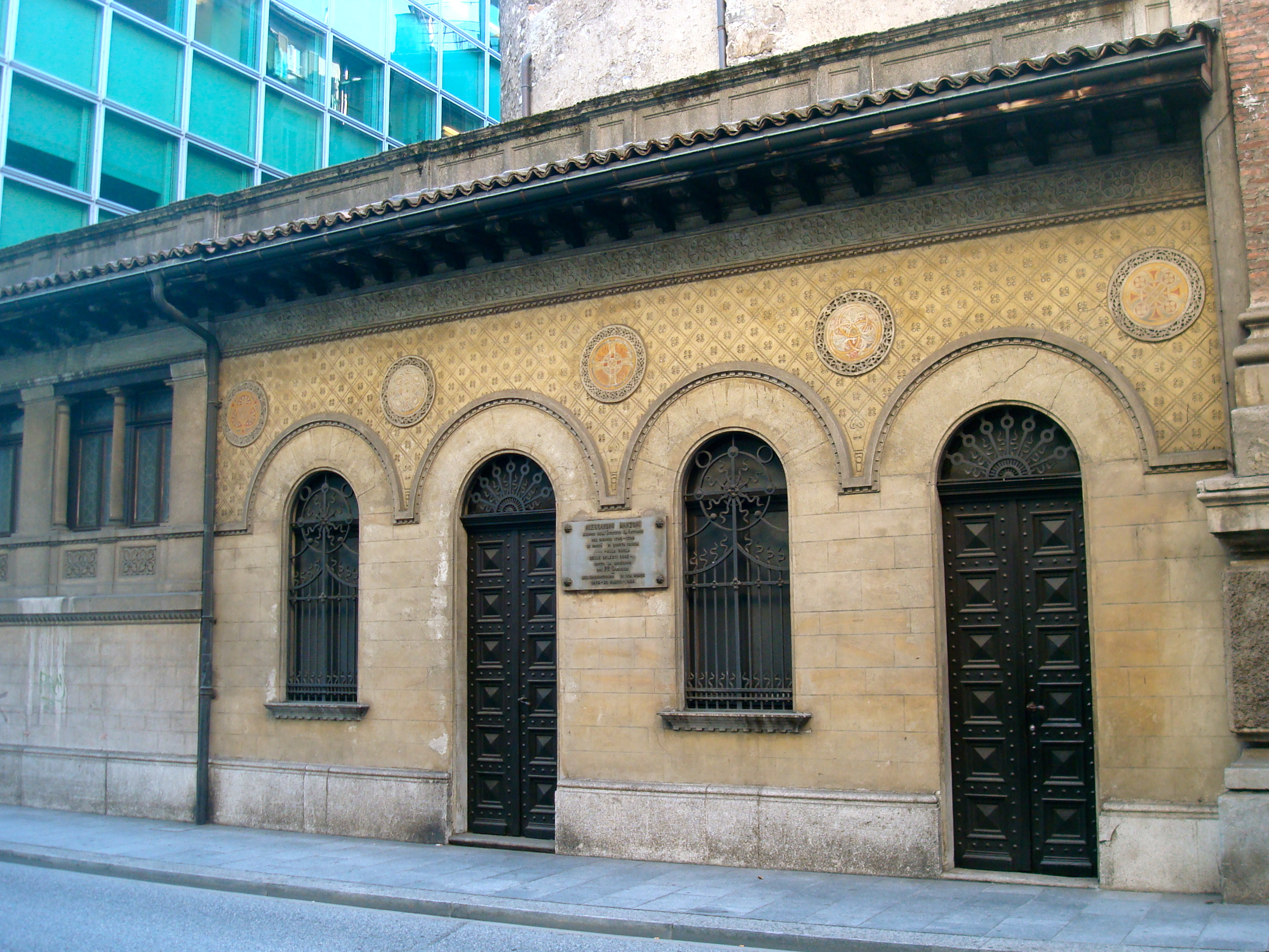
View of the access on Via Magatti, with a plaque dedicated to Alessandro Manzoni

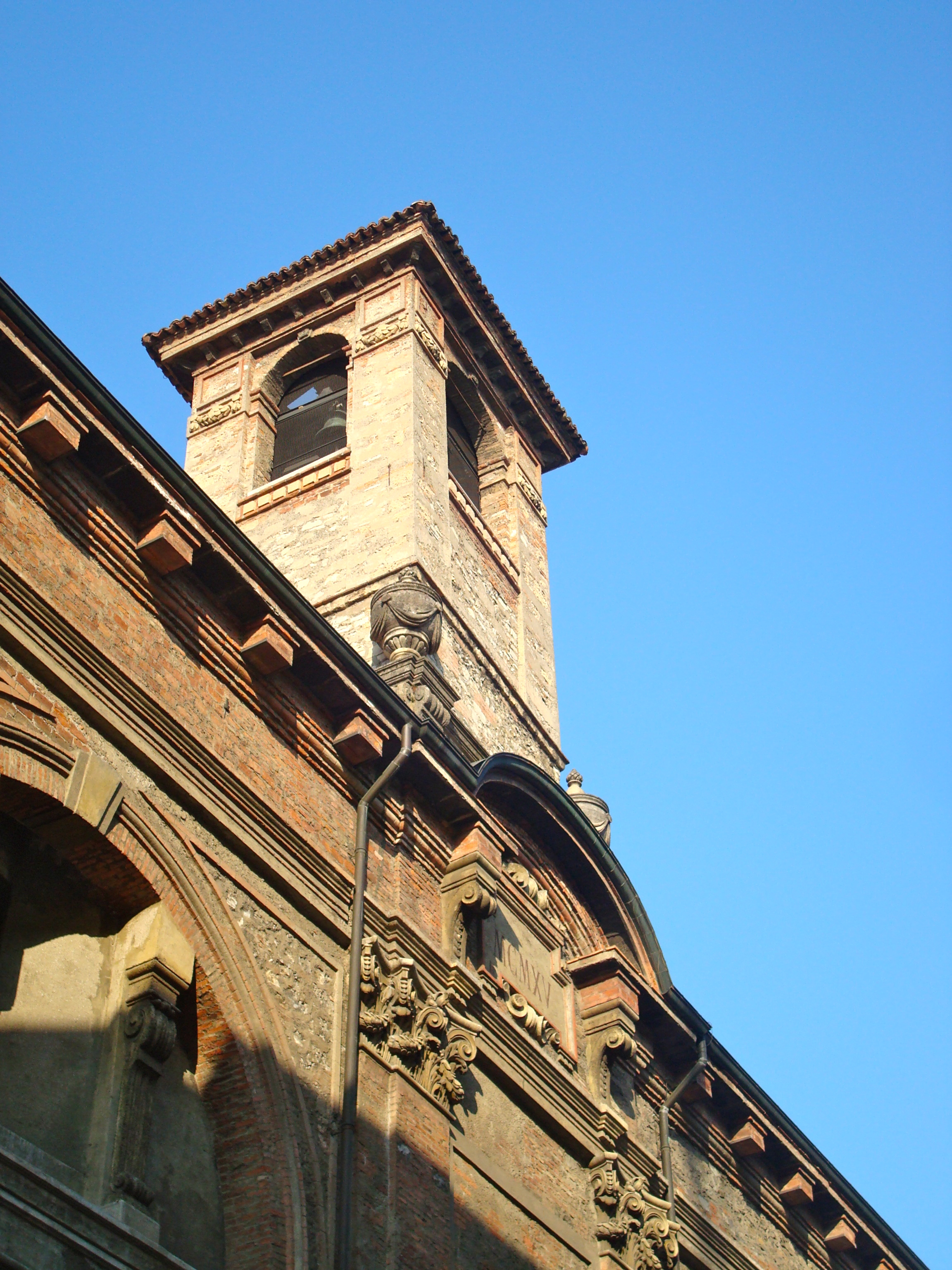
Detail of the bell tower as seen from Via Magatti

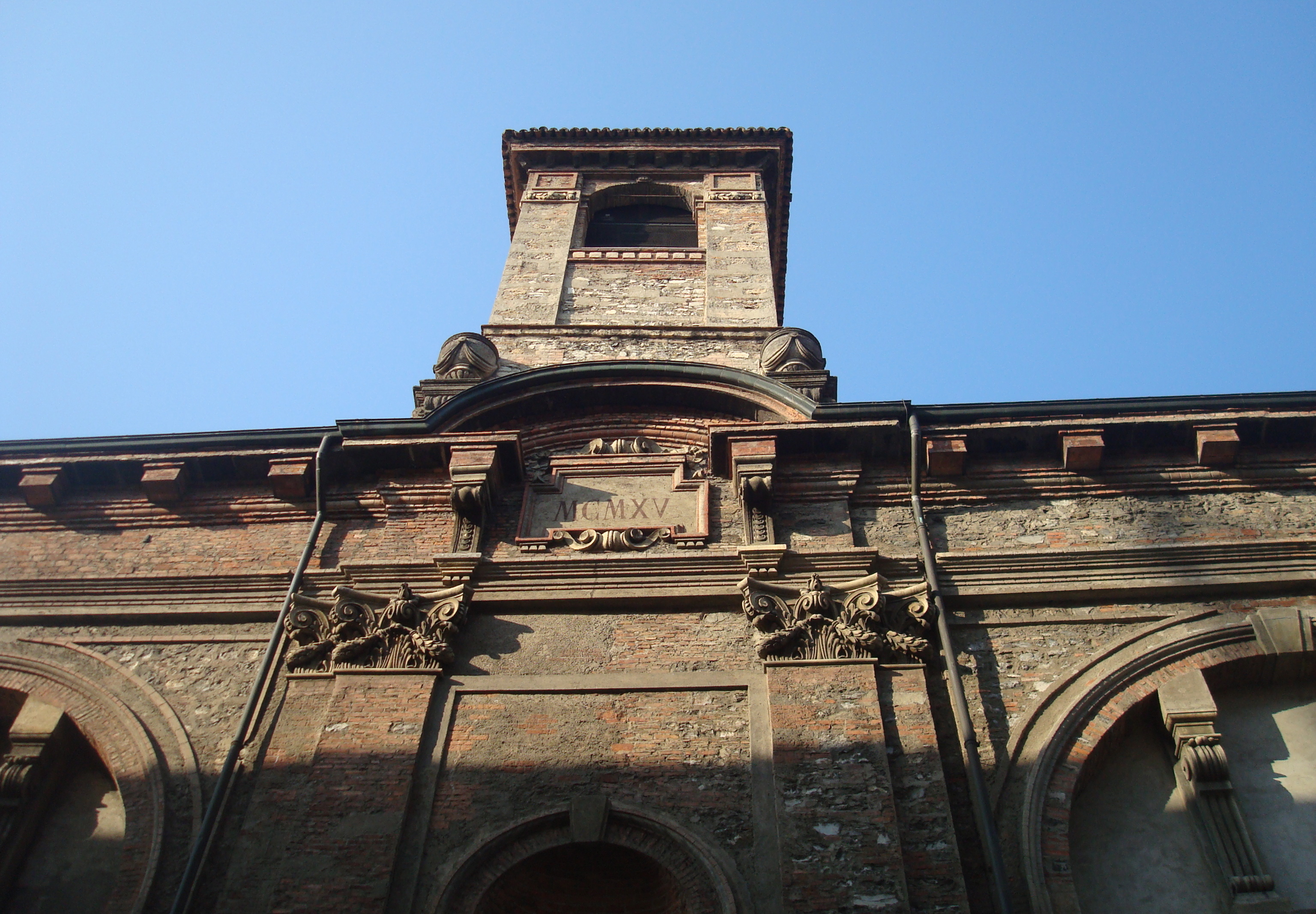
Detail of the bell tower as seen from Via Magatti

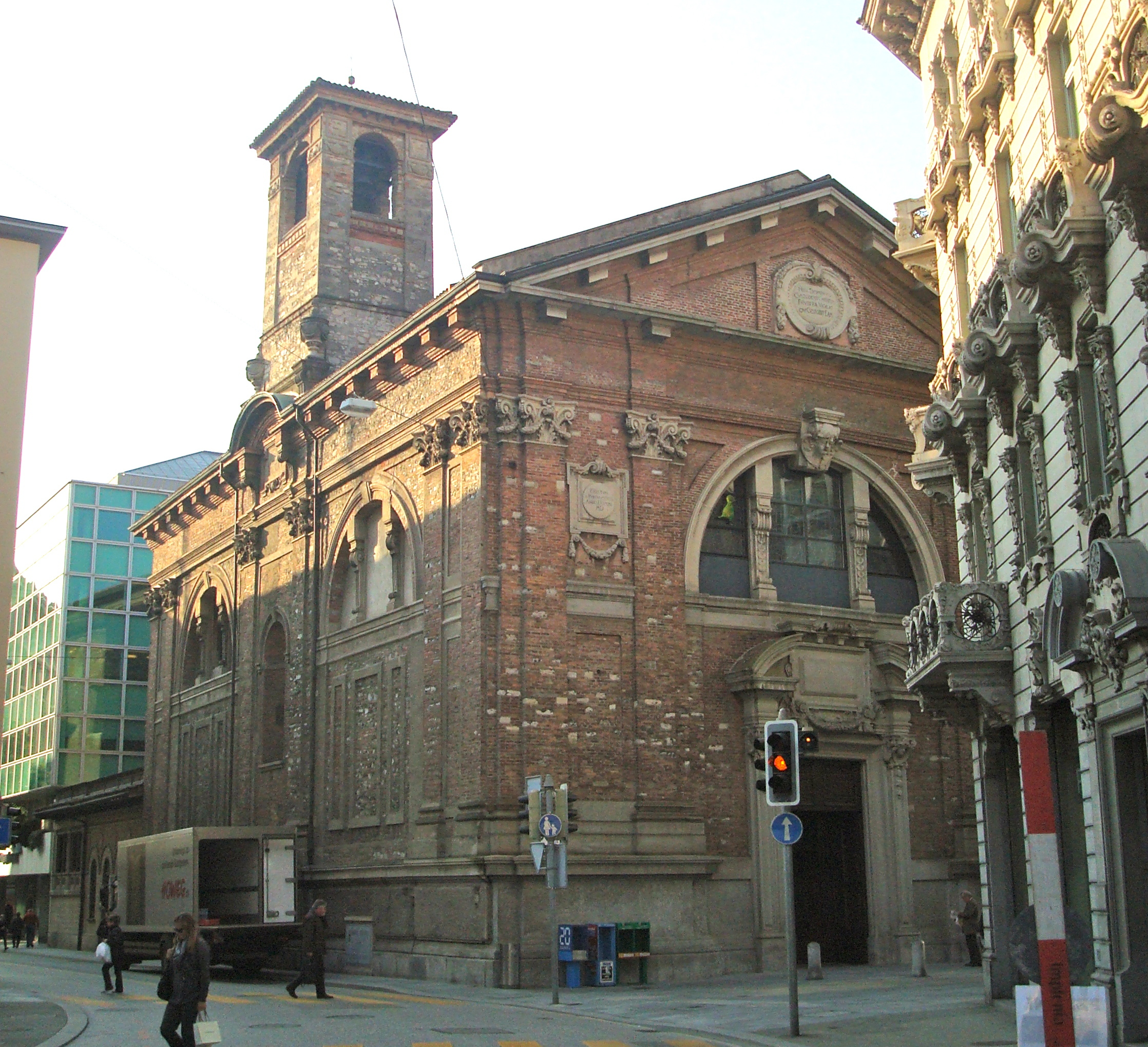
View of the corner between Piazza Dante, via Pretorio, and Via Magatti

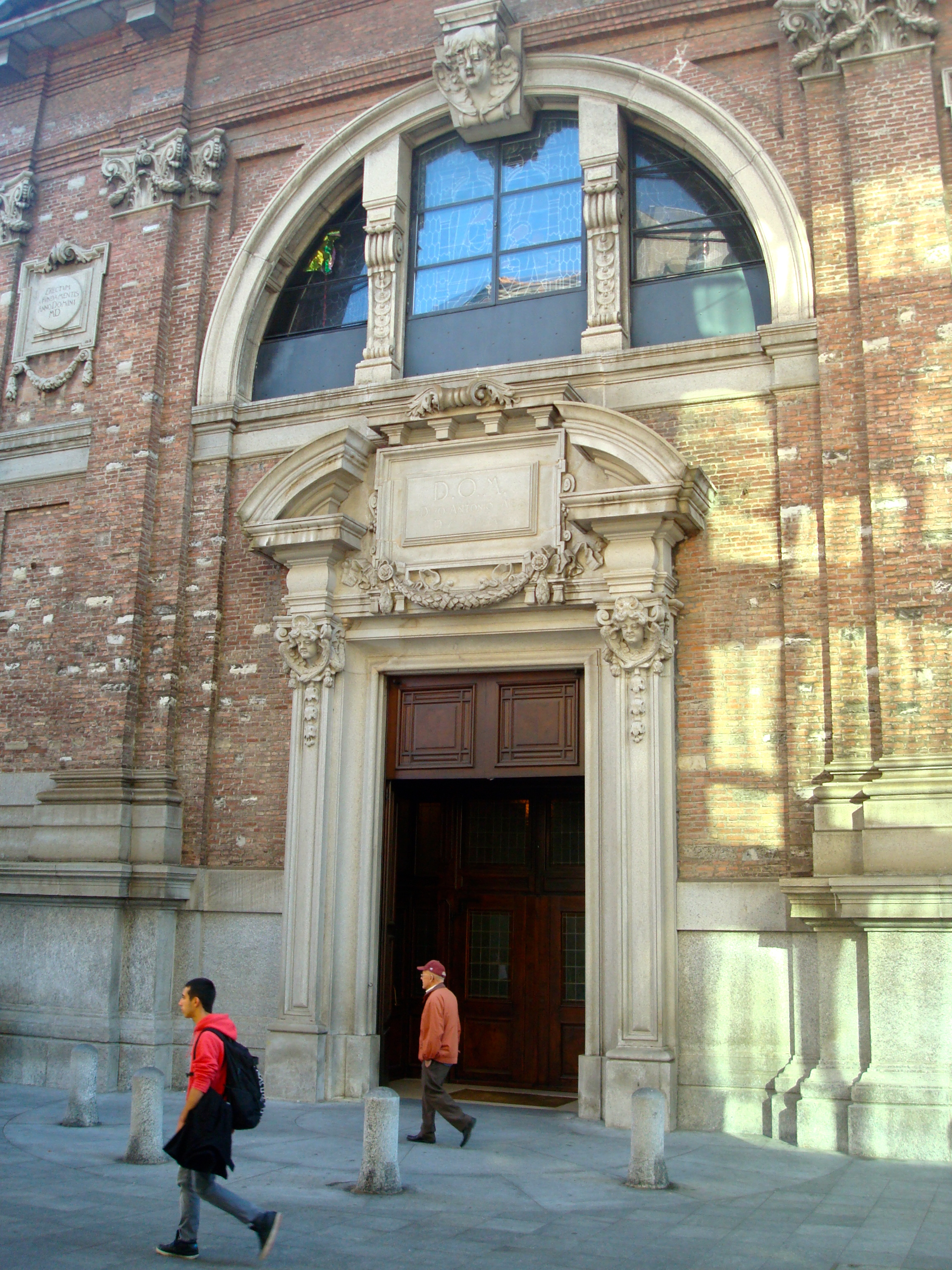
Detail of the main facade on Piazza Dante

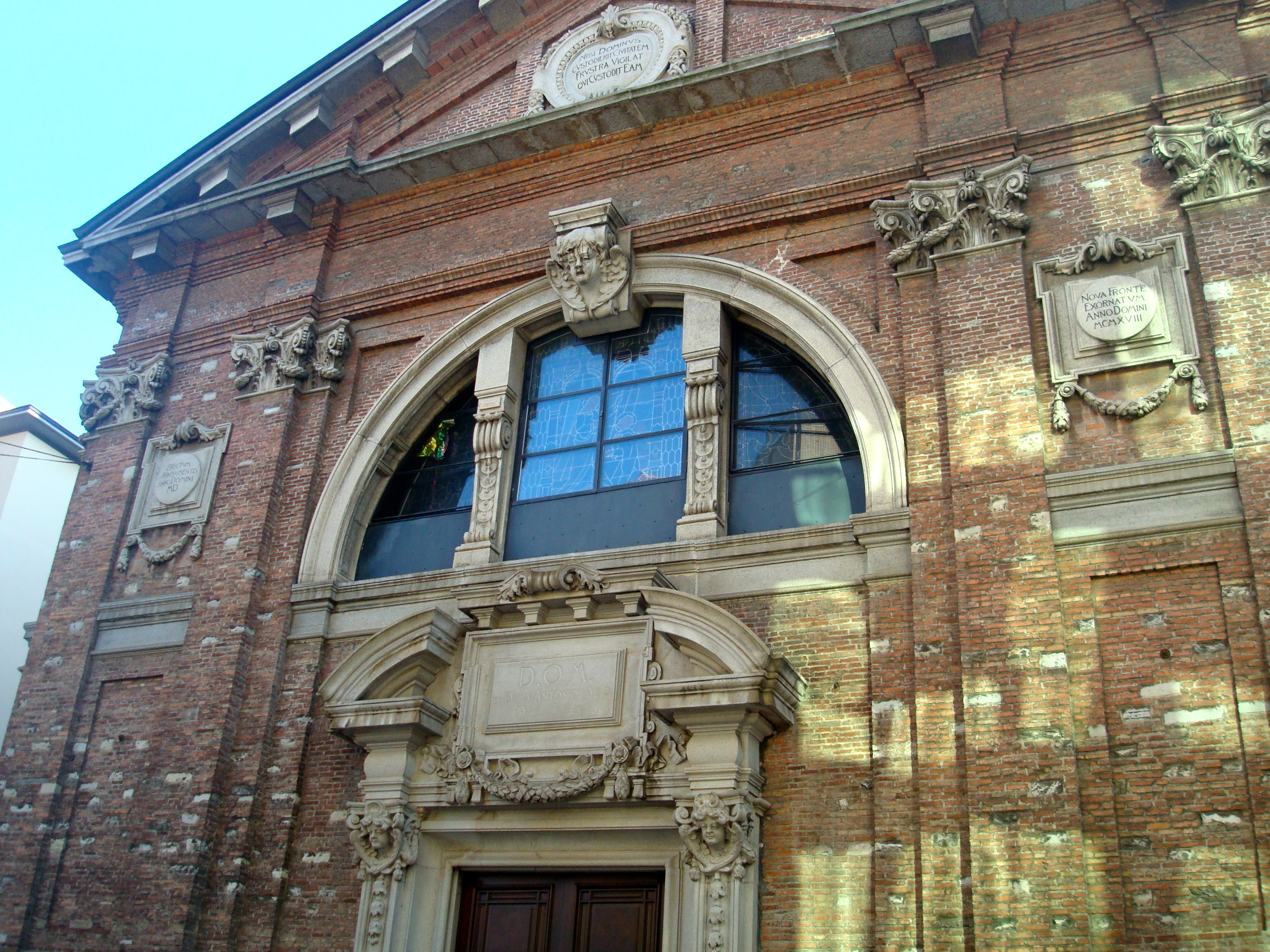
Detail of the main facade on Piazza Dante

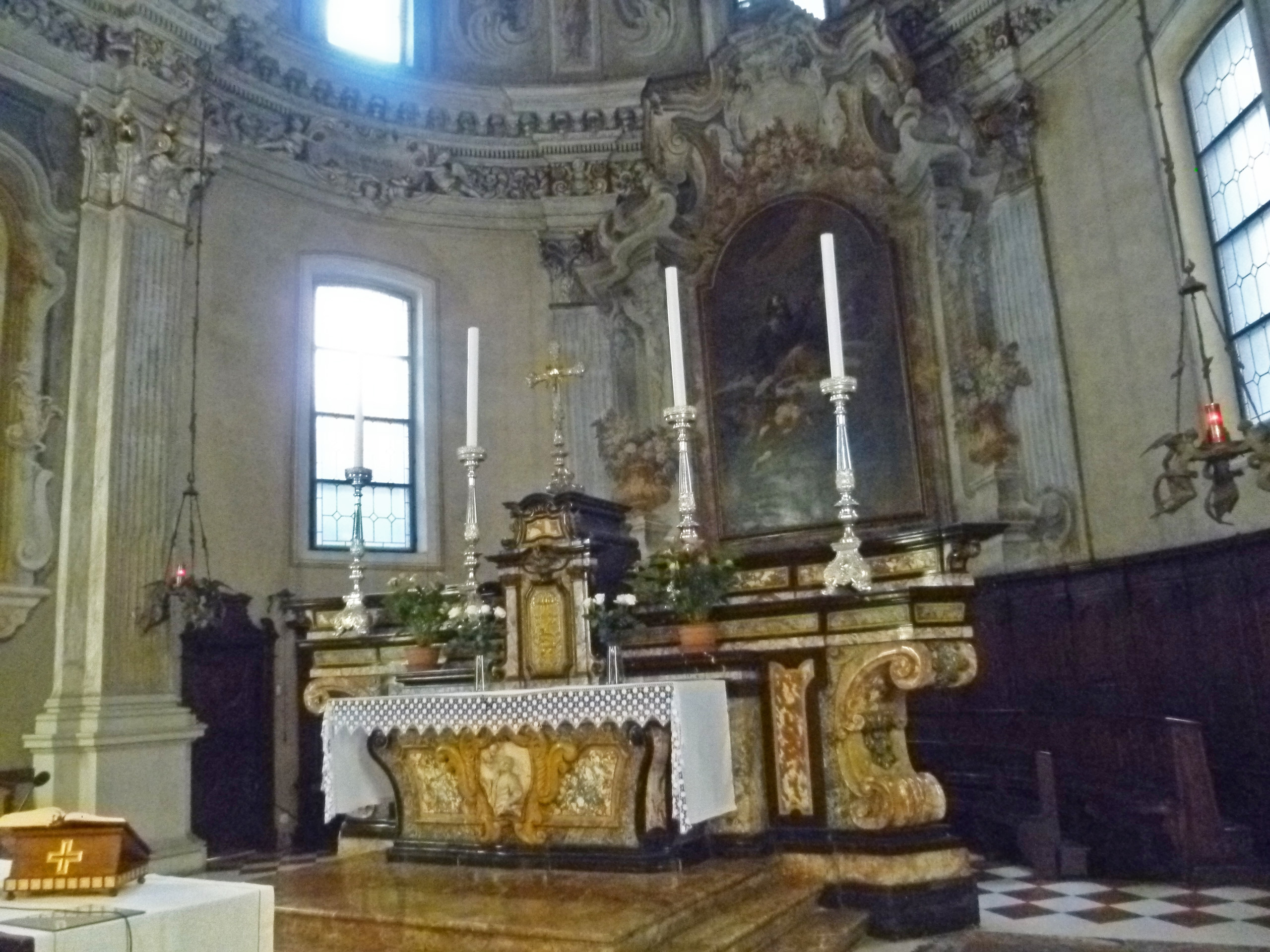
View of the main altar

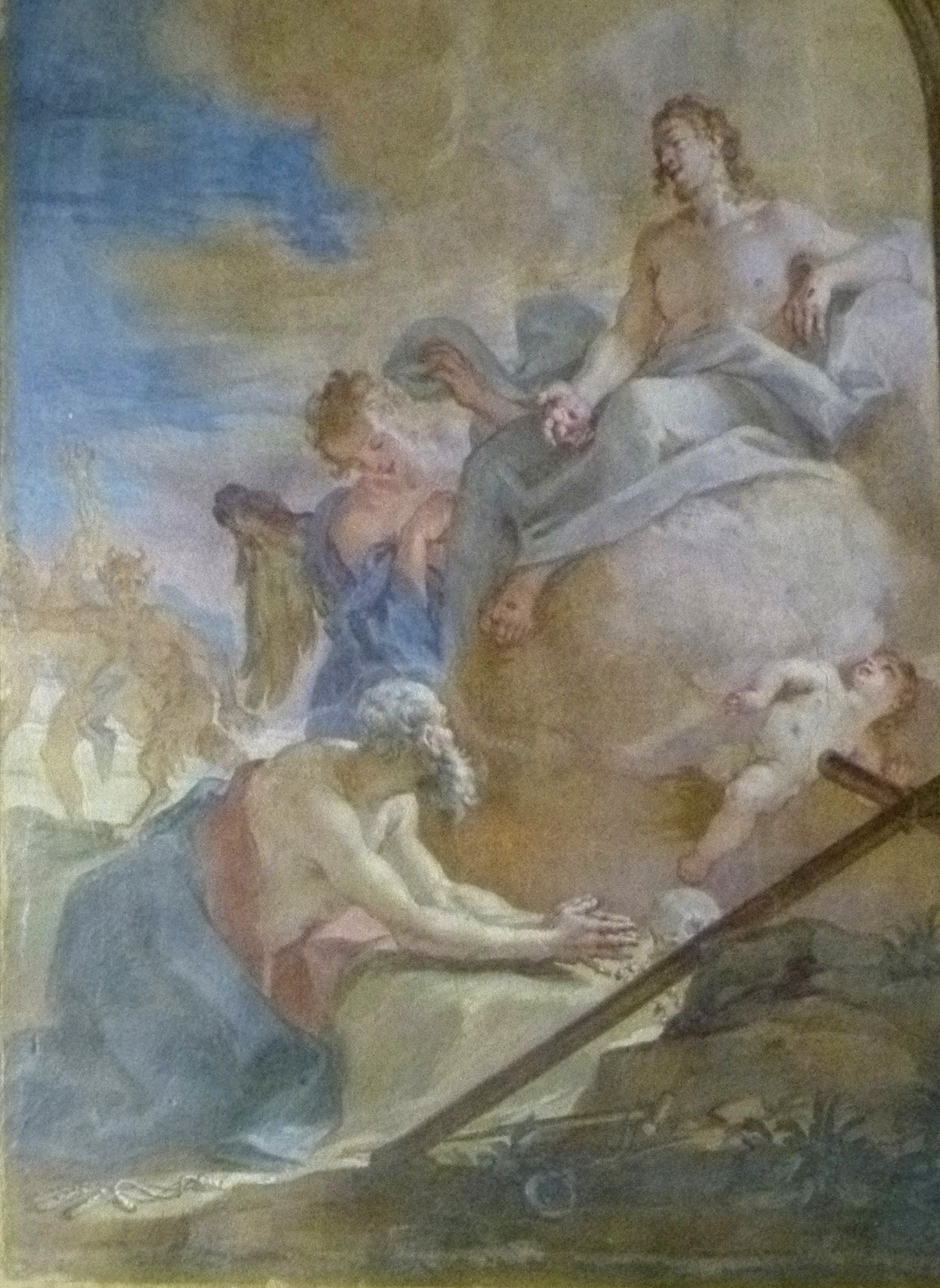
View of an artwork in the interior
