= Jeux sans frontières season 16 =

Jeux sans frontières
- Season 16
- No. of teams: 8 countries
- Winner: (Portugal) Vilamoura
- Runner-up: (United Kingdom) Rhuddlan
- Head referees: Gennaro Olivieri; Guido Pancaldi
- No. of episodes: 9

Release
- Original release: 21 May – 10 September 1980

Season chronology
- ← Previous; Season 15 Next → Season 17

The 16th season of the international television game show Jeux sans frontières was held in the summer of 1980. Broadcasters from Belgium, France, Italy, Portugal, Switzerland, the United Kingdom, West Germany, and Yugoslavia participated in the competition coordinated by the European Broadcasting Union (EBU). The different heats were hosted by each of the participant broadcasters in locations in their countries such as Antibes (France), Vilamoura (Portugal), Portorož (Yugoslavia), Fribourg (Switzerland), Martina Franca (Italy), Arundel (United Kingdom), Diest (Belgium), and Coburg (West Germany). The grand final was held in Namur (Belgium). The head international referees in charge of supervising the competition were Gennaro Olivieri and Guido Pancaldi.

The season was won by the team from Vilamoura, Portugal, the runner-up being the team from Rhuddlan, United Kingdom.

== Participants ==
Country	Broadcaster	Code	Colour
Belgium	RTBF / BRT	B	Yellow
France	Antenne 2	F	Green
Italy	RAI	I	Blue
Portugal	RTP	P	Orange
Switzerland	SRG SSR TSI	CH	White and red
United Kingdom	BBC	GB	Red
West Germany	ARD	D	Light blue
Yugoslavia	JRT	YU	White and blue

== Heats ==
=== Heat 1 ===
Heat 1 was hosted by Antenne 2 on 21 May 1980 in Antibes, France, presented by Guy Lux and Simone Garnier.

Place	Country	Town	Points
1	CH	Bülach	51
2	D	Bellheim	50
3	F	Antibes	44
4	GB	Rushcliffe	41
5	I	Virgilio	38
6	B	Waremme	29
7	P	Póvoa de Varzim	22
8	YU	Titov Veles	19

=== Heat 2 ===
Heat 2 was hosted by RTP on 27 May 1980 in Vilamoura, Portugal, presented by Eládio Clímaco and Fialho Gouveia.

Place	Country	Town	Points
1	D	Todtnau	44
2	GB	Rhuddlan	40
2	P	Vilamoura	40
4	I	Teramo	38
5	CH	Cernier	33
5	YU	Kikinda	33
7	B	Marche-en-Famenne	32
8	F	Perigueux	31

=== Heat 3 ===
Heat 3 was hosted by TV Belgrade on behalf of JRT on 10 June 1980 in Portorož, Yugoslavia, hosted by Dunja Lango, Mito Trefalt and Bruna Alessio.

Place	Country	Town	Points
1	YU	Portorož	46
2	F	Châteauroux	41
3	GB	Kettering	39
3	B	De Haan-Wenduine	39
5	CH	Agno	37
6	D	Bad Wurzach	32
7	P	Coimbra	29
8	I	Anagni	25

=== Heat 4 ===
Heat 4 was hosted by TSR on behalf of SRG SSR TSI on 25 June 1980 in Fribourg, Switzerland, presented by Georges Kleinmann.

Place	Country	Town	Points
1	B	Charleroi	43
2	I	Grado	41
3	CH	Fribourg	40
4	GB	Coleraine	33
5	D	Groß-Zimmern	32
6	YU	Varaždin	31
7	F	Troyes	31
8	P	Lousã	26

=== Heat 5 ===
Heat 5 was hosted by RAI on 9 July 1980 in Martina Franca, Italy, presented by Michele Gammino and Milly Carlucci.

Place	Country	Town	Points
1	B	Merksem	54
2	I	Martina Franca	44
3	YU	Budva	41
4	CH	Lodrino	32
5	D	Willingen	31
5	F	Rumilly	31
7	GB	Bridlington	30
7	P	Santarém	20

=== Heat 6 ===
Heat 6 was hosted by the BBC on 23 July 1980 in Arundel, United Kingdom, presented by Stuart Hall and Eddie Waring.

Place	Country	Town	Points
1	CH	Meiringen-Hasliberg	55
2	F	Aurignac	44
3	D	Groß-Umstadt	39
4	I	Monreale	38
5	GB	Arundel	37
6	B	Saint-Ghislain	34
7	P	Machico	27
7	YU	Tuzla	27

=== Heat 7 ===
Heat 7 was hosted by BRT on 27 August 1980 in Diest, Belgium, presented by Mike Verdrengh and Linda Lepomme.

Place	Country	Town	Points
1	CH	Airolo	53
2	D	Baunatal	45
3	YU	Kraljevo	44
4	B	Diest	41
5	GB	Bracknell	36
6	F	Coutances	34
7	I	Cortona	29
7	P	Figueira da Foz	22

=== Heat 8 ===
Heat 8 was hosted by ARD on 3 September 1980 in Coburg, Germany, presented by Manfred Erdenberger.

Place	Country	Town	Points
1	F	Annecy	48
2	D	Coburg	42
3	YU	Pristina	41
4	GB	Gateshead	39
5	B	Sint-Genesius-Rode	32
6	P	Angra do Heroísmo	31
7	I	Orvieto	30
7	CH	Braunwald	30

=== Qualifiers ===
The teams with the most points from each country advanced to the grand final:

Country	Town	Place won	Points won
CH	Meiringen-Hasliberg	1	55
B	Merksem	1	54
F	Annecy	1	48
YU	Portorož	1	46
D	Todtnau	1	44
I	Martina Franca	2	44
GB	Rhuddlan	2	40
P	Vilamoura	2	40

== Final ==
The final was hosted by RTBF on 10 September 1980 in Namur, Belgium.

Place	Country	Town	Points
1	P	Vilamoura	44
2	GB	Rhuddlan	41
3	B	Merksem	39
4	D	Todtnau	37
5	F	Annecy	36
6	CH	Meiringen-Hasliberg	34
7	YU	Portorož	32
8	I	Martina Franca	29
