= Jeux sans frontières season 17 =

Jeux sans frontières
- Season 17
- No. of teams: 7 countries
- Winners: (Portugal) Lisbon (United Kingdom) Dartmouth
- Head referees: Gennaro Olivieri; Guido Pancaldi
- No. of episodes: 8

Release
- Original network: RTBF1; TV1; Antenne 2; Rete 2; RTP1; TV DRS; TSR; TSI; BBC1; TV Belgrade 1; TV Zagreb 1
- Original release: 26 May – 8 September 1981

Season chronology
- ← Previous; Season 16 Next → Season 18

The 17th season of the international television game show Jeux sans frontières was held in the summer of 1981. Broadcasters from Belgium, France, Italy, Portugal, Switzerland, the United Kingdom, and Yugoslavia participated in the competition coordinated by the European Broadcasting Union (EBU), while West Germany withdrew due to low viewing figures. The different heats were hosted by each of the participant broadcasters in locations in their countries such as Lignano Sabbiadoro (Italy), Pula (Yugoslavia), Annecy (France), Meiringen-Hasliberg (Switzerland), Lisbon (Portugal), Sunderland (United Kingdom), and Charleroi (Belgium). The grand final was held in Belgrade (Yugoslavia). The head international referees in charge of supervising the competition were Gennaro Olivieri and Guido Pancaldi.

For each heat, each broadcaster sent a mixed team from a city or town from its country that competed against each other in a series of physical games played in outlandish costumes themed in the specific topic of the episode. After the seven heats, the most successful team from each country competed in the grand final. Each of the episodes was presented by the host broadcaster in its own language. Each of the participating broadcasters had their own presenters who did some on-site presentations for their audience and commented on the competition in their language.

The season was won by the teams from Lisbon, Portugal, and Dartmouth, United Kingdom.

== Participants ==
Country	Broadcaster	Code	Colour	Cities
Belgium	RTBF / BRT	B	Yellow	Torhout
Belgium	RTBF / BRT	B	Yellow	Molenbeek-Saint-Jean
Belgium	RTBF / BRT	B	Yellow	Herent
Belgium	RTBF / BRT	B	Yellow	Charleroi
Belgium	RTBF / BRT	B	Yellow	Bornem
Belgium	RTBF / BRT	B	Yellow	Lessines
Belgium	RTBF / BRT	B	Yellow	Evergem
France	Antenne 2	F	Green	Bitche en Moselle
France	Antenne 2	F	Green	Argentan
France	Antenne 2	F	Green	Digne-les-Bains
France	Antenne 2	F	Green	Les Gets
France	Antenne 2	F	Green	Le Cannet
France	Antenne 2	F	Green	Annecy
France	Antenne 2	F	Green	Issy-les-Moulineaux
Italy	RAI	I	Blue	Lignano Sabbiadoro
Italy	RAI	I	Blue	San Felice Circeo
Italy	RAI	I	Blue	Montorio al Vomano
Italy	RAI	I	Blue	Finale Ligure
Italy	RAI	I	Blue	Merate
Italy	RAI	I	Blue	Agropoli
Italy	RAI	I	Blue	Senigallia
Portugal	RTP	P	Orange	(Azores) São Miguel
Portugal	RTP	P	Orange	Santarém
Portugal	RTP	P	Orange	Lisbon
Portugal	RTP	P	Orange	Madeira
Portugal	RTP	P	Orange	Braga
Portugal	RTP	P	Orange	Aveiro
Portugal	RTP	P	Orange	Algarve
Switzerland	SRG SSR TSI	CH	White and red	Regensdorf
Switzerland	SRG SSR TSI	CH	White and red	Saint-Légier
Switzerland	SRG SSR TSI	CH	White and red	Rancate
Switzerland	SRG SSR TSI	CH	White and red	Saas Fee
Switzerland	SRG SSR TSI	CH	White and red	Ittigen
Switzerland	SRG SSR TSI	CH	White and red	Intragna
Switzerland	SRG SSR TSI	CH	White and red	Les Bois
United Kingdom	BBC	GB	Red	Sherborne
United Kingdom	BBC	GB	Red	Kingston-upon-Hull
United Kingdom	BBC	GB	Red	Dartmouth
United Kingdom	BBC	GB	Red	Luton
United Kingdom	BBC	GB	Red	Dunfermline
United Kingdom	BBC	GB	Red	Warrington
United Kingdom	BBC	GB	Red	Sunderland
Yugoslavia	JRT	YU	White and blue	(Socialist Republic of Croatia) Šibenik
Yugoslavia	JRT	YU	White and blue	(Socialist Republic of Croatia) Pula
Yugoslavia	JRT	YU	White and blue	(Socialist Republic of Croatia) Osijek
Yugoslavia	JRT	YU	White and blue	(Socialist Republic of Bosnia and Herzegovina) Zenica
Yugoslavia	JRT	YU	White and blue	(Socialist Republic of Serbia) Pirot
Yugoslavia	JRT	YU	White and blue	(Socialist Republic of Serbia) Majdanpek
Yugoslavia	JRT	YU	White and blue	(Socialist Republic of Macedonia) Bitolj

== Season overview ==
Heat	Date	Host		Theme	Winner
Heat	Date	Broadcaster	City	Theme	Winner
1	26 May	RAI	(Italy) Lignano Sabbiadoro	"Water"	(Italy) Lignano Sabbiadoro
2	10 June	JRT (TV Belgrade)	(Socialist Federal Republic of Yugoslavia) (Socialist Republic of Croatia) Pula	"The Cinema"	(Socialist Federal Republic of Yugoslavia) (Socialist Republic of Croatia) Pula
3	24 June	RTP	(Portugal) Lisbon	"The Festival of Saint Anthony"	(Portugal) Lisbon
4	8 July	RTBF	(Belgium) Charleroi	"Professions"	(Italy) Finale Ligure
5	29 July	SRG SSR TSI (TV DRS)	(Switzerland) Meiringen-Hasliberg	"Mountain Holidays, Legends of the Swiss Alps"	(Switzerland) Ittigen
6	12 August	Antenne 2	(France) Annecy	"Games of the World"	(Belgium) Lessines
7	25 August	BBC	(United Kingdom) Sunderland	"A Country-House Weekend in the 1920s"	(France) Issy-les-Moulineaux; (Switzerland) Les Bois
IF	8 September	JRT (TV Belgrade)	(Socialist Federal Republic of Yugoslavia) (Socialist Republic of Serbia) Belgrade	"The Music, la Musique, die Musik... Long live the Music!"	(United Kingdom) Dartmouth; (Portugal) Lisbon

== Results ==
=== Heat 1 ===
Heat 1 was hosted by RAI on 26 May 1981 in Lignano Sabbiadoro, Italy, and its theme was the sea. It was presented by Michele Gammino and Milly Carlucci.

Place	Country	Town	Points
1	I	Lignano Sabbiadoro	46
2	CH	Regensdorf	41
3	YU	Šibenik	31
3	GB	Sherborne	31
5	B	Torhout	27
6	P	São Miguel	26
7	F	Bitche en Moselle	22

=== Heat 2 ===
Heat 2 was hosted by TV Belgrade on behalf of JRT on 10 June 1981 at the Roman amphitheatre in Pula, Yugoslavia, and its theme was cinema. It was presented by Dunja Lango, Minja Subota and Mersiha Čolaković.

Place	Country	Town	Points
1	YU	Pula	45
2	CH	Saint-Légier	44
3	F	Argentan	34
4	I	San Felice Circeo	31
5	GB	Kingston-upon-Hull	30
6	B	Molenbeek-Saint-Jean	25
7	P	Santarém	19

=== Heat 3 ===
Heat 3 was hosted by RTP on 24 June 1981 in front of the Belém Tower in Lisbon, Portugal, and its theme was the feast of Saint Anthony. It was presented by Eládio Clímaco and Alice Cruz.

Place	Country	Town	Points
1	P	Lisbon	48
2	GB	Dartmouth	39
3	F	Digne-les-Bains	37
4	B	Herent	34
5	I	Montorio al Vomano	32
6	CH	Rancate	25
7	YU	Osijek	24

=== Heat 4 ===
Heat 4 was hosted by RTBF on 8 July 1981 in Charleroi, Belgium, and its theme was professions. It was presented by Paule Herreman and Michel Lemaire.

Place	Country	Town	Points
1	I	Finale Ligure	43
2	YU	Zenica	37
3	F	Les Gets	36
4	B	Charleroi	32
4	CH	Saas Fee	32
6	P	Madeira	28
7	GB	Luton	21

=== Heat 5 ===
Heat 5 was hosted by TV DRS on behalf of SRG SSR TSI on 29 July 1981 in Meiringen-Hasliberg, Switzerland, and its theme was holidays in the mountains and legends of the Swiss Alps. It was presented by Jan Hiermeyer and Rosemarie Pfluger.

Place	Country	Town	Points
1	CH	Ittigen	40
2	F	Le Cannet	39
3	GB	Dunfermline	35
3	YU	Pirot	35
5	B	Bornem	31
6	I	Merate	30
7	P	Braga	19

=== Heat 6 ===
Heat 6 was hosted by Antenne 2 on 12 August 1981 in Annecy, France, and its theme was the sports in the town. It was presented by Guy Lux and Simone Garnier.

Place	Country	Town	Points
1	B	Lessines	45
2	CH	Intragna	43
3	F	Annecy	37
4	P	Aveiro	31
5	GB	Warrington	28
6	YU	Majdanpek	24
7	I	Agropoli	21

=== Heat 7 ===
Heat 7 was hosted by the BBC on 25 August 1981 in Sunderland, United Kingdom, and its theme was British weekend traditions. It was presented by Stuart Hall and Eddie Waring.

Place	Country	Town	Points
1	CH	Les Bois	38
1	F	Issy-les-Moulineaux	38
3	B	Evergem	36
4	YU	Bitolj	33
5	I	Senigallia	30
6	GB	Sunderland	28
6	P	Algarve	28

=== Qualifiers ===
The teams with the most points from each country advanced to the grand final:

Country	Town	Place won	Points won
P	Lisbon	1	48
I	Lignano Sabbiadoro	1	46
B	Lessines	1	45
YU	Pula	1	45
CH	Ittigen	1	40
F	Issy-les-Moulineaux	1	38
GB	Dartmouth	2	39

== Final ==
The final was hosted by TV Belgrade on behalf of JRT on 8 September 1981 at the swimming pool complex of the Tašmajdan Sports and Recreation Center in Belgrade, Yugoslavia, and its theme was music. It was presented by Dunja Lango, Mersiha Čolaković and Minja Subota.

Place	Country	Town	Points
1	P	Lisbon	38
1	GB	Dartmouth	38
3	YU	Pula	36
4	I	Lignano Sabbiadoro	33
5	CH	Ittigen	26
6	F	Issy-les-Moulineaux	24
7	B	Lessines	19

== Broadcasts ==
The competition was transmitted to the participating broadcasters via the Eurovision network. In most cases, broadcasters aired the episodes live in their territory.

Country	Broadcaster(s)	Channel(s)	Presenter(s)/Commentator(s)	Ref.
Belgium	RTBF	RTBF1	Paule Herreman	,
Belgium	BRT	TV1	Mike Verdrengh	,
France	Antenne 2		Simone Garnier; Guy Lux; Claude Savarit	,
Italy	RAI	Rete 2	Michele Gammino	,
Portugal	RTP	RTP1	Eládio Clímaco; Alice Cruz	,
Switzerland	SRG SSR TSI	TSR	Jacques Deschenaux; Georges Kleinmann	,
Switzerland	SRG SSR TSI	TV DRS	Jan Hiermeyer	,
Switzerland	SRG SSR TSI	TSI	Mascia Cantoni; Ezio Guidi	,
United Kingdom	BBC	BBC1	Stuart Hall	,
Yugoslavia	JRT	TV Belgrade 1, TV Zagreb 1, TV Sarajevo 1	Minja Subota	,
Yugoslavia	JRT	TV Ljubljana 2	Borut Mencinger	,
Yugoslavia	JRT	TV Pristina	Osman Gashi	,
