= Jeux sans frontières season 18 =

Jeux sans frontières
- Season 18
- No. of teams: 7 countries
- Winner: (Belgium) Rochefort
- Runner-up: (Switzerland) Versoix
- Head referees: Gennaro Olivieri; Guido Pancaldi
- No. of episodes: 8

Release
- Original network: RTBF1; TV1; Antenne 2; Rete 2; RTP1; TV DRS; TSR; TSI; BBC1; TV Belgrade 1; TV Zagreb 1
- Original release: 25 May – 7 September 1982

Season chronology
- ← Previous; Season 17 Next → Season 19

The 18th season of the international television game show Jeux sans frontières was held in the summer of 1982. Broadcasters from Belgium, France, Italy, Portugal, Switzerland, the United Kingdom, and Yugoslavia participated in the competition coordinated by the European Broadcasting Union (EBU). The different heats were hosted by each of the participant broadcasters in locations in their countries such as La Maddalena (Italy), Šibenik (Yugoslavia), Issy-les-Moulineaux (France), Tesserete (Switzerland), Funchal (Portugal), Sherborne (United Kingdom), and Ghent (Belgium). The grand final was held in Urbino (Italy). The head international referees in charge of supervising the competition were Gennaro Olivieri and Guido Pancaldi.

For each heat, each broadcaster sent a mixed team of twelve members (six men and six women) from a city or town from its country that competed against each other in a series of games –physical games played in costumes, though technically difficult– related to the specific theme of the heat. After the seven heats, the most successful team from each country competed in the grand final. Each of the episodes was presented by the host broadcaster in its own language. Each of the participating broadcasters had their own presenters who did some on-site presentations for their audience and commented on the competition in their language.

The season was won by the team from Rochefort, Belgium, the runner-up being the team from Versoix, Switzerland.

== Participants ==
Country	Broadcaster	Code	Colour	Cities
Belgium	RTBF / BRT	B	Yellow	Jette
Belgium	RTBF / BRT	B	Yellow	Wielsbeke
Belgium	RTBF / BRT	B	Yellow	Spa
Belgium	RTBF / BRT	B	Yellow	Turnhout
Belgium	RTBF / BRT	B	Yellow	Rochefort
Belgium	RTBF / BRT	B	Yellow	Frameries
Belgium	RTBF / BRT	B	Yellow	Ghent
France	Antenne 2	F	Green	(Centre-Val de Loire) Sancerre
France	Antenne 2	F	Green	(Midi-Pyrénées) Foix
France	Antenne 2	F	Green	(Île-de-France) Issy-les-Moulineaux
France	Antenne 2	F	Green	(Centre-Val de Loire) Vendôme
France	Antenne 2	F	Green	(Languedoc-Roussillon) Lodève
France	Antenne 2	F	Green	(Upper Normandy) Dieppe
France	Antenne 2	F	Green	(Provence-Alpes-Côte d'Azur) Le Cannet
Italy	RAI	I	Blue	(Sardinia) La Maddalena
Italy	RAI	I	Blue	San Benedetto del Tronto
Italy	RAI	I	Blue	Lanuvio
Italy	RAI	I	Blue	Garda
Italy	RAI	I	Blue	Recoaro Terme
Italy	RAI	I	Blue	Lizzano
Italy	RAI	I	Blue	Maratea
Portugal	RTP	P	Orange	Tomar
Portugal	RTP	P	Orange	Azores
Portugal	RTP	P	Orange	Algarve
Portugal	RTP	P	Orange	Caldas da Rainha
Portugal	RTP	P	Orange	Madeira
Portugal	RTP	P	Orange	Mateus (Vila Real)
Portugal	RTP	P	Orange	Viseu
Switzerland	SRG SSR TSI	CH	White and red	Gordola
Switzerland	SRG SSR TSI	CH	White and red	Vallée de Joux
Switzerland	SRG SSR TSI	CH	White and red	Romanshorn
Switzerland	SRG SSR TSI	CH	White and red	Tesserete
Switzerland	SRG SSR TSI	CH	White and red	Schinznach-Bad
Switzerland	SRG SSR TSI	CH	White and red	Versoix
Switzerland	SRG SSR TSI	CH	White and red	Plaffeien
United Kingdom	BBC	GB	Red	Charnwood
United Kingdom	BBC	GB	Red	Keswick
United Kingdom	BBC	GB	Red	Christchurch
United Kingdom	BBC	GB	Red	Lochgilphead
United Kingdom	BBC	GB	Red	Rotherham
United Kingdom	BBC	GB	Red	West Dorset
United Kingdom	BBC	GB	Red	Charnwood
Yugoslavia	JRT	YU	White and blue	(Socialist Republic of Croatia) Zadar
Yugoslavia	JRT	YU	White and blue	(Socialist Republic of Croatia) Šibenik
Yugoslavia	JRT	YU	White and blue	(Socialist Republic of Serbia) Čačak
Yugoslavia	JRT	YU	White and blue	(Socialist Republic of Croatia) Umag
Yugoslavia	JRT	YU	White and blue	(Socialist Republic of Serbia) Novi Sad
Yugoslavia	JRT	YU	White and blue	(Socialist Republic of Montenegro) Ulcinj
Yugoslavia	JRT	YU	White and blue	(Socialist Republic of Bosnia and Herzegovina) Jajce

== Season overview ==
Heat	Date	Host		Theme	Winner
Heat	Date	Broadcaster	City	Theme	Winner
1	25 May	RAI	(Italy) (Sardinia) La Maddalena	"The Seven Islands of the Archipelago"	(United Kingdom) Charnwood
2	8 June	JRT (TV Belgrade)	(Socialist Federal Republic of Yugoslavia) (Socialist Republic of Croatia) Šibenik	"Children’s Folk Tales"	(France) Foix
3	29 June	Antenne 2	(France) Issy-les-Moulineaux	"Transport Through the Ages"	(Socialist Federal Republic of Yugoslavia) (Socialist Republic of Serbia) Čačak
4	13 July	SRG SSR TSI (TSI)	(Switzerland) Tesserete	"Local Customs, Folklore and Festivals"	(Switzerland) Tesserete
5	27 July	RTP	(Portugal) (Madeira) Funchal	"Madeiran Life"	(Belgium) Rochefort; (Portugal) Madeira
6	10 August	BBC	(United Kingdom) Sherborne	"The Sailors' Homecoming"	(Switzerland) Versoix
7	24 August	BRT	(Belgium) Ghent	"Gent in the Year 1544"	(France) Le Cannet
IF	7 September	RAI	(Italy) Udine	"Choice Games"	(Belgium) Rochefort

== Results ==
=== Heat 1 ===
Heat 1 was hosted by RAI on 25 May 1982 at the port of La Maddalena, Italy, its theme being the Maddalena archipelago and its seven islands, and was presented by Michele Gammino and Simona Izzo.

==== Heat result ====
Place	Country	Town	Points
1	GB	Charnwood	44
2	I	La Maddalena	38
3	CH	Gordola	33
3	YU	Zadar	33
5	P	Tomar	29
6	F	Sancerre	25
7	B	Jette	20

==== Detailed scoreboard ====
Team	Country	Games									
Team	Country	1	2	3	4	5	6	7	FR	8	Total
Jette	B	3	1	2	1	5	3	—N/a	2	2	20
Gordola	CH	—N/a	2	6	4	5	6	1	1	1	33
Sancerre	F	1	—N/a	1	2	5	1	6	6	6	25
Charnwood	GB	2	12	—N/a	6	6	5	5	3	3	44
La Maddalena	I	5	6	5	—N/a	2	6	3	5	5	38
Tomar	P	6	3	4	5	—N/a	2	2	4	6	29
Zadar	YU	4	5	4	3	2	—N/a	4	7	4	33

=== Heat 2 ===
Heat 2 was hosted by TV Belgrade on behalf of JRT on 8 June 1982 at the Rade Končar Stadium in Šibenik, Yugoslavia, its theme being the tales of the Brothers Grimm, and was presented by Dunja Figenvald and Minja Subota.

==== Heat result ====
Place	Country	Town	Points
1	F	Foix	47
2	B	Wielsbeke	43
3	YU	Šibenik	38
4	GB	Keswick	30
5	P	Azores	29
6	I	San Benedetto del Tronto	20
7	CH	Vallée de Joux	13

==== Detailed scoreboard ====
Team	Country	Games									
Team	Country	1	2	3	4	5	6	7	FR	8	Total
Wielsbeke	B	4	12	2	1	—N/a	5	6	7	6	43
Vallée de Joux	CH	1	4	1	1	3	—N/a	1	1	1	13
Foix	F	6	4	4	5	5	12	—N/a	6	5	47
Keswick	GB	—N/a	1	6	1	4	3	5	3	7	30
San Benedetto del Tronto	I	3	—N/a	5	1	1	1	2	4	3	20
Azores	P	2	4	—N/a	6	2	2	6	5	2	29
Šibenik	YU	6	9	3	—N/a	6	4	3	3	4	38

=== Heat 3 ===
Heat 3 was hosted by Antenne 2 on 29 June 1982 at Île Saint-Germain in Issy-les-Moulineaux, France, its theme being the means of transport through time, and was presented by Simone Garnier and Guy Lux.

==== Heat result ====
Place	Country	Town	Points
1	YU	Čačak	45
2	F	Issy-les-Moulineaux	39
3	CH	Romanshorn	33
4	B	Spa	31
5	P	Algarve	28
6	GB	Christchurch	26
7	I	Lanuvio	25

==== Detailed scoreboard ====
Team	Country	Games									
Team	Country	1	2	3	4	5	6	7	FR	8	Total
Spa	B	2	—N/a	3	6	5	4	3	6	2	31
Romanshorn	CH	3	5	—N/a	12	3	1	1	5	3	33
Issy-les-Moulineaux	F	6	4	2	—N/a	6	5	5	7	4	39
Christchurch	GB	2	2	1	2	—N/a	3	6	4	6	26
Lanuvio	I	4	1	5	3	3	—N/a	2	2	5	25
Algarve	P	12	3	6	1	1	3	—N/a	1	1	28
Čačak	YU	—N/a	6	4	9	6	6	4	3	7	45

=== Heat 4 ===
Heat 4 was hosted by TSI on behalf of SRG SSR TSI on 13 July 1982 at the grounds of the Army barracks in Tesserete, Switzerland, its theme being the customs, folklore, and festivals of the town, and was presented by Mascia Cantoni and Ezio Guidi.

==== Heat result ====
Place	Country	Town	Points
1	CH	Tesserete	45
2	B	Turnhout	42
3	I	Garda	35
4	P	Caldas da Rainha	32
5	GB	Lochgilphead	25
6	YU	Umag	23
7	F	Vendôme	19

==== Detailed scoreboard ====
Team	Country	Games									
Team	Country	1	2	3	4	5	6	7	FR	8	Total
Turnhout	B	5	6	—N/a	12	3	5	4	5	2	42
Tesserete	CH	5	1	5	—N/a	12	6	6	7	7	45
Vendôme	F	2	3	1	5	—N/a	1	1	1	5	19
Lochgilphead	GB	6	5	1	1	4	—N/a	2	2	4	25
Garda	I	2	4	6	4	1	6	—N/a	6	6	35
Caldas da Rainha	P	—N/a	2	1	3	3	3	9	4	7	32
Umag	YU	3	—N/a	5	2	5	1	3	3	1	23

=== Heat 5 ===
Heat 5 was hosted by RTP on 27 July 1982 at the grounds of a high school in Funchal, Portugal, its theme being the traditions of Madeira, and was presented by Eládio Clímaco, Alice Cruz, and Maria João Carreira.

==== Heat result ====
Place	Country	Town	Points
1	B	Rochefort	40
1	P	Madeira	40
3	CH	Schinznach-Bad	37
3	YU	Novi Sad	37
5	I	Recoaro Terme	28
6	F	Lodève	25
7	GB	Rotherham	16

==== Detailed scoreboard ====
Team	Country	Games									
Team	Country	1	2	3	4	5	6	7	FR	8	Total
Rochefort	B	6	4	9	5	4	—N/a	4	7	1	40
Schinznach-Bad	CH	1	12	3	6	5	3	—N/a	3	4	37
Lodève	F	—N/a	12	2	2	2	2	2	1	2	25
Rotherham	GB	1	—N/a	1	1	1	1	4	2	5	16
Recoaro Terme	I	1	2	—N/a	3	3	6	1	5	7	28
Madeira	P	1	1	6	—N/a	12	5	6	6	3	40
Novi Sad	YU	5	3	4	6	—N/a	4	5	4	6	37

=== Heat 6 ===
Heat 6 was hosted by the BBC on 10 August 1982 at the grounds of the Castle of Sherborne, United Kingdom, its theme being pirates, and was presented by Stuart Hall and Brian Cant.

==== Heat result ====
Place	Country	Town	Points
1	CH	Versoix	46
2	YU	Ulcinj	39
3	GB	West Dorset	38
3	P	Mateus (Vila Real)	38
5	F	Dieppe	34
6	I	Lizzano	30
7	B	Frameries	14

==== Detailed scoreboard ====
Team	Country	Games									
Team	Country	1	2	3	4	5	6	7	FR	8	Total
Frameries	B	—N/a	1	2	2	1	2	3	1	2	14
Versoix	CH	6	—N/a	6	12	3	4	6	5	4	46
Dieppe	F	1	4	—N/a	4	2	9	2	7	5	34
West Dorset	GB	3	9	4	—N/a	4	1	5	6	6	38
Lizzano	I	2	3	3	3	—N/a	6	5	5	3	30
Mateus (Vila Real)	P	5	6	5	9	6	—N/a	1	5	1	38
Ulcinj	YU	4	2	2	1	6	12	—N/a	5	7	39

=== Heat 7 ===
Heat 7 was hosted by BRT on 24 August 1982 at the Sint-Pietersplein in Ghent, Belgium, was themed about the town in 1543, and was presented by Mike Verdrengh and Walter Capiau.

==== Heat result ====
Place	Country	Town	Points
1	F	Le Cannet	39
2	CH	Plaffeien	37
2	GB	Gloucester	37
4	B	Ghent	34
5	YU	Jajce	30
6	P	Viseu	28
7	I	Maratea	17

==== Detailed scoreboard ====
Team	Country	Games									
Team	Country	1	2	3	4	5	6	7	FR	8	Total
Ghent	B	1	3	3	—N/a	6	3	4	7	7	34
Plaffeien	CH	4	6	1	6	—N/a	6	2	6	6	37
Le Cannet	F	3	4	6	4	6	—N/a	6	5	5	39
Gloucester	GB	6	5	9	2	1	6	—N/a	4	4	37
Maratea	I	—N/a	1	3	1	5	2	1	1	3	17
Viseu	P	1	—N/a	12	3	2	1	5	3	1	28
Jajce	YU	5	1	—N/a	5	3	9	3	2	2	30

=== Qualifiers ===
The teams with the most points from each country advanced to the grand final:

Country	Town	Place won	Points won
F	Foix	1	47
CH	Versoix	1	46
YU	Čačak	1	45
GB	Charnwood	1	44
CH	Madeira	1	40
B	Rochefort	1	40
I	La Maddalena	2	38

== Final ==
The final was hosted by RAI on 7 September 1982 at the Piazzale del Mercatale in Urbino, Italy, was themed about the symbols of European countries, and was presented by Michele Gammino and Simona Izzo.

=== Final result ===
Place	Country	Town	Points
1	B	Rochefort	45
2	CH	Versoix	38
3	P	Madeira	35
4	I	La Maddalena	33
5	GB	Charnwood	30
6	YU	Čačak	28
7	F	Foix	24

==== Detailed scoreboard ====
Team	Country	Games									
Team	Country	1	2	3	4	5	6	7	FR	8	Total
Rochefort	B	—N/a	12	5	3	2	6	5	7	5	45
Versoix	CH	6	5	12	—N/a	6	4	1	1	3	38
Foix	F	3	2	2	2	3	4	—N/a	3	4	24
Charnwood	GB	5	1	1	4	9	—N/a	3	5	2	30
La Maddalena	I	9	3	—N/a	5	2	1	4	2	7	33
Madeira	P	2	—N/a	3	2	4	2	12	4	6	35
Čačak	YU	2	4	4	6	—N/a	3	2	6	1	28

== Broadcasts ==
The competition was transmitted to the participating broadcasters via the Eurovision network. In most cases, broadcasters aired the episodes in their territory with a delay of one or two days. Only some broadcasters aired heat 1 and the final live.

Country	Broadcaster(s)	Channel(s)	Presenter(s)/Commentator(s)	Ref.
Belgium	RTBF	RTBF1	Paule Herreman	
Belgium	BRT	TV1	Mike Verdrengh	
France	Antenne 2		Simone Garnier; Guy Lux; Claude Savarit	
Italy	RAI	Rete 2	Michele Gammino; Simona Izzo	
Portugal	RTP	RTP1	Eládio Clímaco; Alice Cruz	
Switzerland	SRG SSR TSI	TSR	Jacques Deschenaux; Georges Kleinmann	
Switzerland	SRG SSR TSI	TV DRS	Jan Hiermeyer	
Switzerland	SRG SSR TSI	TSI	Mascia Cantoni; Ezio Guidi	
United Kingdom	BBC	BBC1	Stuart Hall	
Yugoslavia	JRT	TV Belgrade 1, TV Zagreb 1	Minja Subota	
Yugoslavia	JRT	TV Ljubljana 2	—N/a	
