= Jeux sans frontières season 15 =

Jeux sans frontières
- Season 15
- No. of teams: 8 countries
- Winner: (France) Bar-le-Duc
- Runner-up: (Socialist Federal Republic of Yugoslavia) Zrenjanin
- Head referees: Gennaro Olivieri; Guido Pancaldi
- No. of episodes: 9

Release
- Original release: 29 May – 19 September 1979

Season chronology
- ← Previous; Season 14 Next → Season 16

The 15th season of the international television game show Jeux sans frontières was held in the summer of 1979. Broadcasters from Belgium, France, Italy, Switzerland, the United Kingdom, West Germany, Yugoslavia and, for the first time, Portugal participated in the competition coordinated by the European Broadcasting Union (EBU). The different heats were hosted by each of the participant broadcasters in locations in their countries such as Ascona (Switzerland), Saint-Gaudens (France), Donji Milanovac (Yugoslavia), Chioggia (Italy), Brussels (Belgium), Bonn (West Germany), St Albans (United Kingdom), and Cascais (Portugal). The grand final was held in Bordeaux (France). The head international referees in charge of supervising the competition were Gennaro Olivieri and Guido Pancaldi.

The season was won by the team from Bar-le-Duc, France, the runner-up being the team from Zrenjanin, Yugoslavia.

== Participants ==
Country	Broadcaster	Code	Colour
Belgium	RTBF / BRT	B	Yellow
France	Antenne 2	F	Green
Italy	RAI	I	Blue
Portugal	RTP	P	Orange
Switzerland	SRG SSR TSI	CH	White and red
United Kingdom	BBC	GB	Red
West Germany	ARD	D	Light blue
Yugoslavia	JRT	YU	White and blue

== Heats ==
=== Heat 1 ===
Heat 1 was hosted by TSI on behalf of SRG SSR TSI on 29 May 1979 in Ascona, Switzerland, presented by Mascia Cantoni and Ezio Guidi.

Place	Country	Town	Points
1	CH	Ascona	45
2	GB	Arun	44
3	I	Ancona	40
4	P	Braga	38
5	D	Unterschleißheim	34
5	YU	Tetovo	34
7	B	Tubize	27
8	F	Digne-les-Bains	26

=== Heat 2 ===
Heat 2 was hosted by Antenne 2 on 13 June 1979 in Saint-Gaudens, France, presented by Guy Lux and Simone Garnier.

Place	Country	Town	Points
1	YU	Zrenjanin	53
2	I	Aosta	47
3	D	Mering	45
4	B	Beringen	38
5	CH	Romont	33
5	GB	Henley-on-Thames	33
7	P	Aveiro	28
8	F	Saint-Gaudens	21

=== Heat 3 ===
Heat 3 was hosted by TV Belgrade on behalf of JRT on 27 June 1979 in Donji Milanovac, Yugoslavia, presented by Dunja Lango, Dragan Nikitović and Minja Subota.

Place	Country	Town	Points
1	YU	Donji Milanovac	48
2	CH	Weggis	43
3	GB	North Walsham	35
4	B	Theux	34
5	D	Starnberg	32
6	P	Horta	29
7	F	Saint-Chamond	28
8	I	Castel San Pietro Terme	23

=== Heat 4 ===
Heat 4 was hosted by RAI on 11 July 1979 in Chioggia, Italy, presented by Michele Gammino and Milly Carlucci.

Place	Country	Town	Points
1	I	Chioggia	46
2	GB	Dudley	44
3	F	Troyes	43
4	B	Izegem	38
4	D	Aurich	38
6	CH	Monthey	29
7	P	Évora	26
8	YU	Bar	23

=== Heat 5 ===
Heat 5 was hosted by RTBF and BRT on 25 July 1979 in Brussels, Belgium, presented by Mike Verdrengh and Paule Herreman.

Place	Country	Town	Points
1	YU	Belgrade	51
2	CH	Zürich	46
3	F	Paris	40
4	D	Neumünster	38
5	B	Brussels	35
6	I	Rome	30
7	GB	Kingston-upon-Thames	27
8	P	Lisbon	26

=== Heat 6 ===
Heat 6 was hosted by ARD on 8 August 1979 in Bonn, West Germany, presented by Manfred Erdenberger and Heribert Faßbender.

Place	Country	Town	Points
1	D	Bonn	47
2	YU	Karlovac	43
3	I	Merano	42
4	GB	Douglas	40
5	F	Mandelieu-la-Napoule	36
6	P	Funchal	32
7	CH	Trélex	28
8	B	Mouscron	20

=== Heat 7 ===
Heat 7 was hosted by the BBC on 21 August 1979 in St Albans, United Kingdom, presented by Stuart Hall and Eddie Waring.

Place	Country	Town	Points
1	F	Bar-le-Duc	52
2	YU	Banja Luka	49
3	B	Lierde	42
4	GB	St Albans	40
5	D	Bad Segeberg	39
6	CH	Roveredo	33
7	I	Ragusa	23
8	P	Albufeira	14

=== Heat 8 ===
Heat 8 was hosted by RTP on 5 September 1979 in Cascais, Portugal, presented by Eládio Clímaco and Fialho Gouveia.

Place	Country	Town	Points
1	GB	Bury	43
2	CH	Rorschach	41
2	F	Rochefort-Samson	41
4	D	Aichach	38
5	YU	Nova Gorica	35
6	B	Eupen	32
6	P	Cascais-Estoril	32
8	I	Eboli	26

=== Qualifiers ===
The teams with the most points from each country advanced to the grand final:

Country	Town	Place won	Points won
YU	Zrenjanin	1	53
F	Bar-le-Duc	1	52
D	Bonn	1	47
I	Chioggia	1	46
CH	Ascona	1	45
GB	Bury	1	43
B	Lierde	3	42
P	Braga	4	38

== Final ==
The final was hosted by Antenne 2 on 19 September 1979 in Bordeaux, France, presented by Guy Lux and Simone Garnier.

Place	Country	Town	Points
1	F	Bar-le-Duc	50
2	YU	Zrenjanin	43
3	B	Lierde	40
4	CH	Ascona	37
5	I	Chioggia	33
6	D	Bonn	30
6	GB	Bury	30
8	P	Braga	27
