= Jeux sans frontières season 24 =

Jeux sans frontières
- Season 24
- No. of teams: 7 countries
- Winner: (Hungary) Kecskemét
- Runner-up: (Czech Republic) Šumperk
- Head referee: Denis Pettiaux
- No. of episodes: 11

Release
- Original network: ČT1; Raiuno; TSR; TSI; S4C; ET1; RTP Canal 1; MTV1
- Original release: June 1993 – October 1993

Season chronology
- ← Previous; Season 23 Next → Season 25

The 24th season of the international television game show Jeux sans frontières was held in the summer of 1993. Broadcasters from the Czech Republic, Greece, Hungary, Italy, Portugal, Switzerland, and Wales participated in the competition coordinated by the European Broadcasting Union (EBU). The different heats were hosted by some of the participant broadcasters in locations in their countries such as Passariano (Italy), Coimbra (Portugal), Athens (Greece), Rhyl (Wales), Loèche-les-Bains (Switzerland), and Kecskemét (Hungary). The grand final was held in Karlovy Vary (Czech Republic). The head international referee in charge of supervising the competition was Denis Pettiaux.

For each heat, each broadcaster sent a mixed team of twelve members (six men and six women) from a city or town from its country that competed against each other in a series of games –funny physical games played in outlandish costumes, though none-the-less technically difficult– themed in the specific topic of the episode. After the ten heats, the most successful team from each country competed in the grand final. Each of the episodes was presented by the host broadcaster in its own language. Each of the participating broadcasters had their own presenters who did some on-site presentations for their audience and commented on the competition in their language. Due the complexity of the production, and that each broadcaster had its own personalized coverage, the episodes were filmed first and each broadcaster broadcast them at their convenience later.

The season was won by the team from Kecskemét, Hungary, being the runner-up the team from Šumperk, the Czech Republic.

== Participants ==
Country	Broadcaster	Code	Colour
Czech Republic	ČT	CZ	Orange
Greece	ERT	GR	Blue and white
Hungary	MTV	H	Yellow
Italy	RAI	I	Light blue
Portugal	RTP	P	Green
Switzerland	SRG SSR	CH	White and red
Wales	S4C	GB	Red

== Heats ==
=== Heat 1 ===
Heat 1 was hosted by S4C in Rhyl, Wales.

Place	Country	Town	Points
1	P	Santarém	59
2	CH	Le Bouveret	58
3	H	Paks	47
4	I	Brebbia	44
5	CZ	Sedlčany	32
5	GB	Rhyl	32
7	GR	Argyroupoli	25

=== Heat 2 ===
Heat 2 was hosted by RAI in Passariano, Italy.

Place	Country	Town	Points
1	H	Pápa	49
2	CH	Yverdon-les-Bains	47
3	CZ	Pardubice	41
4	I	San Daniele del Friuli	39
4	P	Santo Tirso	39
6	GB	Caerdydd	29
6	GR	Chania	29

=== Heat 3 ===
Heat 3 was hosted by TSR on behalf of SRG SSR in Loèche-les-Bains, Switzerland.

Place	Country	Town	Points
1	P	Felgueiras	52
2	H	Szekszárd	50
3	CZ	Litovel	46
4	I	Altopiano delle Cinquemiglia	43
5	CH	Giornico	42
6	GB	Rhuthun	34
7	GR	Ioannina	28

=== Heat 4 ===
Heat 4 was hosted by ERT in Amarousion, Athens, Greece.

Place	Country	Town	Points
1	I	Firenze	50
2	H	Sárospatak	48
3	CH	Locarno	47
4	P	Aveiro	46
5	GB	Rhydaman	40
6	CZ	Mariánské Hory	32
7	GR	Amarousion	22

=== Heat 5 ===
Heat 5 was hosted by RTP in Coimbra, Portugal.

Place	Country	Town	Points
1	CZ	Šumperk	62
2	GB	Llantrisant	51
3	CH	Geneva	50
4	P	Batalha	46
5	H	Hajdúszoboszló	35
6	GR	Veria	22
6	I	Tursi	23

=== Heat 6 ===
Heat 6 was hosted by S4C in Rhyl, Wales.

Place	Country	Town	Points
1	I	Cogne	54
2	CZ	Krnov	49
2	H	Székesfehérvár	49
4	P	Portimão	46
5	GB	Wrecsam	36
6	CH	San Bernardino	32
7	GR	Chalandri	18

=== Heat 7 ===
Heat 7 was hosted by RAI in Passariano, Italy.

Place	Country	Town	Points
1	I	Lignano Sabbiadoro	51
2	CZ	Smržovka	47
3	CH	Tesserete	46
4	GR	Poros	45
5	H	Debrecen	44
6	P	Évora	36
7	GB	Abertawe	25

=== Heat 8 ===
Heat 8 was hosted by TSR on behalf of SRG SSR in Loèche-les-Bains, Switzerland.

Place	Country	Town	Points
1	P	Amadora	55
2	I	Rosolina Mare	53
3	CH	Loèche-les-Bains	44
4	CZ	Karlovy Vary	42
5	H	Gödöllő	37
6	GB	Bethesda	35
7	GR	Kaisariani	28

=== Heat 9 ===
Heat 9 was hosted by RTP in Coimbra, Portugal.

Place	Country	Town	Points
1	I	Siracusa	51
2	P	Coimbra	50
3	CZ	Písek	48
4	H	Tapolca	47
5	CH	Le Noirmont	37
6	GB	Caerfyrddin	30
7	GR	Patras	27

=== Heat 10 ===
Heat 10 was hosted by MTV in Kecskemét, Hungary

Place	Country	Town	Points
1	H	Kecskemét	61
2	I	Agordo	52
3	CZ	Trojanovice	40
4	P	Figueira da Foz	35
5	GB	Llandrindod	34
6	GR	Agioi Anargyroi	31
7	CH	Fully	26

=== Qualifiers ===
The teams with the most points from each country advanced to the grand final:

Country	Town	Place won	Points won
CH	Le Bouveret	2	58
CZ	Šumperk	1	62
GB	Llantrisant	2	51
GR	Poros	4	45
H	Kecskemét	1	61
I	Cogne	1	54
P	Santarém	1	59

== Final ==
The final round was hosted by ČT in Karlovy Vary, Czech Republic.

Place	Country	Town	Points
1	H	Kecskemét	56
2	CZ	Šumperk	50
3	CH	Le Bouveret	48
4	GR	Poros	42
5	GB	Llantrisant	40
6	I	Cogne	36
7	P	Santarém	24

== Broadcasts ==
Broadcasters and commentators in participating countries
Country	Broadcaster(s)	Channel(s)	Local presenter(s)/Commentator(s)	Ref.
Czech Republic	ČT	ČT1	Marcela Augustová; Petr Vichnar	
Greece	ERT	ET1	Dafni Bokota; Vera Stratakou	
Hungary	MTV	MTV1	Dorottya Geszler	
Italy	RAI	Raiuno	Ettore Andenna	
Portugal	RTP	RTP Canal 1	Eládio Clímaco; Cristina Lebre	
Switzerland	SRG SSR	TSR	Catherine Sommer; Ivan Frésard	
Switzerland	SRG SSR	TSI	Caterina Ruggeri; Paolo Calissano	
Wales	S4C	S4C	Nia Chiswell; Iestyn Garlick	
