= Jeux sans frontières season 23 =

Jeux sans frontières
- Season 23
- No. of teams: 8 countries
- Winner: (Czechoslovakia) Třebíč
- Runners-up: (Italy) Breuil-Cervinia (Portugal) Lisbon
- Head referee: Denis Pettiaux
- No. of episodes: 11

Release
- Original network: ČST1; Antenne 2; Raiuno; RTP Canal 1; La Primera; TSR; TV7; S4C
- Original release: June 1992 – September 1992

Season chronology
- ← Previous; Season 22 Next → Season 24

The 23rd season of the international television game show Jeux sans frontières was held in the summer of 1992. Broadcasters from Czechoslovakia, France, Italy, Portugal, Spain, Switzerland, Tunisia, and Wales participated in the competition coordinated by the European Broadcasting Union (EBU). The different heats were hosted by some of the participant broadcasters in locations in their countries such as Casale Monferrato (Italy), Lisbon (Portugal), Alfortville (France), Swansea (Wales), and Třebíč and Rožnov pod Radhoštěm (Czechoslovakia). The grand final was held in Ponta Delgada (Portugal). The head international referee in charge of supervising the competition was Denis Pettiaux.

For each heat, each broadcaster sent a mixed team of twelve members (six men and six women) from a city or town from its country that competed against each other in a series of games –funny physical games played in outlandish costumes, though none-the-less technically difficult– themed in the specific topic of the episode. After the ten heats, the most successful team from each country competed in the grand final. Each of the episodes was presented by the host broadcaster in its own language. Each of the participating broadcasters had their own presenters who did some on-site presentations for their audience and commented on the competition in their language. Due the complexity of the production, and that each broadcaster had its own personalized coverage, the episodes were filmed first and each broadcaster broadcast them at their convenience later.

The season was won by the team from Třebíč in the then Czechoslovakia, being the runner-up the team from Breuil-Cervinia, Italy and the team from Lisbon, Portugal. This was the first and only season in which Tunisia performed in the competition. They were the only African country in the show and they were not very successful, as they were most of the time finished in the lower half of the table, only archiving a second place in Heat 9, thanks to Nabeul, who qualified to the Final with it, but finished last there.

== Participants ==
Country	Broadcaster	Code	Colour	Cities
Czechoslovakia	ČST	CS	Orange	Prague
Czechoslovakia	ČST	CS	Orange	Poděbrady
Czechoslovakia	ČST	CS	Orange	Sokolov
Czechoslovakia	ČST	CS	Orange	Třebíč
Czechoslovakia	ČST	CS	Orange	Šternberk
Czechoslovakia	ČST	CS	Orange	Rýmařov
Czechoslovakia	ČST	CS	Orange	Tábor
Czechoslovakia	ČST	CS	Orange	Chrudim
Czechoslovakia	ČST	CS	Orange	Rožnov pod Radhoštěm
Czechoslovakia	ČST	CS	Orange	Jablonec nad Nisou
France	Antenne 2	F	Blue and white	Cahors
France	Antenne 2	F	Blue and white	Le Havre
France	Antenne 2	F	Blue and white	Alfortville
France	Antenne 2	F	Blue and white	Bourg-en-Bresse
France	Antenne 2	F	Blue and white	La Ciotat
France	Antenne 2	F	Blue and white	Tourcoing
France	Antenne 2	F	Blue and white	Sallanches
France	Antenne 2	F	Blue and white	Strasbourg
France	Antenne 2	F	Blue and white	Pertuis
Italy	RAI	I	Light blue	Riccò del Golfo di Spezia
Italy	RAI	I	Light blue	Varazze
Italy	RAI	I	Light blue	Castelfidardo
Italy	RAI	I	Light blue	Carpenedolo
Italy	RAI	I	Light blue	Breuil-Cervinia
Italy	RAI	I	Light blue	Casale Monferrato
Italy	RAI	I	Light blue	Paestum
Italy	RAI	I	Light blue	Langhirano
Italy	RAI	I	Light blue	San Pellegrino Terme
Italy	RAI	I	Light blue	Vigevano
Portugal	RTP	P	Green	Chaves
Portugal	RTP	P	Green	Azores
Portugal	RTP	P	Green	Santarém
Portugal	RTP	P	Green	Moura
Portugal	RTP	P	Green	Olhão
Portugal	RTP	P	Green	Felgueiras
Portugal	RTP	P	Green	Lisbon
Portugal	RTP	P	Green	Maia
Portugal	RTP	P	Green	Aveiro
Portugal	RTP	P	Green	Peso da Régua
Spain	TVE	E	Red	Macael
Spain	TVE	E	Red	Lérida
Spain	TVE	E	Red	Ciudad Rodrigo
Spain	TVE	E	Red	Cangas de Onís
Spain	TVE	E	Red	Santa Cruz de Tenerife
Spain	TVE	E	Red	Calatayud
Spain	TVE	E	Red	Ibiza
Spain	TVE	E	Red	Torrevieja
Spain	TVE	E	Red	Córdoba
Spain	TVE	E	Red	Palma de Mallorca
Switzerland	SRG SSR	CH	White and red	La Chaux-de-Fonds
Switzerland	SRG SSR	CH	White and red	Estavayer-le-Lac
Switzerland	SRG SSR	CH	White and red	La Côte
Switzerland	SRG SSR	CH	White and red	Martigny
Switzerland	SRG SSR	CH	White and red	Coppet
Switzerland	SRG SSR	CH	White and red	Jura
Switzerland	SRG SSR	CH	White and red	Carouge
Switzerland	SRG SSR	CH	White and red	Romont
Switzerland	SRG SSR	CH	White and red	La Neuveville-Nods
Switzerland	SRG SSR	CH	White and red	Charmey
Tunisia	ERTT	TU	Yellow	Kairouan
Tunisia	ERTT	TU	Yellow	Sidi Bou Said
Tunisia	ERTT	TU	Yellow	Sousse
Tunisia	ERTT	TU	Yellow	Jerba
Tunisia	ERTT	TU	Yellow	Hammamet
Tunisia	ERTT	TU	Yellow	Tabarka
Tunisia	ERTT	TU	Yellow	Carthage
Tunisia	ERTT	TU	Yellow	Sfax
Tunisia	ERTT	TU	Yellow	Nabeul
Tunisia	ERTT	TU	Yellow	Monastir
Wales	S4C	GB	Pink	Carmarthen (Caerfyrddin)
Wales	S4C	GB	Pink	Mold (Yr Wyddgrug)
Wales	S4C	GB	Pink	Wrexham (Wrecsam)
Wales	S4C	GB	Pink	Newtown (Y Drenewydd)
Wales	S4C	GB	Pink	Swansea (Abertawe)
Wales	S4C	GB	Pink	Rhuddlan
Wales	S4C	GB	Pink	Caernarfon
Wales	S4C	GB	Pink	Cwm Mawr
Wales	S4C	GB	Pink	Cardiff (Caerdydd)

== Heats ==
=== Heat 1 ===
Heat 1 was hosted by RAI at Mercato Pavia in Casale Monferrato, Italy, was themed about cinema, and was presented by Ettore Andenna and Maria Teresa Ruta.

Place	Country	Town	Points
1	CS	Prague	63
2	CH	La Chaux-de-Fonds	60
2	F	Cahors	60
4	E	Macael	55
5	GB	Carmarthen	51
6	I	Riccò del Golfo di Spezia	43
6	P	Chaves	43
8	TU	Kairouan	29

=== Heat 2 ===
Heat 2 was hosted by RTP in front of the Belém Tower in Lisbon, Portugal, was themed about Portuguese explorations, and was presented by Eládio Clímaco and Ana do Carmo.

Place	Country	Town	Points
1	F	Le Havre	66
2	P	Azores	63
3	I	Varazze	62
4	E	Lérida	51
5	CH	Estavayer-le-Lac	48
6	CS	Poděbrady	46
7	TU	Sidi Bou Said	37
8	GB	Mold	30

=== Heat 3 ===
Heat 3 was hosted by Antenne 2 at Espace Blanqui in Alfortville, Paris, France, was themed about the Fables of La Fontaine, and was presented by Georges Beller and Daniela Lumbroso.

Place	Country	Town	Points
1	CH	La Côte	72
2	I	Castelfidardo	67
3	P	Santarém	57
4	GB	Wrexham	54
5	CS	Sokolov	43
6	F	Alfortville	39
7	E	Ciudad Rodrigo	38
8	TU	Sousse	32

=== Heat 4 ===
Heat 4 was hosted by ČST at the municipal swimming pool in Třebíč, Czechoslovakia, was themed about summer beach games, and was presented by Martina Adamcová and Pavel Zedníček.

Place	Country	Town	Points
1	CS	Třebíč	75
2	I	Carpenedolo	60
3	E	Cangas de Onís	58
4	CH	Martigny	53
5	P	Moura	46
6	F	Bourg-en-Bresse	45
7	GB	Newtown	38
8	TU	Jerba	25

=== Heat 5 ===
Heat 5 was hosted by S4C at the Morfa Stadium in Swansea, United Kingdom, was themed about the history of Swansea, and was presented by Nia Chiswell and Iestyn Garlick.

Place	Country	Town	Points
1	I	Breuil-Cervinia	61
1	P	Olhão	61
3	CS	Šternberk	57
4	E	Santa Cruz de Tenerife	54
5	GB	Swansea	48
6	CH	Coppet	45
7	TU	Hammamet	42
8	F	La Ciotat	30

=== Heat 6 ===
Heat 6 was hosted by RAI at Mercato Pavia in Casale Monferrato, Italy, was themed about the masterpieces of Italian art, and was presented by Ettore Andenna and Maria Teresa Ruta.

Place	Country	Town	Points
1	P	Felgueiras	65
2	F	Tourcoing	59
3	CH	Jura	58
3	CS	Rýmařov	58
3	I	Casale Monferrato	58
6	E	Calatayud	51
7	GB	Rhuddlan	40
8	TU	Tabarka	14

=== Heat 7 ===
Heat 7 was hosted by RTP in front of the Belém Tower in Lisbon, Portugal, was themed about the history and traditions of Lisbon, and was presented by Eládio Clímaco and Ana do Carmo.

Place	Country	Town	Points
1	P	Lisbon	81
2	CH	Carouge	53
2	GB	Carnarvon	53
4	F	Sallanches	48
5	I	Paestum	45
6	CS	Tábor	44
6	E	Ibiza	44
8	TU	Carthage	30

=== Heat 8 ===
Heat 8 was hosted by Antenne 2 at Espace Blanqui in Alfortville, Paris, France, was themed about One Thousand and One Nights, and was presented by Georges Beller and Daniela Lumbroso.

Place	Country	Town	Points
1	GB	Cwm Mawr	62
2	CH	Romont	58
2	E	Torrevieja	58
4	CS	Chrudim	56
4	P	Maia	56
6	I	Langhirano	47
7	F	Alfortville	31
8	TU	Sfax	30

=== Heat 9 ===
Heat 9 was hosted by ČST at the Little Wooden Town of the Wallachian Open Air Museum in Rožnov pod Radhoštěm, Czechoslovakia, was themed about the traditions of the Czech Republic, and was presented by Martina Adamcová and Pavel Zedníček.

Place	Country	Town	Points
1	P	Aveiro	60
2	TU	Nabeul	54
3	CS	Rožnov pod Radhoštěm	53
4	I	San Pellegrino Terme	51
5	E	Córdoba	50
6	GB	Cardiff	49
7	CH	La Neuveville-Nods	41
7	F	Strasbourg	41

=== Heat 10 ===
Heat 10 was hosted by S4C at the Morfa Stadium in Swansea, United Kingdom, was themed about Welsh Inventions, and was presented by Nia Chiswell and Iestyn Garlick.

Place	Country	Town	Points
1	E	Palma, Majorca	64
2	CS	Jablonec nad Nisou	53
3	P	Peso da Régua	52
4	CH	Charmey	49
4	I	Vigevano	49
6	F	Pertuis	45
6	TU	Monastir	45
8	GB	Swansea	42

=== Qualifiers ===
The teams with the most points from each country advanced to the grand final:

Country	Town	Place won	Points won
CH	La Côte	1	72
CS	Třebíč	1	75
GB	Cwm Mawr	1	62
E	Palma de Mallorca	1	64
TU	Nabeul	2	54
I	Breuil-Cervinia	1	61
P	Lisbon	1	81
F	Le Havre	1	66

== Final ==
The final round was held by RTP in Ponta Delgada, Azores, Portugal, was themed about the history and culture of the Azores, and was presented by Eládio Clímaco, Ana do Carmo, and Conceição Cabral.

Place	Country	Town	Points
1	CS	Třebíč	64
2	I	Breuil-Cervinia	57
2	P	Lisbon	57
4	CH	La Côte	49
4	F	Le Havre	49
6	E	Palma de Mallorca	47
7	GB	Cwm Mawr	40
8	TU	Nabeul	34

== Broadcasts ==
Broadcasters and commentators in participating countries
Country	Broadcaster(s)	Channel(s)	Local presenter(s)/Commentator(s)	Ref.
Czechoslovakia	ČST	ČST1	Martina Adamcová; Pavel Zedníček	
France	Antenne 2		Georges Beller; Daniela Lumbroso	
Italy	RAI	Raiuno	Ettore Andenna; Maria Teresa Ruta	
Portugal	RTP	RTP Canal 1	Eládio Clímaco; Ana do Carmo	
Spain	TVE	La Primera	Elisa Matilla; César Heinrich	
Switzerland	SRG SSR	TSR	Catherine Sommer; Ivan Frésard	
Tunisia	ERTT	TV7	Donia Chaouch; Georges Beller; Daniela Lumbroso	
Wales	S4C	S4C	Nia Chiswell; Iestyn Garlick	
