= Jeux sans frontières season 22 =

Jeux sans frontières
- Season 22
- No. of teams: 6 countries
- Winner: (Italy) Vigevano
- Runner-up: (Portugal) Leiria
- Head referees: Bernard Galley; Denis Pettiaux
- No. of episodes: 11

Release
- Original network: Antenne 2; RTP Canal 1; Raiuno; La 2; S4C
- Original release: July 1991 – September 1991

Season chronology
- ← Previous; Season 21 Next → Season 23

The 22nd season of the international television game show Jeux sans frontières was held in the summer of 1991. Broadcasters from France, Italy, Portugal, San Marino, Spain, and Wales participated in the competition coordinated by the European Broadcasting Union (EBU). The different heats were hosted by some of the participant broadcasters in locations in their countries such as Vigevano (Italy), Figueira da Foz (Portugal), Montpellier (France), Pozuelo de Alarcón (Spain), and Llanberis (Wales). The grand final was held in Saint-Vincent (Italy). The head international referees in charge of supervising the competition were Bernard Galley and Denis Pettiaux.

For each heat, each broadcaster sent a mixed team of twelve members (six men and six women) from a city or town from its country that competed against each other in a series of games –funny physical games played in outlandish costumes, though none-the-less technically difficult– themed in the specific topic of the episode. After the ten heats, the most successful team from each country competed in the grand final. Each of the episodes was presented by the host broadcaster in its own language. Each of the participating broadcasters had their own presenters who did some on-site presentations for their audience and commented on the competition in their language. Due the complexity of the production, and that each broadcaster had its own personalized coverage, the episodes were filmed first and each broadcaster broadcast them at their convenience later.

The season was won by the team from Vigevano, Italy, being the runner-up the team from Leiria, Portugal.

== Participants ==
Country	Broadcaster	Code	Colour
France	Antenne 2	F	Blue and white
Italy	RAI	I	Light blue
Portugal	RTP	P	Green
San Marino	–	SM	Yellow
Spain	TVE	E	Red
Wales	S4C	GB	Pink

== Heats ==
=== Heat 1 ===
Heat 1 was hosted by RAI at Parco Longo in Vigevano, Italy, was themed about the 1966 film For Love and Gold, and was presented by Ettore Andenna and Feliciana Iaccio.

Place	Country	Town	Points
1	SM	Serravalle	53
2	F	Megeve	49
3	I	Venosa	45
4	GB	Llanidloes	36
5	P	Batalha	34
6	E	Pollença	32

=== Heat 2 ===
Heat 2 was hosted by Antenne 2 at Esplanade de l’Europe in Montpellier, France, was themed about Molière's theatre, and was presented by Georges Beller and Daniela Lumbroso.

Place	Country	Town	Points
1	SM	Chiesanuova	47
2	P	Moura	45
3	E	Las Palmas	43
4	I	Atrani	37
5	F	Montpellier	34
6	GB	Caerfyrddin	31

=== Heat 3 ===
Heat 3 was hosted by TVE at the grounds of Prado del Rey in Pozuelo de Alarcón, Spain, was themed about the circus, and was presented by Daniel Vindel and Isabel Gemio.

Place	Country	Town	Points
1	P	Leiria	56
2	I	Castel Goffredo	53
3	E	Las Rozas	38
4	GB	Wrecsam	31
4	SM	Faetano	31
6	F	Fecamp	25

=== Heat 4 ===
Heat 4 was hosted by RTP at Parque das Abadias in Figueira da Foz, Portugal, was themed about one hundred years of balneario life, and was presented by Eládio Clímaco and Ana do Carmo.

Place	Country	Town	Points
1	P	Figueira da Foz	49
2	F	Epernay	46
3	GB	Aberystwyth	43
4	I	Santa Teresa di Gallura	41
5	SM	Fiorentino	36
6	E	Alicante	32

=== Heat 5 ===
Heat 5 was hosted by S4C at the Padarn Park in Llanberis, United Kingdom, was themed about horror films, and was presented by Nia Chiswell and Iestyn Garlick.

Place	Country	Town	Points
1	GB	Llanberis	55
2	P	Guimarães	50
3	E	Vitoria	38
4	F	Caen	37
5	I	Anzio	29
6	SM	Montegiardino	26

=== Heat 6 ===
Heat 6 was hosted by RAI at Parco Longo in Vigevano, Italy, was themed about Little Red Riding Hood, and was presented by Ettore Andenna and Feliciana Iaccio.

Place	Country	Town	Points
1	I	Vigevano	48
2	P	Azores	45
3	E	León	44
4	SM	Acquaviva	41
5	GB	Aberdare	32
6	F	Cargese	27

=== Heat 7 ===
Heat 7 was hosted by Antenne 2 at Esplanade de l’Europe in Montpellier, France, was themed about the novels of Jules Verne, and was presented by Georges Beller and Daniela Lumbroso.

Place	Country	Town	Points
1	SM	San Marino	48
2	I	Lerici	46
3	E	Granada	45
4	F	Montpellier	39
5	P	Alcobaça	29
6	GB	Caerphilly	27

=== Heat 8 ===
Heat 8 was hosted by RTP at Parque das Abadias in Figueira da Foz, Portugal, was themed about beach games, and was presented by Eládio Clímaco and Ana do Carmo.

Place	Country	Town	Points
1	P	Chaves	51
2	SM	Serravalle	45
3	I	Viterbo	41
3	GB	Rhyl	41
5	F	Aurillac	33
6	E	Salou	21

=== Heat 9 ===
Heat 9 was hosted by TVE at the grounds of Prado del Rey in Pozuelo de Alarcón, Spain, was themed about the history of Madrid, and was presented by Daniel Vindel and Isabel Gemio.

Place	Country	Town	Points
1	E	Madrid	48
2	P	Madeira	47
3	I	Saint-Vincent	38
4	F	Chalon-sur-Saône	37
5	SM	Domagnano	35
6	GB	Casnewydd	31

=== Heat 10 ===
Heat 10 was hosted by S4C at the Padarn Park in Llanberis, United Kingdom, was themed about Gwythyr ap Greidawl, and was presented by Nia Chiswell and Iestyn Garlick.

Place	Country	Town	Points
1	P	Águeda	56
2	E	Jaca	55
3	I	Montesilvano	39
4	SM	Borgo Maggiore	34
5	F	Alfortville	31
6	GB	Caergybi	20

== Final ==
The final round was hosted by RAI at the Perucca stadium in Saint-Vincent, Italy, was themed about the Celts, and was presented by Ettore Andenna and Feliciana Iaccio.

Place	Country	Town	Points
1	I	Vigevano	52
2	P	Leiria	48
3	F	Megeve	46
4	SM	Serravalle	37
5	E	Madrid	29
6	GB	Llanberis	24

== Broadcasts ==
Broadcasters and commentators in participating countries
Country	Broadcaster(s)	Channel(s)	Local presenter(s)/Commentator(s)	Ref.
France	Antenne 2		Georges Beller; Daniela Lumbroso	
Italy	RAI	Raiuno	Ettore Andenna; Feliciana Iaccio	
Portugal	RTP	RTP Canal 1	Eládio Clímaco; Ana do Carmo	
Spain	TVE	La 2	Daniel Vindel	
Wales	S4C	S4C	Nia Chiswell; Iestyn Garlick	
