= Jeux sans frontières season 21 =

Jeux sans frontières
- Season 21
- No. of teams: 6 countries
- Winner: (Spain) Jaca
- Runner-up: (Socialist Federal Republic of Yugoslavia) Bor
- Head referees: Bernard Galley; Denis Pettiaux
- No. of episodes: 9

Release
- Original network: Antenne 2; Raiuno; RTP Canal 1; TVE1; TV Belgrade 1; TV Ljubljana 1; TV Zagreb 1
- Original release: July 1990 – September 1990

Season chronology
- ← Previous; Season 20 Next → Season 22

The 21st season of the international television game show Jeux sans frontières was held in the summer of 1990. Broadcasters from France, Italy, Portugal, San Marino, Spain, and Yugoslavia participated in the competition coordinated by the European Broadcasting Union (EBU). The different heats were hosted by some of the participant broadcasters in locations in their countries such as Bergamo (Italy), Guimarães (Portugal), Toulouse (France), and Vrnjačka Banja (Yugoslavia). The grand final was held in Treviso (Italy). The head international referees in charge of supervising the competition were Bernard Galley and Denis Pettiaux.

For each heat, each broadcaster sent a mixed team of twelve members (six men and six women) from a city or town from its country that competed against each other in a series of games –funny physical games played in outlandish costumes, though none-the-less technically difficult– themed in the specific topic of the episode. After the eight heats, the most successful team from each country competed in the grand final. Each of the episodes was presented by the host broadcaster in its own language. Each of the participating broadcasters had their own presenters who did some on-site presentations for their audience and commented on the competition in their language. Due the complexity of the production, and that each broadcaster had its own personalized coverage, the episodes were filmed first and each broadcaster broadcast them at their convenience later.

The season was won by the team from Jaca, Spain, being the runner-up the team from Bor, Yugoslavia.

== Participants ==
Country	Broadcaster	Code	Colour
France	Antenne 2	F	Blue and white
Italy	RAI	I	Light blue
Portugal	RTP	P	Green
San Marino	–	SM	Yellow
Spain	TVE	E	Red
Yugoslavia	JRT	YU	White

== Heats ==
=== Heat 1 ===
Heat 1 was hosted by RAI at the sports center in Bergamo, Italy, was themed about the history and traditions of the town, and was presented by Claudio Lippi and Feliciana Iaccio.

Place	Country	Town	Points
1	I	Treviso	61
2	P	Moura	45
3	YU	Mali Lošinj	42
4	SM	Acquaviva	37
5	F	Mulhouse	31
6	E	Almagro	14

=== Heat 2 ===
Heat 2 was hosted by TV Belgrade on behalf of JRT at the spa park in Vrnjačka Banja, Yugoslavia, was themed about the history of the spa town, and was presented by Dubravka Marković and Jovan Pavliček.

Place	Country	Town	Points
1	E	Jaca	48
2	P	Águeda	44
3	YU	Vrnjačka Banja	43
4	I	Rieti	39
5	SM	Chiesanuova	32
6	F	Cattenom	29

=== Heat 3 ===
Heat 3 was hosted by RTP at the castle of Guimarães, Portugal, was themed about the history of the town, and was presented by Eládio Clímaco and Ana do Carmo.

Place	Country	Town	Points
1	YU	Bor	54
2	E	Arnedo	45
3	I	Brebbia	40
4	SM	Faetano	38
5	P	Caldas da Rainha	36
6	F	Granville	27

=== Heat 4 ===
Heat 4 was hosted by Antenne 2 at the Place de la Daurade in Toulouse, France, was themed about the history of the town, and was presented by Georges Beller and Marie-Ange Nardi.

Place	Country	Town	Points
1	I	Bergamo	52
2	F	Toulouse	48
3	P	Figueira da Foz	44
4	YU	Skopje	34
5	SM	Montegiardino	33
6	E	Archidona	29

=== Heat 5 ===
Heat 5 was hosted by RAI at the sports center in Bergamo, Italy, was themed about the typical products of the town, and was presented by Claudio Lippi and Feliciana Iaccio.

Place	Country	Town	Points
1	P	Azores	49
1	YU	Trogir	49
3	I	Castiglione delle Stiviere	48
4	SM	Borgo Maggiore	33
5	F	Boulogne-Billancourt	31
6	E	Almagro	22

=== Heat 6 ===
Heat 6 was hosted by TV Belgrade on behalf of JRT at the spa park in Vrnjačka Banja, Yugoslavia, was themed about the spa town, and was presented by Dubravka Marković and Jovan Pavliček.

Place	Country	Town	Points
1	E	Jaca	46
2	F	Levallois-Perret	45
2	P	Madeira	45
4	I	Potenza	40
5	YU	Vrnjačka Banja	38
6	SM	Domagnano	29

=== Heat 7 ===
Heat 7 was hosted by RTP at the castle of Guimarães, Portugal, was themed about the town, and was presented by Eládio Clímaco and Ana do Carmo.

Place	Country	Town	Points
1	I	Cicciano	53
2	P	Guimarães	45
3	YU	Titovo Užice	43
4	E	Arnedo	37
5	SM	Fiorentino	36
6	F	Argenteuil	21

=== Heat 8 ===
Heat 8 was hosted by Antenne 2 at the Place de la Daurade in Toulouse, France, was themed about the future of the town, and was presented by Georges Beller and Marie-Ange Nardi.

Place	Country	Town	Points
1	F	Toulouse	49
2	P	Algarve	42
3	E	Archidona	41
3	I	Noceto	41
5	YU	Budva	39
6	SM	Serravalle	29

== Final ==
The final round was hosted by RAI at Prato della Fiera in Treviso, Italy, was themed about the history and traditions of the town, and was presented by Claudio Lippi et Feliciana Iaccio.

Place	Country	Town	Points
1	E	Jaca	50
2	YU	Bor	49
3	I	Treviso	45
4	F	Toulouse	44
5	P	Azores	43
6	SM	Faetano	26

== Broadcasts ==
Broadcasters and commentators in participating countries
Country	Broadcaster(s)	Channel(s)	Local presenter(s)/Commentator(s)	Ref.
France	Antenne 2		Georges Beller; Marie-Ange Nardi	
Italy	RAI	Raiuno	Claudio Lippi; Feliciana Iaccio	
Portugal	RTP	RTP Canal 1	Eládio Clímaco; Ana do Carmo	
Spain	TVE	TVE1	Daniel Vindel	
Yugoslavia	JRT	TV Belgrade 1	Dubravka Marković; Jovan Pavliček	
Yugoslavia	JRT	TV Ljubljana 1	Unknown	
Yugoslavia	JRT	TV Zagreb 1	Unknown	
