= Jeux sans frontières season 25 =

Jeux sans frontières
- Season 25
- No. of teams: 9 countries
- Winner: (Czech Republic) Česká Třebová
- Runner-up: (Wales) Wrexham
- Head referee: Denis Pettiaux
- No. of episodes: 11

Release
- Original release: July 1994 – September 1994

Season chronology
- ← Previous; Season 24 Next → Season 26

The 25th season of the international television game show Jeux sans frontières was held in the summer of 1994. Broadcasters from the Czech Republic, Greece, Hungary, Italy, Malta, Portugal, Slovenia, Switzerland, and Wales participated in the competition coordinated by the European Broadcasting Union (EBU). The different heats were hosted by some of the participant broadcasters in locations in their countries such as Rome (Italy), Batalha (Portugal), Poros (Greece), Valletta (Malta), Hradec Králové (Czech Republic), Ljubljana (Slovenia), and Pécs (Hungary). The grand final was held in Cardiff (Wales). The head international referee in charge of supervising the competition was Denis Pettiaux.

The season was won by the team from Česká Třebová, Czech Republic, being the runner-up the team from Wrexham, Wales.

== Participants ==
Country	Broadcasters	Code	Colour
Czech Republic	ČT	CZ	Orange
Greece	ERT	GR	Dark Blue
Hungary	MTV	H	Yellow
Italy	RAI	I	Light blue
Malta	PBS	M	White
Portugal	RTP	P	Light green
Slovenia	RTVSLO	SLO	Green
Switzerland	SRG SSR	CH	Pink
Wales	S4C	GB	Red

== Heats ==
=== Heat 1 ===
Heat 1 was hosted by RTP in Batalha, Portugal.

Place	Country	Town	Points
1	P	Vila Real	83
2	H	Mosonmagyaróvár	81
3	CH	Airolo	79
4	CZ	Bruntál	76
5	SLO	Rogaška Slatina	67
6	GB	Llandeilo	66
7	GR	Ioannina	65
8	M	Valletta	54
9	I	Sestriere	53

=== Heat 2 ===
Heat 2 was hosted by PBS in Valletta, Malta.

Place	Country	Town	Points
1	H	Százhalombatta	80
2	CZ	Ostrov nad Ohří	78
3	CH	Mendrisio	74
4	P	Vila Nova de Famalicão	73
5	GR	Thessaloniki	72
6	SLO	Kanal ob Soči	71
7	I	Sassari	68
8	M	Birkirkara	45
9	GB	Bangor	38

=== Heat 3 ===
Heat 3 was hosted by ČT in Hradec Králové, Czech Republic.

Place	Country	Town	Points
1	H	Cegléd	86
2	CZ	Hradec Králové	83
3	CH	Centovalli	76
4	P	Loulé	73
5	SLO	Ljutomer	70
6	GB	Bala	61
7	GR	Kavala	60
8	M	Żurrieq	54
9	I	Noto	49

=== Heat 4 ===
Heat 4 was hosted by MTV in Pécs, Hungary.

Place	Country	Town	Points
1	H	Pécs	92
2	CZ	Česká Třebová	86
3	P	Mirandela	75
4	CH	Valle Verzasca	67
5	SLO	Krško	63
6	GB	Rhyl	61
7	I	Rosolini	59
8	GR	Rhodes	58
9	M	Paola	48

=== Heat 5 ===
Heat 5 was hosted by RAI in Rome, Italy.

Place	Country	Town	Points
1	H	Salgótarján	90
2	CH	Olivone	85
3	P	Coimbra	81
4	SLO	Ajdovščina	76
5	CZ	Brno	67
6	I	Grottaferrata	61
7	GR	Agios Nikolaos	60
8	M	Mosta	45
9	GB	Caerdydd	40

=== Heat 6 ===
Heat 6 was hosted by RTP in Batalha, Portugal.

Place	Country	Town	Points
1	SLO	Bled	88
2	GB	Llangollen	86
3	H	Győr	71
4	CH	Bellinzona	70
4	CZ	Kyjov	70
4	P	Batalha	70
7	GR	Kerkyra	53
8	I	Policoro	51
9	M	Mdina	47

=== Heat 7 ===
Heat 7 was hosted by PBS in Valletta, Malta.

Place	Country	Town	Points
1	GB	Abertawe	85
1	P	Setúbal	85
3	CZ	Příbram	78
4	SLO	Mengeš	71
5	CH	Giubiasco	68
6	H	Nagykanizsa	62
7	I	Porto Tolle	60
8	GR	Preveza	57
9	M	Birgu	51

=== Heat 8 ===
Heat 8 was hosted by ERT in Poros, Greece.

Place	Country	Town	Points
1	P	Águeda	85
2	I	Comacchio	82
3	CZ	Lipnice nad Sázavou	78
4	GR	Poros	77
5	CH	Bassa Mesolcina	69
6	H	Sátoraljaújhely	65
7	SLO	Podčetrtek	55
8	M	Sliema	54
9	GB	Pontypridd	53

=== Heat 9 ===
Heat 9 was hosted by RTVSLO in Ljubljana, Slovenia.

Place	Country	Town	Points
1	GB	Wrexham	87
2	SLO	Ljubljana	75
3	P	Moura	74
4	CZ	Jihlava	71
5	H	Kalocsa	69
6	CH	Valle Onsernone	67
7	GR	Argostoli	66
7	I	Arezzo	66
9	M	Mellieħa	42

=== Heat 10 ===
Heat 10 was hosted by RAI in Rome, Italy.

Place	Country	Town	Points
1	I	Valle d' Aosta	91
2	SLO	Nova Gorica	87
3	P	Paços de Ferreira	80
4	CH	Valposchiavo	77
5	H	Hódmezővásárhely	75
6	GB	Llanfairpwllgwyngyll	60
7	CZ	Těrlicko	54
8	GR	Mytilene	46
8	M	Gozo	46

=== Qualifiers ===
The teams which qualified from each country to the final were:

Country	Town	Place won	Points won
CH	Olivone	2	85
CZ	Česká Třebová	2	86
GB	Wrexham	1	87
GR	Poros	4	77
H	Pécs	1	92
I	Valle d' Aosta	1	91
M	Valletta	8	54
P	Setúbal	1	85
SLO	Bled	1	88

== Final ==
The final round was hosted by S4C in Cardiff, Wales.

Place	Country	Town	Points
1	CZ	Česká Třebová	90
2	GB	Wrexham	89
3	CH	Olivone	74
4	I	Valle d' Aosta	66
5	GR	Poros	65
6	SLO	Bled	61
7	H	Pécs	56
8	P	Setúbal	52
9	M	Valletta	51
