= Jeux sans frontières season 28 =

Jeux sans frontières
- Season 28
- No. of teams: 8 countries
- Winner: (Portugal) Amadora
- Runner-up: (Italy) Val di Sole
- Location: Budapest, Hungary
- Finals venue: Lisbon, Portugal
- Head referee: Denis Pettiaux
- No. of episodes: 10

Release
- Original release: June 1997 – September 1997

Season chronology
- ← Previous; Season 27 Next → Season 29

The 28th season of the international television game show Jeux sans frontières was held in the summer of 1997. Broadcasters from France, Greece, Hungary, Italy, the Netherlands, Portugal, Slovenia, and Switzerland participated in the competition coordinated by the European Broadcasting Union (EBU). MTV hosted all heats at the Óbuda Esplanade in Budapest (Hungary). RTP hosted the final in Lisbon, Portugal. The head international referee in charge of supervising the competition was Denis Pettiaux.

The season was won by the team from Amadora, Portugal, being the runner-up the team from Val di Sole, Italy.

== Participants ==
Country	Broadcasters	Code	Colour
France	France 2	F	Light blue
Greece	ERT	GR	Dark blue
Hungary	MTV	H	Yellow
Italy	RAI	I	White
Netherlands	TROS	NL	Orange
Portugal	RTP	P	Green
Slovenia	RTVSLO	SLO	Pink
Switzerland	SRG SSR	CH	Red

== Heats ==
All heats were hosted by MTV at the Óbuda Esplanade in Budapest, Hungary.

=== Heat 1 ===
Place	Country	Town	Points
1	H	Gyöngyös	91
2	CH	Vedeggio	65
3	SLO	Lasko	64
4	P	Aveiro	58
5	I	Castel Goffredo	54
6	NL	Maarssen	40
7	F	Lyon	36
8	GR	Tinos	31

=== Heat 2 ===
Place	Country	Town	Points
1	P	Amadora	72
2	H	Pápa	70
3	SLO	Bovec	63
4	GR	Katastari–Zakynthos	55
5	F	Troyes	51
6	I	Otranto	47
7	NL	Almere	45
8	CH	Chiasso	43

=== Heat 3 ===
Place	Country	Town	Points
1	SLO	Sentjernej	80
2	CH	Schattdorf	75
3	H	Belváros - Lipótváros	64
4	GR	Skiathos	60
5	P	Moura	54
6	NL	Loon op Zand	50
7	I	Laigueglia	35
8	F	Poitiers	31

=== Heat 4 ===
Place	Country	Town	Points
1	H	Komárom	67
2	F	La Clusaz	65
3	P	Lamego	58
3	SLO	Vuzenica	58
5	GR	Hania	56
6	I	Portici	52
7	NL	Vlissingen	51
8	CH	Val Bregaglia	48

=== Heat 5 ===
Place	Country	Town	Points
1	P	Vila Franca de Xira	68
2	SLO	Ormož	67
3	CH	Coldrerio	60
4	NL	Laarbeek	57
5	F	Biarritz	54
6	H	Gyula	50
7	GR	Agrinio	48
8	I	Belmonte Mezzagno	41

=== Heat 6 ===
Place	Country	Town	Points
1	NL	Heerlen	76
2	H	Szarvas	72
3	I	Courmayeur	64
4	CH	Faido	55
5	SLO	Briše	54
6	P	Bragança	53
7	F	Avignon	40
8	GR	Leros	35

=== Heat 7 ===
Place	Country	Town	Points
1	H	Érd	72
2	I	Val di Sole	68
3	P	Felgueiras	64
4	SLO	Trzic	58
5	GR	Patras	51
6	F	Orléans	48
6	NL	Raalte	48
8	CH	Lago di Lugano	33

=== Heat 8 ===
Place	Country	Town	Points
1	NL	Zandvoort	68
2	GR	Xanthi	65
3	CH	Ticino	60
3	H	Tiszaújváros	60
5	F	Cannes	52
6	P	Viseu	51
7	SLO	Kranj	46
8	I	Arzachena	32

=== Heat 9 ===
Place	Country	Town	Points
1	P	Paredes	66
2	I	Norcia	65
3	SLO	Majsperk	59
4	H	Eger	58
5	GR	Edessa	55
6	CH	Brissago	52
7	F	Strasbourg	50
8	NL	IJsselstein	46

=== Qualifiers ===
The teams which qualified from each country to the final were:

Country	Town	Place won	Points won
F	La Clusaz	2	65
GR	Xanthi	2	65
H	Gyöngyös	1	91
I	Val di Sole	2	68
NL	Heerlen	1	76
P	Amadora	1	72
SLO	Sentjernej	1	80
CH	Schattdorf	2	75

== Final ==
The final was hosted by RTP in Lisbon, Portugal.

Place	Country	Town	Points
1	P	Amadora	68
2	I	Val di Sole	66
3	CH	Schattdorf	65
4	H	Gyöngyös	64
5	NL	Heerlen	63
6	GR	Xanthi	40
7	SLO	Sentjernej	38
8	F	La Clusaz	34
