= Jeux sans frontières season 29 =

Jeux sans frontières
- Season 29
- No. of teams: 7 countries
- Winner: (Hungary) Százhalombatta
- Runner-up: (Greece) Komotini
- Location: Trento, Italy
- Head referee: Denis Pettiaux
- No. of episodes: 10

Release
- Original release: June 1998 – September 1998

Season chronology
- ← Previous; Season 28 Next → Season 30

The 29th season of the international television game show Jeux sans frontières was held in the summer of 1998. Broadcasters from France, Greece, Hungary, Italy, the Netherlands, Portugal, and Switzerland participated in the competition coordinated by the European Broadcasting Union (EBU). RAI hosted all heats and the final at the grounds of the Palazzo delle Albere in Trento (Italy). The head international referee in charge of supervising the competition was Denis Pettiaux.

The season was won by Százhalombatta, Hungary, being the runner-up the team from Komotini, Grece.

== Participants ==
Country	Broadcasters	Code	Colour
France	France 2	F	Light blue
Greece	ERT	GR	Dark blue
Hungary	MTV	H	Yellow
Italy	RAI	I	White
Netherlands	TROS	NL	Orange
Portugal	RTP	P	Green
Switzerland	SRG SSR	CH	Red

== Heats ==
=== Heat 1 ===
Place	Country	Town	Points
1	P	Lamego	86
2	NL	Vlieland	76
3	I	Borgosesia	74
4	GR	Hydra	65
5	H	Eger	61
6	CH	Stabio	59
7	F	Sainte-Maxime	43

=== Heat 2 ===
Place	Country	Town	Points
1	I	Val Gardena	88
2	NL	Haarlemmermeer	72
3	H	Tiszaújváros	66
4	P	Amadora	63
4	F	Perros-Guirec	63
6	GR	Ioannina	60
7	CH	Ascona	55

=== Heat 3 ===
Place	Country	Town	Points
1	P	Águeda	80
2	H	Gyöngyös	77
3	GR	Nea Philadelphia	76
3	CH	Monte Generoso	76
5	F	La Grande-Motte	60
6	I	Realmonte	48
7	NL	Breda	42

=== Heat 4 ===
Place	Country	Town	Points
1	F	La Clusaz	74
2	GR	Limni Evias	72
3	P	Vila Franca de Xira	71
4	CH	Martigny	70
5	NL	Alphen aan den Rijn	69
6	H	Budapest XVIII. District	62
7	I	Bibione	53

=== Heat 5 ===
Place	Country	Town	Points
1	P	Torres Vedras	80
2	F	Cambrai	77
2	CH	Regione San Gottardo	77
4	H	Miskolc	70
5	NL	Meppel	65
6	GR	Elefsina	54
7	I	Valtopina	52

=== Heat 6 ===
Place	Country	Town	Points
1	GR	Komotini	83
2	I	Val di Sole	79
3	NL	Heerlen	70
4	P	Oeiras	68
5	H	Belváros - Lipótváros	65
6	F	Royan	62
7	CH	Novazzano	42

=== Heat 7 ===
Place	Country	Town	Points
1	P	Peniche	88
2	GR	Katastari-Zakynthos	81
3	CH	Bellinzona	69
4	NL	Hilversum	64
5	H	Hajdúszoboszló	63
6	I	Torre Annunziata	53
7	F	Mâcon	50

=== Heat 8 ===
Place	Country	Town	Points
1	H	Százhalombatta	91
2	CH	Val Poschiavo	78
3	I	Mondragone	69
4	F	Périgueux	62
5	GR	Chios	56
6	P	Sintra	52
7	NL	De Marne	51

=== Heat 9 ===
Place	Country	Town	Points
1	H	Budapest XII. District	80
2	P	Mafra	79
3	CH	Val di Blenio	71
3	GR	Tripoli	71
5	NL	Roermond	66
6	I	Catanzaro	54
7	F	Nevers	36

=== Qualifiers ===
The teams which qualified from each country to the final were:

Country	Town	Place won	Points won
F	La Clusaz	1	74
GR	Komotini	1	83
H	Százhalombatta	1	91
I	Val Gardena	1	88
NL	Vlieland	2	76
P	Peniche	1	88
CH	Val Poschiavo	2	78

== Final ==
Place	Country	Town	Points
1	H	Százhalombatta	79
2	GR	Komotini	74
3	NL	Vlieland	67
4	CH	Val Poschiavo	66
5	I	Val Gardena	61
5	F	La Clusaz	61
7	P	Peniche	54
