= Jeux sans frontières season 30 =

Jeux sans frontières
- Season 30
- No. of teams: 6 countries
- Winner: (Italy) Bolzano
- Runner-up: (Greece) Patras
- Location: Isola di Capo Rizzuto, Italy
- Head referee: Denis Pettiaux

Release
- Original release: June 1999 – August 1999

Season chronology
- ← Previous; Season 29

The 30th season of the international television game show Jeux sans frontières was held in the summer of 1999. Broadcasters from France, Greece, Hungary, Italy, Slovenia, and Switzerland participated in the competition coordinated by the European Broadcasting Union (EBU). RAI hosted all heats and the final in front of the Aragonese castle of Le Castella in Isola di Capo Rizzuto (Italy). The head international referee in charge of supervising the competition was Denis Pettiaux.

The season was won by Bolzano, Italy, being the runner-up the team from Patras, Grece. To date, this is the last edition of the competition.

== Participants ==
Country	Broadcasters	Code	Colour
France	France 2	F	Light blue
Greece	ERT	GR	Dark blue
Hungary	MTV	H	Yellow
Italy	RAI	I	White
Slovenia	RTVSLO	SLO	Green
Switzerland	SRG SSR	CH	Red

== Heats ==
=== Heat 1 ===
Place	Country	Town	Points
1	CH	Tre Valli	52
2	H	Gyöngyös	51
3	F	Gap	44
4	SLO	Tržič	43
5	GR	Katerini	40
6	I	Reggio Calabria	26

=== Heat 2 ===
Place	Country	Town	Points
1	SLO	Bohinj	56
2	I	Bolzano	49
3	H	Budapest XVIII. District	43
4	F	Rouen	37
5	CH	Locarno	35
6	GR	Orestiada	28

=== Heat 3 ===
Place	Country	Town	Points
1	H	Budapest XII. District	49
2	F	Martigues	46
3	SLO	Rogatec	43
4	I	Caorle	42
5	CH	Capriasca	40
6	GR	Andros	25

=== Heat 4 ===
Place	Country	Town	Points
1	CH	Chiasso	54
2	H	Debrecen	49
3	SLO	Kranj	46
4	I	Valle d'Aosta	45
5	F	Villard-de-Lans	37
6	GR	Sapes	30

=== Heat 5 ===
Place	Country	Town	Points
1	SLO	Šentjernej	56
2	CH	Bosco/Gurin	49
3	H	Belváros - Lipótváros	44
4	GR	Xanthi	38
5	I	Pagani	34
6	F	Tarbes	31

=== Heat 6 ===
Place	Country	Town	Points
1	SLO	Maribor	57
2	GR	Patras	50
3	H	Tiszaújváros	46
4	F	Mulhouse	41
5	I	Parco del Nera	30
6	CH	San Bernardino	28

=== Heat 7 ===
Place	Country	Town	Points
1	CH	Lugano	48
2	SLO	Kranjska Gora	47
3	GR	Edessa	43
4	F	Brive-la-Gaillarde	39
5	H	Szentendre	38
6	I	Grecia Salentina	34

=== Qualifiers ===
The teams which qualified from each country to the final were:

Country	Town	Place won	Points won
F	Martigues	2	46
GR	Patras	2	50
H	Budapest XII. District	1	49
I	Bolzano	2	49
SLO	Maribor	1	57
CH	Chiasso	1	54

== Final ==
Place	Country	Town	Points
1	I	Bolzano	48
2	GR	Patras	47
3	H	Budapest XII. District	45
4	SLO	Maribor	41
5	F	Martigues	40
6	CH	Chiasso	36
