= Interneige season 11 =

Interneige
- Season 11
- No. of teams: 4 countries
- Winner: (Czechoslovakia) Nové Město na Moravě
- Runner-up: (Italy) Santa Caterina di Valfurva
- Head referee: Denis Pettiaux
- No. of episodes: 6

Release
- Original release: January 1992 – February 1992

The 11th season of the international television game show Interneige, the winter version of Jeux sans frontières, was held in 1992 with the title Jeux sans frontières d’hiver 1992. Broadcasters from Czechoslovakia, France, Italy, and Switzerland participated in the competition coordinated by the European Broadcasting Union (EBU). The different heats were hosted by RAI in Santa Caterina Valfurva, Italy, while the semi-final and final were hosted by ČST in Prague, Czechoslovakia.

The results shown here are for the winter series which was filmed in December 1991 and January 1992 and broadcast during January and February 1992.

== Participants ==
Country	Broadcaster	Code	Colour
Czechoslovakia	ČST	CS	Orange
France	Antenne 2	F	Blue
Italy	RAI	I	White
Switzerland	SRG SSR	CH	Red

== Heats ==
Heats were hosted by RAI in Santa Caterina Valfurva, Italy.

=== Heat 1 ===
Place	Country	Town	Points
1	CH	Verbier	30
2	F	Megève	29
3	CS	Třebíč	28
4	I	Bergamo	26

=== Heat 2 ===
Place	Country	Town	Points
1	CH	Canton du Jura	35
2	I	Val di Gressoney	33
3	F	Serre-Chevalier	25
4	CS	Rožnov pod Radhoštěm	19

=== Heat 3 ===
Place	Country	Town	Points
1	CH	Charmey	33
2	F	Avoriaz	29
3	I	Aprica	27
4	CS	Nové Město na Moravě	23

=== Heat 4 ===
Place	Country	Town	Points
1	I	Santa Caterina di Valfurva	33
2	CH	Villars-sur-Ollon	29
3	F	Luz-Ardiden	27
4	CS	Prostějov	23

=== Qualifiers ===
Country	Town	Place won	Points won
CH	Canton du Jura	1	35
CH	Charmey	1	33
CS	Třebíč	3	28
CS	Nové Město na Moravě	4	23
F	Megève	2	29
F	Avoriaz	2	37
I	Santa Caterina di Valfurva	1	33
I	Val di Gressoney	2	33

== Semi-final ==
The semi-final was hosted by ČST at Sportovní hala in Prague, Czechoslovakia.

Country	Town	Better positions
CH	Canton du Jura	5
CH	Charmey	4
CS	Nové Město na Moravě	6
CS	Třebíč	3
F	Megève	4
F	Avoriaz	5
I	Santa Caterina di Valfurva	5
I	Val di Gressoney	4

General classification

Place	Country	Country	Points
1	CS	Czechoslovakia	25
2	F	France	24
3	CH	Switzerland	22
3	I	Italy	22

== Final ==
The final was hosted by ČST at Sportovní hala in Prague, Czechoslovakia.

Place	Country	Country	Points
1	CS	Nové Město na Moravě	30
2	I	Santa Caterina di Valfurva	27
3	CH	Canton du Jura	26
4	F	Avoriaz	22
