= Going, Going, Gone (game show) =

British game show (1995–1998)

- Genre: Game show
- Created by: Bazal Productions
- Presented by: Andy Craig (1995–97); Stuart Hall (1997–98)
- Country of origin: United Kingdom
- Original language: English
- No. of series: 3
- No. of episodes: 146

Production
- Running time: 25 minutes
- Production companies: Bazal and BBC Scotland

Original release
- Network: BBC2
- Release: 16 October 1995 – 11 March 1998

Going, Going, Gone is a British game show that aired on BBC2 from 16 October 1995 to 11 March 1998. It was originally hosted by Andy Craig for the first two series and then hosted by Stuart Hall for the third series.

== Format ==
The programme's format was simple: three celebrities described an antique and gave it a valuation. One is telling the truth and the other two are lying. The two contestants had to guess which description was true, and were awarded points if they guessed correctly. A film of the real auction would be shown with the item described being bid for.

In the final round, both players 'bid' for an item by trying to guess the value that the antique went for with the person finishing with the nearest price winning the bonus points. The winner would take home an antique as a prize and the loser took home a 'booby prize' of a flying duck, the show's motif, mounted on a plaque. In fact, every contestant really wanted the flying duck.

== Transmissions ==
Series	Start date	End date	Episodes
1	16 October 1995	8 December 1995	18
2	2 September 1996	15 August 1997	48
3	1 September 1997	11 March 1998	80
