= Jeux sans frontières =

International television game show (1965–1999)

- Title card
- Genre: Game show
- Created by: Guy Lux; Claude Savarit
- Based on: Intervilles
- Judges: See below
- Theme music composer: Jacques Revaux
- No. of seasons: 30 editions

Production
- Production location: Held around Europe
- Production company: European Broadcasting Union

Original release
- Release: 26 May 1965 – 7 September 1982
- Release: 1 July 1988 – 23 September 1999

Related
- It's a Knockout

Jeux sans frontières (pronounced [ʒø sɑ̃ fʁɔ̃tjɛʁ]; "Games Without Borders" in French) was an international television competition organised by the European Broadcasting Union (EBU) for thirty seasons, from 1965 to 1999, between members of the union who participated representing their countries. Broadcasters sent mixed teams that competed against each other in a series of games, usually funny physical games played in outlandish costumes though nonetheless technically difficult, with the most successful teams of the season from each country competing in a grand final. Each episode was hosted by one of the participating broadcasters at a location in its country and was themed around a specific topic.

The show was created for the EBU by Guy Lux and Claude Savarit from the Office de Radiodiffusion Télévision Française (ORTF) as an international version of their own show Intervilles, which was first broadcast in 1962 in France. In non-French-speaking countries, Jeux sans frontières has alternative titles in the corresponding local languages. (Note: German: Spiel Ohne Grenzen; Dutch: Spel Zonder Grenzen; Italian: Giochi Senza Frontiere; Serbo-Croatian: Igre Bez Granica, Игре Без Граница; Slovene: Igre Brez Meja; Spanish: Juegos Sin Fronteras; Portuguese: Jogos Sem Fronteiras; Greek: Παιχνίδια Χωρίς Σύνορα, romanized: Paichnídia Chorís Sýnora; Welsh: Gemau Heb Ffiniau; Hungarian: Játék Határok Nélkül; Czech: Hry Bez Hranic.) It is also widely known in English as It's a Knockout, the title of the BBC's domestic version that was its national selection for the international competition. The show spawned a winter version held in ski resorts, and single-episode Christmas specials.

== History ==
The idea of the show came from French President Charles de Gaulle, whose wish was that French and German youth would meet in a series of games to reinforce the friendship between the two countries. In 1965, Guy Lux and Claude Savarit from the Office de Radiodiffusion Télévision Française (ORTF), and creators of Intervilles, spread this idea to other broadcasters within the European Broadcasting Union (EBU). Teams representing France, West Germany, Belgium, and Italy took part in the first edition of the show held that same year with the title Inter Nations Games.

At the height of its popularity, Jeux sans frontières was watched by 110 million viewers across Europe. The original series ended in 1982. It was revived in 1988, with a different mix of countries taking part. In its later editions, it was typically hosted by smaller broadcasters, with the notable exception of Italy's RAI, which hosted three editions with a fixed location in 1996, 1998, and 1999.

== Format ==
In its original conception, teams from Belgium, France, West Germany, and Italy competed each week in head-to-head competition between two cities or towns from two of the four competing countries. There would be sports events, but also studio-based quizzes each week. Eventually, all teams would have competed against each other and the teams with the highest cumulative points for each country from the series would meet in two semi-finals, with the two winners meeting in the final. The first series in 1965 ended in a tie between Belgian town Ciney and French town St. Amand. A similar format followed in the longer 1966 series, with more towns competing from each of the four countries.

The more familiar format began in 1967, when teams from Great Britain and Switzerland joined the competition and towns only appeared once in the series heats, with each heat being hosted by one of the participant broadcasters in its country, culminating in a grand final. The quiz element was abandoned and the games became more comical (though none-the-less technically difficult), and began to be played in outlandish costumes (often large foam latex suits) with the contestants competing to complete bizarre tasks in funny games. The teams could not choose which of their members played each game. A draw was held to determine the game participants, who were then allowed to rehearse the game once ahead of the broadcast recording. Each of the teams received a score for each game, and the games were umpired by one or two "international" judges (supported by referees from the participant countries), with the winner of each heat being awarded a silver trophy. The two judges/referees who became synonymous with the series were Swiss nationals Gennaro Olivieri and Guido Pancaldi, who were together on the show from 1966 to 1982. Pancaldi returned for the revived series in 1988.

=== Weather conditions ===
Typically, the programmes were staged outdoors during the European summer, although occasionally the competition took place indoors, such as the Dutch heat in 1971, staged at the Ahoy Sports Arena in Rotterdam, Netherlands. Historic market squares or the grounds of famous buildings were often used for the settings, although the surrounds of swimming pools or quay sides for lakes or the sea were very commonly used. The outdoor settings meant that bad weather could often have an impact on the competition, but the games took place regardless. Infamously, a freak storm suddenly hit the 1970 Grand Final staged in the Verona Amphitheatre, leading to the unprotected audience having to flee from the torrential rain and the presenters being stranded without protection. However, the show continued.

=== Grand final ===
The series culminated in a grand final, with the most successful team from each country in the series participating. Each finalist would qualify by winning their heat. If a country won more than one heat, the highest scoring winning team for that country would go to the final. Any country that had not won a heat would be represented by the highest scoring team that placed second. Occasionally, this meant that a team with a higher score, but who had finished lower than second, would be displaced by a lower-scoring team that had achieved a second place. In the rare event that none of the country's teams had achieved a win or second place in any heat (such as GB in 1967, France in 1968 or Portugal in 1979), the highest-scoring team regardless of place would participate in the final.

=== Heats ===
Each participating broadcaster hosted one heat of the games in its country, with a rotation as to which of them hosted the grand final. The winner of the grand final would receive a gold trophy, with the runner-up receiving silver and the third-placed team bronze. It was not uncommon for countries to win the grand final with a team that had not won their heat or indeed for countries to win that had not won any heats at all. The Swiss won the grand final in both 1972 and 1974, the Germans in 1977, the Italians in 1978, the Portuguese in 1980 and the British in 1981, all with teams that had finished second in their heats and with none of their teams winning any heats at all. Portugal won the 1980 series trophy without ever having previously won any heats at all in either of their two series to date. The Swiss were twice series winners in 1972 and 1974 despite not winning a single heat in any series for four consecutive series from 1971 to 1974.

=== Changes in countries competing ===
Only Belgium and Italy competed in the original series from start to finish (1965–1982). France participated in the 1968 series, but due to industrial action with French television, they were unable to broadcast any of the series domestically and had to cancel hosting their designated heat. West Germany hosted two heats that season in place of the French edition. With the strike continuing, no French teams participated in the 1969 series. Liechtenstein participated in the series once, replacing the Swiss for the seventh and final heat in the 1976 series, designated as FL rather than CH for the episode. It had been agreed that, should the team from Liechtenstein win their heat, they would be allowed to compete in the Grand Final alongside the best Swiss team. This proved immaterial when Liechtenstein finished fourth of the seven teams in the heat. A team from Derry represented the UK in the German heat of the 1978 series and were designated as NI rather than GB for that episode.

Dutch TV (who joined the competition for the 1970 series) became the first broadcaster to permanently withdraw from the competition at the end of the 1977 series, having never won the series final. Flemish TV in Belgium carried all the series live, whereas Dutch TV recorded the episodes for later transmission (as did many others). Ratings were thus very low in the Netherlands as most viewers had already watched the show with Dutch commentary live from Flemish TV earlier. The Dutch were replaced in the series by Yugoslavia from 1978, who likewise were never the series champions. Portugal joined in 1979, but West Germany left the competition after the 1980 series due to falling ratings. It was agreed to end the contest before the commencement of the 1982 series, which ended with the first outright series win for original participant country Belgium, but it was later revived with a different set of competing countries in 1988.

Some episodes started being produced and broadcast in colour beginning in 1968, but it was not until the 1970 series that the entire series was produced in colour. However, some broadcasters, notably the French and Italians, continued to broadcast the episodes domestically in monochrome for many years, despite producing their own episode in colour. French TV began showing the entire series in colour in 1974, followed by Italy in 1976.

=== Presentation and marketing ===
Each heat was presented almost exclusively in the language of the host broadcaster, necessitating commentators explaining and describing the games and state of play to their domestic audiences. This format made the episodes difficult to sell outside of the participants, offering few opportunities to recoup the programme costs from international sales (although the format itself was licensed to many countries). From the late 1970s the BBC was charged with packaging the episodes for international sale including the English/British commentary. This encouraged sales in English speaking countries leading to broadcasts around the world. In some cases, the BBC would add a pre-show introduction from host Stuart Hall and would often trim the show's length from the broadcast version. Some episodes were occasionally cut to one hour editions for international sale.

=== Scoring ===
Points were given for each game based on the ranking of the teams. For example, if there were six teams playing the game, the winner would get six points, with five for the second etc. Each team had to miss one game per episode, but all teams always played the final game. A joker could be played once by each team, which doubled their score for that game. The 'Fil Rouge' round was played individually by each team and after the 1969 series, no joker could be played on that element, although prior to 1970 jokers could be played on the 'Fil Rouge' and until the end of the 1971 series, jokers could also be played on the final game. This meant there were more points available for that game and many countries thus saved their jokers for the final game. The rules were changed from 1972 onwards, forbidding jokers on the last game. Belgium hosted the first heat of the 1972 series, but saved their joker for the final game. When the team captain presented it to the referees at the final game's start, they were told it was not permissible and thus for this heat, Belgium were unable to play their joker at all; the only time any team's joker was not contested. The Belgian team of Spa were too far behind the leading teams for the bonus joker points to have had any impact on the heat winners. With the increase in the number of teams to eight from the 1979 series on, the joker system was changed. Teams had to win the game to get a bonus of six points if they played their joker, with four points for finishing second and two points for finishing third. If they failed to finish in the top three for the game, there were no bonus joker points earned. The 'Fil Rouge' format was changed in 1981 so that all teams competed together in four repetitions of the game, with different team members in each repetition. The teams retained their best score/time from each of the four repetitions to determine the points after the fourth repetition.

=== Judges and referees ===
- (Switzerland) Gennaro Olivieri (1965–1982)
- (Switzerland) Guido Pancaldi (1966–1989)
- (United Kingdom) Arthur Ellis (1971–1982)
- Nenad Romano (1979–1982)
- (United Kingdom) Mike Swann (1988–1989)
- Bernard Galley (1990–1991)
- (Belgium) Denis Pettiaux (1990–1999)
- Nikos Mperedimas (1993)
- Irini Kamperidiou (1994)
- (Hungary) Lehel Németh (1993–1995, 1999)
- Babis Ioanidis (1995–1999)
- (Hungary) Orsolya Hovorka (1996–1998)
- (Slovenia) Lea Vodušek (1996–1997, 1999)
- (Italy) Carlo Pegoraro (1996, 1998–1999)
- (Netherlands) Beertje van Beers (1997)

== Participants ==
Between 1965 and 1999, broadcasters from twenty countries participated in Jeux sans frontières during its thirty seasons:

Code	Country	Broadcaster	Years of participation	Editions	Finale wins	Heat wins
I	Italy	RAI	1965–1982, 1988–1999	30	4 (1970, 1978, 1991, 1999)	33
F	France	ORTF, Antenne 2, France 2	1965–1968, 1970–1982, 1988–1992, 1997–1999	25	3 (1965, 1975, 1979)	20
CH	Switzerland	SRG SSR	1967–1982, 1992–1999	24	2 (1972, 1974)	24
B	Belgium	BRT, RTBF	1965–1982, 1988–1989	20	2 (1965, 1982)	28
D	West Germany	ARD	1965–1980	16	6 (1966, 1967, 1968, 1969, 1976, 1977)	31
GB (Note: When a team from Derry represented Great Britain, they were identified as 'NI' for Northern Ireland rather than GB.)	United Kingdom	BBC	1967–1982	16	4 (1969, 1971, 1973, 1981)	12
P	Portugal	RTP	1979–1982, 1988–1998	15	5 (1980, 1981, 1988, 1989, 1997)	37
NL	Netherlands	NCRV, TROS	1970–1977, 1997–1998	10	0	13
H	Hungary	MTV	1993–1999	7	3 (1993, 1996, 1998)	15
GR	Greece	ERT	1993–1999	7	0	3
YU	(Socialist Federal Republic of Yugoslavia) Yugoslavia	JRT	1978–1982, 1990	6	0	9
E	Spain	TVE	1988, 1990–1992	4	1 (1990)	4
SLO	Slovenia	RTVSLO	1994, 1996–1997, 1999	4	0	8
GB / C	Wales (Note: Wales participated from 1991 to 1994 on behalf of the United Kingdom, and were identified by the code GB in mainland Europe and by C (Cymru, the Welsh name for Wales) in Wales itself. Welsh was the transmission language of the participating broadcaster (S4C).)	S4C	1991–1994	4	0	4
CZ	Czech Republic	ČT	1993–1995	3	2 (1994, 1995)	4
SM	San Marino	RAI	1989–1991	3	0	4
M	Malta	PBS Malta	1994–1995	2	0	0 (Best: 3rd)
CS	Czechoslovakia	ČST	1992 (Note: Czechoslovakia participated in 1992 with Czech teams only; no Slovak teams participated that year.)	1	1 (1992)	2
FL	Liechtenstein (Note: Liechtenstein participated in 1976, replacing Switzerland in one single heat, and thus using the code FL (instead of CH).)	TSI	1976	1	0	0 (Best: 4th)
TU	Tunisia	ERTT	1992	1	0	0 (Best: 2nd)

Each country was assigned a unique colour which was used on its teams' uniforms and equipment. In the original series which ended in 1982, the colours were: Belgium – Yellow; Germany – Light Blue; Great Britain – Red; Italy – Dark Blue; Yugoslavia – White. France were originally assigned Purple, but this changed to Green after 1976. Switzerland were assigned Light Brown, but during the 1979 series, they switched to Red and White combined, confusing their teams with the British participants, necessitating returning to Light Brown in subsequent years, but again, still dressed in red and white for certain heats. The Netherlands were assigned Orange, but when the country left the series after 1977, the colour was reassigned to Portugal from 1979.

== Editions ==
Season	Year	Final host town/city	Winner	Runner-up	Third place
1	1965	(Belgium) Ciney (France) Saint-Amand-les-Eaux	(Belgium) Ciney (France) Saint-Amand-les-Eaux	No runner-up	No third place
2	1966	(West Germany) Eichstätt (Belgium) Jambes	(West Germany) Eichstätt	(Belgium) Jambes	No third place
3	1967	(West Germany) Kohlscheid	(West Germany) Bardenberg	(France) Nogent-sur-Marne	(United Kingdom) Cheltenham Spa (Italy) Montecatini Terme
4	1968	(Belgium) Brussels	(West Germany) Osterholz-Scharmbeck	(Switzerland) Stans	(France) Vannes
5	1969	(United Kingdom) Blackpool	(United Kingdom) Shrewsbury (West Germany) Wolfsburg	No runner-up	(Belgium) Brugge-Zeebrugge
6	1970	(Italy) Verona	(Italy) Como	(Netherlands) Alphen aan den Rijn	(West Germany) Radevormwald
7	1971	(West Germany) Essen	(United Kingdom) Blackpool	(Netherlands) Alphen aan den Rijn	(Switzerland) Willisau
8	1972	(Switzerland) Lausanne	(Switzerland) La Chaux-de-Fonds	(Italy) Città di Castello (Netherlands) Venray	No third place
9	1973	(France) Paris	(United Kingdom) Ely	(West Germany) Marburg an der Lahn	(France) Chartres
10	1974	(Netherlands) Leiden	(Switzerland) Muotathal	(Italy) Marostica	(France) Nancy
11	1975	(Belgium) Ypres	(France) Nancy	(Italy) Riccione	(Belgium) Knokke-Heist
12	1976	(United Kingdom) Blackpool	(West Germany) Ettlingen	(Switzerland) La Neuveville	(Belgium) Geel
13	1977	(West Germany) Ludwigsburg	(West Germany) Schliersee	(Belgium) Uccle	(Switzerland) Olivone
14	1978	(Italy) Montecatini Terme	(Italy) Abano Terme	(United Kingdom) Sandwell	(France) Fontainebleau
15	1979	(France) Bordeaux	(France) Bar-le-Duc	(Socialist Federal Republic of Yugoslavia) Zrenjanin	(Belgium) Lierde
16	1980	(Belgium) Namur	(Portugal) Vilamoura	(United Kingdom) Rhuddlan	(Belgium) Merksem
17	1981	(Socialist Federal Republic of Yugoslavia) Belgrade	(United Kingdom) Dartmouth (Portugal) Lisbon	No runner-up	(Socialist Federal Republic of Yugoslavia) Pula
18	1982	(Italy) Urbino	(Belgium) Rochefort	(Switzerland) Versoix	(Portugal) Madeira
19	1988	(Italy) Bellagio	(Portugal) Madeira	(Belgium) Profondeville (Spain) Seville	No third place
20	1989	(Portugal) Madeira	(Portugal) Azores	(Italy) Monte Argentario	(France) Nice
21	1990	(Italy) Treviso	(Spain) Jaca	(Socialist Federal Republic of Yugoslavia) Bor	(Italy) Treviso
22	1991	(Italy) Saint-Vincent	(Italy) Vigevano	(Portugal) Leiria	(France) Megève
23	1992	(Portugal) Ponta Delgada	(Czechoslovakia) Třebíč	(Italy) Breuil-Cervinia (Portugal) Lisbon	No third place
24	1993	(Czech Republic) Karlovy Vary	(Hungary) Kecskemét	(Czech Republic) Šumperk	(Switzerland) Le Bouveret
25	1994	(Wales) Cardiff	(Czech Republic) Česká Třebová	(Wales) Wrexham	(Switzerland) Olivone
26	1995	(Hungary) Budapest	(Czech Republic) Brno	(Hungary) Eger	(Switzerland) Vallemaggia
27	1996	(Italy) Stupinigi	(Hungary) Kecskemét	(Portugal) Lamego	(Italy) Gran San Bernardo
28	1997	(Portugal) Lisbon	(Portugal) Amadora	(Italy) Val di Sole	(Switzerland) Schattdorf
29	1998	(Italy) Trento	(Hungary) Százhalombatta	(Greece) Komotini	(Netherlands) Vlieland
30	1999	(Italy) Le Castella	(Italy) Bolzano-Südtirol	(Greece) Patras	(Hungary) Budapest XII. District

The 1969 Grand Final ended in a tie between German team Wolfsburg and British team Shrewsbury, who both attained 32 points. Under the rules of the competition, Wolfsburg were declared the series winners as the team had scored higher in the Fil Rouge. However, the Wolfsburg team captain insisted that the trophy should be shared and the judges agreed to award both teams joint first place.

After the final game of the 1981 Grand Final was completed, it appeared GB team Dartmouth had won the series golden trophy. However, after an objection raised by the Portuguese, the referees reviewed the game and the French team were disqualified and placed last for the final game. This gained the Portuguese team of Lisbon an extra point, tying them for series winners with Dartmouth.

=== Finals results table ===
Country	Gold	Silver	Bronze	4th	5th	6th	7th	8th	9th
Germany	6	1	2	4	–	2	1	–	–
Portugal	5	3	1	1	1	–	2	2	–
Italy	4	6	5	6	3	2	3	1	–
United Kingdom	4	2	1	3	4	2	–	–	–
France	3	1	7	6	3	2	2	1	–
Hungary	3	1	1	1	–	–	1	–	–
Switzerland	2	3	6	4	4	3	2	–	–
Belgium	2	3	5	2	3	3	2	–	–
Czech Republic	2	1	–	–	–	–	–	–	–
Spain	1	1	–	–	1	1	–	–	–
Czechoslovakia	1	–	–	–	–	–	–	–	–
Netherlands	–	3	1	1	1	2	2	–	–
(Socialist Federal Republic of Yugoslavia) Yugoslavia	–	2	1	1	–	1	1	–	–
Greece	–	2	–	1	2	2	–	–	–
Wales	–	1	–	–	1	1	1	–	–
Slovenia	–	–	–	2	–	1	1	–	–
San Marino	–	–	–	2	–	1	–	–	–
Malta	–	–	–	–	–	1	–	–	1
Tunisia	–	–	–	–	–	–	–	1	–
Liechtenstein (Note: Liechtenstein participated in 1976 in one single heat, but not qualified to the Final.)	–	–	–	–	–	–	–	–	–

== Christmas specials ==
A winter festive themed special version of the show, usually broadcast during the Christmas period, was a single episode edition contested each year from 1973 until 1981. It was generally alternately staged in Cortina d'Ampezzo, Italy by RAI (1973, 1975, 1976, 1979) and Aviemore, Scotland by the BBC (1974, 1977, 1981). Switzerland hosted the 1978 edition in Villars and Belgium hosted the 1980 edition in Liège.

In the UK, the show was entitled It's a Christmas Knockout!, with the other competing broadcasters naming it Zeskamp Speciaal, Giochi Sotto L'Albero, Jeux de Noël, Weihnachtsspiele, Nyårs Knockout, and Jeux Sans Frontieres: Christmas Special.

The show was hosted around an indoor or outdoor ice-rink or on snowy ground. On more than one occasion, when snow failed to materialise for the recording, artificial snow or foam was used instead. The games would generally be played on ice-skates or skis. Mainly, only four countries participated in the winter edition: Great Britain, Belgium, Italy, and the Netherlands (who continued to take part after leaving the main series) and they were joined by a fifth country, Switzerland that participated in the 1977–1980 editions.

After Jeux Sans Frontieres ended following the 1982 Grand Final, a winter/Christmas edition was recorded featuring teams from Belgium, Great Britain, the Netherlands, and Portugal, the latter hosting the event in Praia Dourada, with Belgium winning. A decision was taken not to air the broadcast as it was considered sub-standard, with only Belgian television eventually airing the programme on 26 December 1982. A final edition of the original Christmas themed version was shown at Christmas 1983 in a direct competition between Great Britain and Sweden staged in Aviemore.

When Jeux Sans Frontieres was revived in 1988, the one-off festive edition also returned. The 1990 Christmas special was held in Macau.

=== Christmas special editions ===
Year	Host town/city	Winner	Runner-up	Third place
1970	(Netherlands) Leiden	(Netherlands) Alphen aan den Rijn	(United Kingdom) Great Yarmouth	—N/a
1971	(United Kingdom) Aviemore	(Netherlands) Aalten	(Italy) Jesolo	(United Kingdom) Blackpool
1972	(United Kingdom) Aviemore	(United Kingdom) Aviemore	(Netherlands) IJsselstein	(Belgium) Angleur
1973	(Italy) Cortina d'Ampezzo	(Italy) Cortina d'Ampezzo	(Netherlands) The Dutch Sports Stars	(United Kingdom) Aviemore
1974	(United Kingdom) Aviemore	(United Kingdom) Aviemore	(Netherlands) Dutch 'All Stars'	(Belgium) Woluwe-Saint-Pierre
1975	(Italy) Cortina d'Ampezzo	(Italy) Cortina d'Ampezzo	(Netherlands) Dutch 'All Stars'	(Belgium) Charleroi
1976	(Italy) Cortina d'Ampezzo	(Belgium) Waterloo	(Italy) Cortina d'Ampezzo	(Netherlands) Dutch 'All Stars'
1977	(United Kingdom) Aviemore	(Italy) Bolzano	(United Kingdom) Aviemore	(Switzerland) Les Brenets
1978	(Switzerland) Villars-sur-Ollon	(Belgium) Liège	(Italy) Asiago	(Switzerland) Villars-sur-Ollon
1979	(Italy) Cortina d'Ampezzo	(Netherlands) Den Haag	(Italy) Cortina d'Ampezzo	(Switzerland) Leysin
1980	(Belgium) Liège	(Netherlands) Heerenveen	(Italy) Moena	(United Kingdom) Bristol
1981	(United Kingdom) Aviemore	(United Kingdom) Aviemore	(Italy) Falcade	(Belgium) Namur
1982	(Portugal) Carvoeiro	(Belgium) Blankenberge	(United Kingdom) Plymouth	(Portugal) Carvoeiro
1983	(United Kingdom) Aviemore	(United Kingdom) British 'All-Stars'	(Sweden) Karlskrona	—N/a
1984	(United Kingdom) Blackpool	(United Kingdom) Blackpool	(France) Tourcoing	(West Germany) Bottrop
1990	(Macau) Coloane	(Italy) Bergamo (Socialist Federal Republic of Yugoslavia) Trogir	No runner-up	(Portugal) Guimarães; San Marino
1994	(Wales) Cardiff	Celebrity special. Its five teams were joint winners (Switzerland, Wales, Greece, Malta, and Portugal)		

== Winter edition ==
Interneige or Jeux sans frontières d'hiver is the winter spin-off edition of the competition held in ski resorts for eleven seasons (1965–1968, 1976–1981, and 1992). It was also variously entitled Jeux Sans Frontieres on Ice or Jeux Sans Frontieres in the Snow.

=== Interneige editions ===
Season	Year	Final host town/city	Winner	Runner-up	Third place
1	1965	(France) Villard-de-Lans (Switzerland) Crans-sur-Sierre	(France) Villard-de-Lans	(Switzerland) Crans-sur-Sierre	—N/a
2	1966	(France) La Plagne (Switzerland) Crans-sur-Sierre	(France) La Plagne	(Switzerland) Crans-sur-Sierre	—N/a
3	1967	(Switzerland) Montana-Vermala (France) Les Rousses	(Switzerland) Montana-Vermala	(France) Les Rousses	—N/a
4	1968	(France) L'Alpe d'Huez (Switzerland) Geneva	(France) Le Corbier	(Switzerland) Anzère	—N/a
5	1976	(Switzerland) Thyon 2000	(Switzerland) Thyon	(France) Les Gets	—N/a
6	1977	(France) Les Gets	(Switzerland) Leysin (France) Les Gets	No runner-up	(Italy) Pila-Aosta
7	1978	(Switzerland) Haute-Nendaz	(France) Tignes	(Switzerland) La Chaux-de-Fonds	(Italy) Moena
8	1979	(Italy) Ponte di Legno	(Italy) Val Carlina	(Switzerland) Zinal-Val d'Anniviers	(France) Gourette
9	1980	(France) Megève	(Italy) Cavalese (Socialist Federal Republic of Yugoslavia) Sarajevo	No runner-up	(France) Mont-Dore
10	1981	(Switzerland) Crans-Montana	(Switzerland) Crans-Montana	(France) Méribel	(Italy) Fiemme Valley
11	1992	(Czechoslovakia) Prague	(Czechoslovakia) Nové Město na Moravě	(Italy) Santa Caterina di Valfurva	(Switzerland) Canton of Jura

== Revival attempts ==
In 2006, the EBU announced plans to relaunch the series in summer 2007, in collaboration with Mistral Production and Upside Television. Belgium, Croatia, Spain, Greece, Netherlands, Portugal, Slovenia and Italy were thought to be participating countries. However, due to financial setbacks, the plans were put on hold—originally for twelve months, but later they were abandoned altogether.

In December 2016, the EBU in strategic planning for 2017–2020 included a new format based on the show, called Eurovision Super Games, a new attempt to revisit the TV programme last aired in 1999. Twelve countries had joined and were involved in the project, a competition between eight countries each represented by four athletes playing a series of mental and physical challenges. The audiences at home would have the possibility to elect the two athletes of their country to participate in the proposed challenge. However, due to the lack of financial guarantees, the EBU announced in June 2017 that it would not be created.

A revival of the show was confirmed on 18 June 2019 at the annual France Télévisions press conference, to be produced by Nagui and broadcast on France 2. This revival would later be cancelled in favor of that of Intervilles, announced at the turn of the 2020s. Nagui finally announced in October 2023 that the show was no longer a priority, given the cost of living and the financial difficulties of different cities. However, the revival of the show is still a possibility in the future, with Intervilles eventually being revived in 2025.

=== Eurogames ===
In 2019, the EBU lost the rights of the format and was franchised by Mediaset for a season retitled Eurogames filmed at Cinecittà World in Rome. The show was devoted to light-hearted matches between teams from Italy, Spain, Germany, and Greece alongside newcomers Poland, and Russia. The Italian version aired on Canale 5 from 19 September 2019 to 24 October 2019, with Ilary Blasi and Alvin as hosts. In Spain, six episodes premiered on the streaming service Mitele Plus on 3 January 2020, with Lara Álvarez and Joaquín Prat as hosts, and were later aired on Telecinco. In Greece it was aired on Skai TV and in Cyprus on Sigma TV.

== In popular culture ==
- The show inspired Peter Gabriel's 1980 hit single, "Games Without Frontiers" (the direct English translation of the title), in which backing vocalist Kate Bush sings jeux sans frontières during breaks. The lyrics also refer to title of the British version of the show, It's a Knockout.
- The last album of the popular Macedonian pop singer Toše Proeski is named Games without borders (Macedonian: Игри Без Граници).
- The Endeavour episode "Quartet" (series 5, episode 5) features a fictional 1968 Jeux sans frontières competition held in Oxford, broadcast by Southern Independent Television (rather than the BBC).
- The show was a major component of The Goodies episode, "The Goodies and the Beanstalk".
- In Peter Kay's Phoenix Nights, the company that supplies the club with many of the fruit machines (including a Das Boot version that only pays out in Deutsche Marks) and other assorted gaming paraphernalia is called Jeux Sans Frontières.
- In 1986, a video game was made, based on the show. It was released on the Commodore 64, the Amstrad CPC and the ZX Spectrum. It was critically panned.

== See also ==
- It's a Knockout
- Telematch
