= Stuart Hall (presenter) =

English media personality (born 1929)

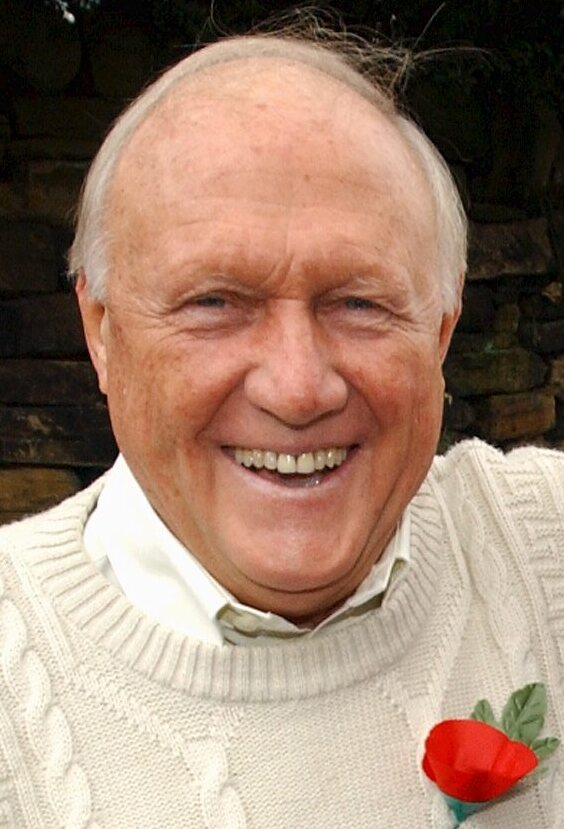
- Hall in 2010
- Born: James Stuart Hall; 25 December 1929 (age 96); Ashton-under-Lyne, Lancashire, England
- Occupations: Radio broadcaster; television presenter
- Years active: 1959–2012
- Spouse: Hazel Bennett (m. 1958)
- Children: 3
- Status: Released from prison
- Criminal charge: Indecent assault
- Penalty: 5 years (two consecutive 30-month sentences)

Details
- Victims: at least 21 (Dame Janet Smith Review)
- Span of crimes: 1967–1991
- Date apprehended: 5 December 2012 (age 82)
- Imprisoned at: HM Prison Wymott (June 2013 – December 2015)

James Stuart Hall (born 25 December 1929) is an English former media personality and convicted sex offender. He presented regional news programmes for the BBC in North West England in the 1960s and 1970s, while becoming known nationally for presenting the game show It's a Knockout (which was part of the international Jeux sans frontières franchise). Hall's later career mainly involved football reporting on BBC Radio. In June 2013, he was convicted of multiple sexual offences against children, effectively ending his media and broadcasting career.

== Early life ==
Hall was born on 25 December 1929 in Ashton-under-Lyne, Lancashire, the eldest son of baker James Stuart Hall, and his Irish-born wife, Mary (née Hennessey). He was brought up in Hyde, Cheshire, and Glossop, Derbyshire, attending the local grammar school. Hall directed plays when at school and chaired its debating society. While studying at the University of Manchester Institute of Science and Technology, he was offered a playing contract with Crystal Palace F.C. but turned it down because of the low wages.

== Career ==
=== Journalism ===
Hall joined the BBC in 1959 as a general reporter on Radio Newsreel and a sports journalist on Sports Report. Between 1965 and 1990, he presented BBC North West's regional news programmes produced in Manchester, originally called Look North, then Look North West and finally North West Tonight, alongside John Mundy. During the run of Nationwide (1969–83), Hall became known nationally through live link-ups.

In 1990, Hall moved to ITV Granada's Granada Reports, where he worked with Bob Greaves in a slot titled "Greaves and Hall". During the 2000s, he joined Channel M, a local television station in Manchester, presenting Hall's Heroes on Channel M News.

=== Entertainment ===
Between 1972 and 1982, Hall became particularly well known as the presenter of It's a Knockout on BBC1 and its European equivalent, Jeux Sans Frontières. He would often be overcome by laughter at the slapstick antics of the competitors. This led to his becoming a popular subject for impersonation. After the series was cancelled, Hall presented the one-off Grand Knockout Tournament (also known as "It's a Royal Knockout") in 1987, and retained the rights to the programme and some costumes, which enabled him to host similar programmes and events in other parts of the world.

Hall also presented Quiz Ball (a BBC football quiz show) between 1971 and 1972; was the original host of the long-running sports quiz A Question of Sport (at that time only broadcast in the North of England); presented Going, Going, Gone (a BBC antiques quiz show) in the late 1990s; and provided the voice-over for God's Gift for Granada Television. In 2008, Hall provided his voice for a special segment on Les Dennis's Home Video Heroes. In a typical episode, he would be shown a series of humorous clips and there would be a 'laugh-ometer' at the bottom of the screen measuring how much he laughed.

=== Football ===
As a football reporter, Hall is associated with the phrase "The Beautiful Game", which he popularised, and which he reports he coined in his youth to describe football. As a lifelong Manchester City supporter, he admired prolific goal-scorer Peter Doherty's style of playing and consequently used the phrase "The Beautiful Game" to describe Doherty.

The first football match that Hall reported on was Sheffield Wednesday versus Leicester City at Hillsborough in 1958, where the teams shared eight goals. Despite his love of Manchester City, he has affectionately referred to their former home ground Maine Road as the 'Theatre of Base Comedy', an allusion to City's Manchester rivals Manchester United's home ground Old Trafford, which is known as the 'Theatre of Dreams'.

During the 1970s, Hall developed a friendship with Liverpool manager Bill Shankly and became a regular visitor to the Anfield 'Boot Room'. His relationship with Bob Paisley enabled him to pull off a coup, capturing the team's first European Cup final in 1977 in Rome. Smuggled into the ground as a club employee, Hall spent the match on the substitutes' bench wearing the No 14 shirt. This enabled him to get inside television footage of the team's 3–1 win over Borussia Mönchengladbach. As a television presenter with Look North, Hall used to turn out for benefit matches, scoring twice against Gordon Banks in Eddie Hopkinson's testimonial at Bolton Wanderers.

Hall worked as a football reporter for BBC Radio 5 Live for some years. On 10 December 2009, Radio 5 Live presented a special programme, Stuart Hall Night, broadcast live from the City of Manchester Stadium.

== Child sexual abuse prosecution and conviction ==
In May 2012, Yasmin Alibhai-Brown, a journalist and regular columnist for The Independent, received an anonymous three-page letter alleging that Hall had groomed and sexually abused the sender while she was a schoolgirl in the 1970s. The writer stated that she had been motivated to disclose her experiences by the reports of sexual abuse by Jimmy Savile after his death and by her anger at Hall's appointment as an OBE in the 2012 New Year Honours. Alibhai-Brown passed the letter to the Metropolitan Police at Ealing police station, who in turn sent it on to Lancashire Constabulary, in whose jurisdiction the alleged offences had occurred. Lancashire Constabulary then began an investigation.

On 5 December 2012, police arrested Hall and charged him with three historical counts of indecent assault, involving a 16- or 17-year-old girl in 1974, a 9-year-old girl in 1983, and a 13-year-old girl in 1984. Released on bail, Hall initially denied any wrongdoing, issuing a statement through his solicitor that he was "innocent of these charges". When he appeared at Preston Magistrates' Court on 7 January 2013, he pleaded not guilty to all three charges. The case was committed to Crown Court for trial. Hall was released on bail on condition that he remained resident at his home address and had no unsupervised contact with children under the age of 17. Media coverage of the case led to more women coming forward to state that Hall had also sexually abused them.

On 22 January 2013, Hall was charged with raping a 22-year-old woman in 1976 and indecently assaulting ten more girls, then aged from 9 to 17 years old, between 1967 and 1986. Speaking to reporters after an appearance at Preston Magistrates Court on 7 February 2013, Hall again denied any wrongdoing, calling the charges "pernicious, callous, cruel and, above all, spurious".

However, at a pre-trial hearing at Preston Crown Court on 16 April 2013, Hall pleaded guilty to 14 charges of indecent assault involving 13 girls aged between 9 and 17 years old. He was released on bail pending sentencing on 17 June. Reporting restrictions prevented the media from making the news public until 2 May, when the Crown Prosecution Service (CPS) elected not to pursue the rape charge or three other indecent assault charges relating to the same complainant, who had decided not to give evidence. Hall made a statement through his barrister issuing an "unreserved apology" to his victims.

On 15 July 2013, Lancashire Constabulary confirmed that five new allegations of rape and sexual assault had been made against Hall, including the alleged rape of a 12-year-old girl. These investigations resulted in a further 16 charges of rape and indecent assault being laid against Hall in October 2013. On 6 November, he appeared in court in relation to the new charges, but did not make any plea. He made a further appearance in court on 29 November; at a preliminary court hearing on 28 February 2014, he pleaded not guilty to raping two young girls. He went on trial at Preston Crown Court on 6 May 2014, where he admitted indecently assaulting a girl under 16 but denied 20 further charges. On 16 May, Hall was found not guilty of 15 charges of rape and four counts of indecent assault but was found guilty on two counts of indecent assault against a 13-year-old girl.

=== Sentencing ===
At Preston Crown Court on 17 June 2013, Judge Anthony Russell QC sentenced Hall to 15 months in prison. Later the same day, the attorney general's office announced that it had received complaints that the sentence was "unduly lenient". The then shadow attorney general and Labour MP Emily Thornberry stated that she believed Hall deserved a longer sentence given the age of his victims and the fact that he had publicly denied the offences at first. The attorney general subsequently referred the sentence to the Court of Appeal for review. On 26 July, Hall's sentence was increased to 30 months. Following his additional conviction for indecent assault in May 2014, Mr Justice Turner sentenced Hall to a further two years and six months in prison, to run consecutively to his existing prison sentence of 30 months.

In a later ruling on the case of Max Clifford, the appeal court compared Clifford's case with Hall's; Clifford had claimed innocence, but did not directly impugn his victims. In contrast, Hall had publicly denounced his victims and accused one of seeking "instant notoriety". A lawyer commented on the Clifford ruling: "Nothing Clifford did resembled the disastrous approach taken by Stuart Hall who, prior to pleading guilty to abusing them as girls, denounced his accusers as gold-diggers and liars." Clifford's actions were deemed merely to show no remorse, and not to justify an increased penalty on appeal, although ruling out a reduction in sentence due to mitigating factors; in contrast Hall's sentence was increased on appeal.

=== Civil action ===
In July 2013, the media reported that 17 women were preparing to launch civil claims against Hall and the BBC, on whose premises a number of sexual assaults had allegedly taken place. Lawyers for the women confirmed that several of the claims related to alleged offences that were not part of Hall's criminal prosecution.

Following Hall's arrest for child sexual offences, Land Registry records revealed that on 22 February 2013, he had transferred his home, which he and his wife Hazel had owned jointly since 1981, into his wife's sole name. Although Hall claimed that he was getting his financial affairs in order because of a heart condition that left him at risk of sudden death, lawyers acting for his victims said they would seek a court order to nullify the transfer of the property, worth an estimated £1.2 million, on the basis that he had relinquished ownership to avoid compensation claims.

=== Release ===
Hall was released from HM Prison Wymott near Preston, Lancashire, on 16 December 2015, having served half his sentence. He arrived home in time for Christmas and his birthday on the same day. In a February 2016 interview with The Sun, Hall criticised his accusers, 'those who impugned' him, for bringing him down and says he hopes for 'fairness'. A woman Hall attacked when she was a teenage girl said, "To me he'll always be the lowest of the low, a vile paedophile who's ruined so many lives."

=== BBC response ===
When the news of Hall's guilty plea became public, the BBC immediately terminated his contract and stated: "The BBC is appalled by the disgraceful actions of Stuart Hall and we would like to express our sympathy to his victims." Lord Patten, then chairman of the BBC Trust, initially announced that Dame Janet Smith would extend her inquiry into the Jimmy Savile sex abuse scandal to include Hall's sex offences. The BBC subsequently decided to launch a separate inquiry headed by a different individual. As a result of Hall's crimes, the BBC no longer uses clips featuring Hall and edits him out of archive footage when they are broadcast on television.

The Dame Janet Smith Review, released 25 February 2016, found that Hall had assaulted 21 female victims at the BBC, the youngest of whom was aged 10, between 1967 and 1991. The report found that some BBC staff members were aware he was bringing underage girls into his dressing room for sex, but his "untouchable" celebrity status stopped them from passing complaints to senior management.

== Personal life and honours ==
Hall married Hazel Bennett on 1 March 1958 and lived in Wilmslow, Cheshire, until his 2013 conviction. The couple's first son, Nicholas, died shortly after birth because of a heart defect. They went on to have a daughter and another son. Hall owns an extensive collection of clocks, including one depicting his 'hero', French general and statesman Napoleon. It was reported in February 2014 that Hazel was "filing for divorce" before Hall's trial in May 2014 where he was accused, but eventually acquitted, of raping two teenage girls. As of 2026, Bennett is still married to Hall.

In 1978, Hall was called as a prosecution witness during the trial of a policeman, who was accused of driving "while unfit through drink and drugs". Prior to his arrest, the officer had stopped Hall on suspicion of speeding and Hall had invited him to his house for a drink. The officer later blamed his intoxicated state on Hall having laced his drink. Hall denied the accusation and was never charged.

In 1991, Hall was cleared of shoplifting sausages and a jar of coffee from a Safeway supermarket. He said the incident was due to being "absent-minded" as a result of the burglary of his watch collection.

=== Honours ===
In 1999, various Members of Parliament signed a House of Commons Early Day Motion, congratulating Hall on 40 years in broadcasting. Hall was appointed Officer of the Order of the British Empire (OBE) in the 2012 New Year Honours for services to broadcasting and charity, but the honour was formally annulled in October 2013 due to his conviction for sex offences.
