= Guy Lux =

French television presenter

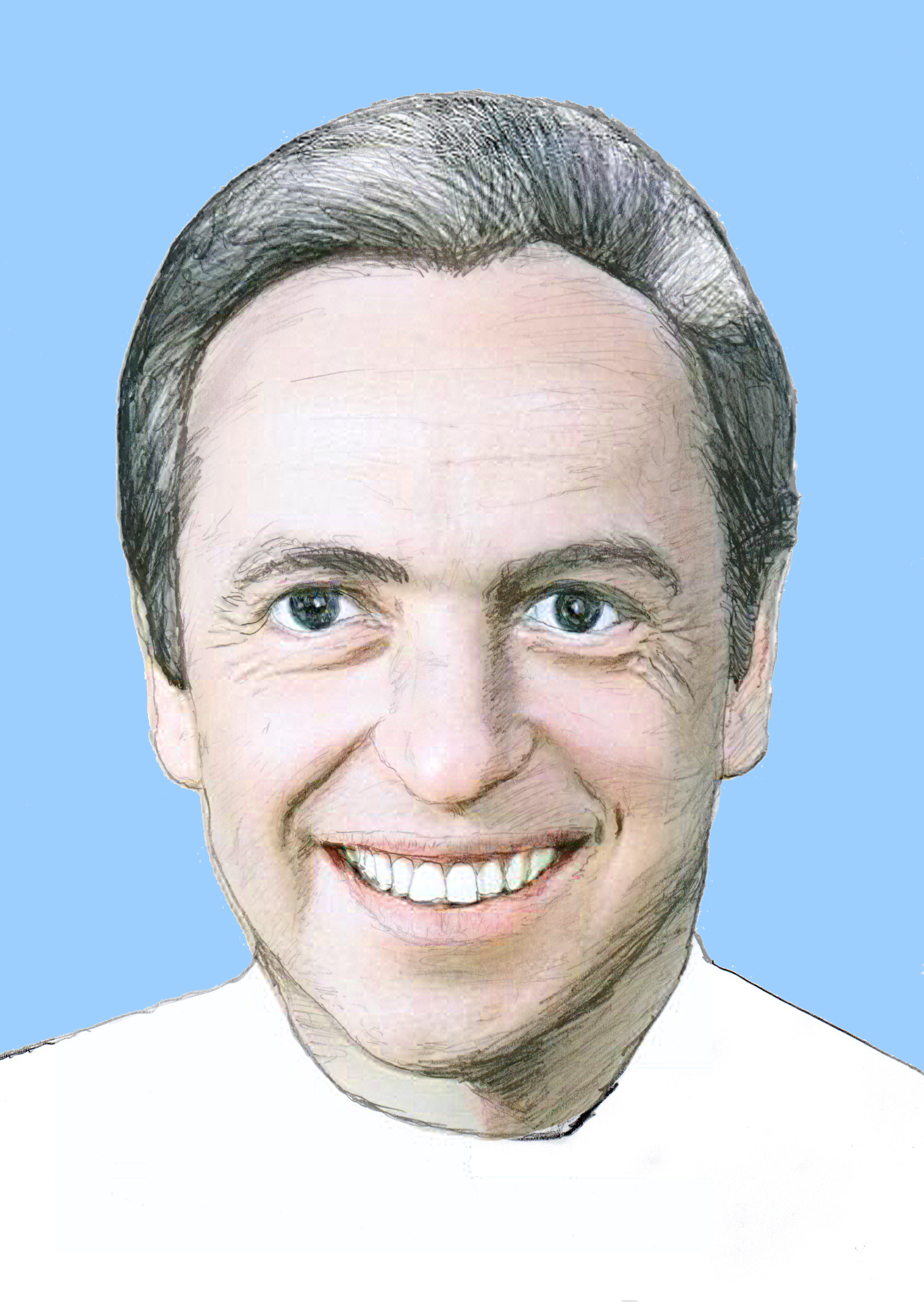
- Born: Guy Maurice Lux; 21 June 1919; Paris, France
- Died: 13 June 2003 (aged 83); Neuilly-sur-Seine, France
- Resting place: Saint-Gratien Cemetery in Val-d'Oise
- Spouse(s): Paulette Lisle, 1942–1995 (her death)
- Partner(s): Vonny (extramarital); Muriel Montossey (extramarital)
- Children: 6 (2 deceased)
- Presenting career
- Show: Intervilles
- Network: RTF, ORTF, FR3, TF1
- Show: Top Club
- Network: Antenne 2
- Style: Television host Television producer
- Country: France

Guy Maurice Lux (21 June 1919 – 13 June 2003) was a French TV host and producer best known for his 1961 creation of the game show Intervilles and its numerous spinoffs. During his 40 year career, he produced, directed, hosted, and wrote more than 40 television shows.

== Biography ==
Lux was born Guy Maurice Lux on 21 June 1919 in Paris, France, and had Alsatian ancestry. He attended Lycée Arago for high school then École Estienne for university. He studied fine arts and applied arts and studied to be a lyricist. In 1939, he joined the war effort as an ambulance driver but was taken prisoner by enemy troops. He escaped and joined the French Resistance and later the Allied troops. After the war, he was awarded the Escapees' Medal and a Croix de Guerre.

Due in part to the economic conditions in post-war France, Lux had difficulty finding buyers for his songs. In the 1940s, he ran a hardware store in Asnières-sur-Seine, where he would set up games for his customers to play, especially during the Tour de France. He did not start working in media until 1952.

== Television career ==
Lux hosted his first game show, Contact, in 1960. This show would later become La roue tourne, which he hosted alongside Jean-Francois Chiappe and Marina Gray in 1960-1964. Another significant game show he hosted was Intervilles in 1962-1964, 1970-1971, 1973, and 1985-1991, almost the entire time with Léon Zitrone, Simone Garnier, and Claude Savarit. This show was based on the Italian programme Campanile sera and later inspired the British show It's a Knockout. He created and hosted the spinoffs Jeux sans frontières (all-Europe competition), Interneige (continuation of Jeux sans frontières), Intercontinents (international competition), Interglace (winter competitions), and Interchallenges. He also hosted Ring Parade and its sequel Système 2 and the popular variety show Le Schmilblick, which popularized the word schmilblick, similar to the English thingamajig. He created and produced the shows La Classe, La Une est à vous, Succès fous, Capitale d'un soir, and L'Or à l'appel as well.

Though he mainly worked with television, he appeared, oftentimes as a fictionalized version of himself, in several films, including Clémentine chérie (1964), Bang Bang (1967), Les fous du stade (1972), Comme sur des roulettes (1977), and Le Bourreau des cœurs (1983). He also wrote and composed the song "A la queue leu leu" which was sung by André Bézu, and recorded a comedy song called "Le Tango d'Intervilles" with co-host Léon Zitrone. In 2021, Lux and Zitrone were featured in the documentary Les Duos mythiques de la television as one of France's legendary duos. He wrote and directed the comedy film Drôles de zèbres in 1977, starring Coluche, and in 1980 created his own production company, People Production.

He retired from his television career in 1993, due largely to his age and the new talent available elsewhere.

== Personal life ==
Lux was known to enjoy betting on horses, so much so that there is now a race called Prix Guy Lux et Léon Zitrone held in Paris. Sophie Darel, with whom he worked for 15 years on a number of shows, described him as "very anxious" and angry because of it, though she still had affection for him since his violent outbursts lasted only briefly. In 1994, Lux started Pas d'enfants sans vacances (English: No child without vacation), which takes children from families who cannot afford vacations over the summer holidays to the beach and/or countryside.

Lux married Paulette Lisle in 1942 and the couple had two children: Christiane (1942-1964) and Michel (1943-present). Christiane died in a car accident in 1964 and Lux and his wife raised her 3-month old son, Jean-Christophe Lauduique, in her place. Jean-Christophe and actress Ariane Séguillon are parents to Dorian Lauduique of the French DJ duo Ofenbach. Jean-Christophe released music under the name Christophe Jenac in the 1980s.

Lux had at least two extramarital affairs during his marriage to Paulette, resulting in four illegitimate children, three of which he never publicly acknowledged. Pierre, mothered by actress and TV host Vonny. He had another daughter, Laura-Charlotte, with actress Muriel Montossey. This was revealed following Laura-Charlotte's death on 26 May 1993 at 16 months old, when her death certificate, which included Lux's name, was published in newspapers and tabloids across France.

Lux died on 13 June 2003 in Neuilly-sur-Seine, France. He is buried in Saint-Gratien Cemetery in Val-d'Oise alongside his wife Paulette and daughter Christiane.

== Selected filmography ==
=== Television ===
Year	Title	Show type	Role(s)	Episodes	Ref
1965–1968, 1979–1981	Le palmarès des chansons	Music competition	Self, producer	65	
1969	Le schmilblic	Game show	Host	2	
1971	Les étoiles de la chanson	Music competition	Host, executive producer	11	
1962–1971	Intervilles	Game show	Host, creator, writer, producer	21	
1971–1973	Cadet Rousselle	Variety show	Host, producer	28	
1974	Domino	Music	Host, producer	17	
1974	French CanCan		Host, producer	8	
1975–1976	Samedi est à vous	Music competition	Presenter, producer		
1975–1976	Ring Parade	Music competition	Host, producer	64	
1975–1976	Système 2	Music competition	Host, producer	64	
1977	Un taxi en or	Variety show, soap opera	Host, creator		
1978–1981	Top Club	Music competition	Host, producer	88	
1965–1982	Jeux sans frontières	Game show	Host, creator, writer	56	
1983–1985	Cadence 3	Variety show	Host, writer (1 ep), producer	50	
1987	La classe	Variety show	Producer	45	
1989	La une est à vous	Competition	Creator, writer, songwriter, producer	1	
1992	Double jeu	Talk show	Self	1	

=== Film ===
Year	Title	Role(s)	Notes	Ref
1964	Clémentine chérie	Self		
1967	Bang Bang	Guy Descartes, Sheila's uncle		
1972	Les fous du stade	Self		
1977	Drôles de zèbres	Self (uncredited), director, writer		
1977	La Bastille en chantant	Host, producer	TV special	
1977	Comme sur des roulettes	Guy Lux		
1980	Sur son 31	Self, producer	TV special	
1983	Le Bourreau des cœurs	Guy Lux		
1996	L'Or à l'appel	Writer		
