= Eládio Clímaco =

Portuguese television presenter

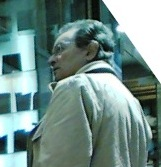
- Born: Eládio Taboas Clímaco; 27 October 1941 (age 84); Lisbon, Portugal
- Occupation: Television presenter

Eládio Taboas Clímaco (born 27 October 1941) is a Portuguese television presenter best known for hosting Festival da Canção, Jeux Sans Frontières, commentating on the Eurovision Song Contest for RTP viewers, and providing voice narration for many television documentaries. He also co-hosted the OTI Festival 1987.

== Career ==
After several years of training in theatre and cinema, Clímaco joint RTP in 1972 and began hosting the entertainment show Domingo à Noite which was broadcast from Teatro Maria Matos. In 1976, he began hosting Festival da Canção, he also presented Jeux Sans Frontières from 1979 until 1997, and commented on the Eurovision Song Contest for RTP viewers between 1976 and 2006 on 14 occasions. He also hosted, along Ana Zanatti, the OTI Festival 1987 from Teatro São Luiz in Lisbon.

In recent years Clímaco has still remained associate with RTP, in 2006 he participated in Dança Comigo (Portuguese counterpart of the UK's Strictly Come Dancing) and in 2007 he participated in the Golden Anniversary programme to celebrate 50 Years of RTP. He also was a presenter on RTP Memória.
