= Denis Pettiaux =

Belgian acrobat (born 1956)

Denis Pettiaux (born 1956) is a Belgian acrobat and former referee of the EBU production Jeux Sans Frontières.

His first contact with Jeux Sans Frontières was in 1981 when he participated in an episode in the French town of Annecy. The Belgian team played Pettiaux on a tightrope walking game and also played their Joker on it, which gives extra points. Pettiaux performed very well on this game, and this helps the Belgian team to win that night. They also qualify for the final, but they have no success, as they finish rock bottom there. Also in 1988 he participated for a Belgian team and once again his team picks the win.

In 1990 Pettiaux became the international referee of Jeux Sans Frontières. First with Bernhard Galley, since 1992 on his own. He uses his talent for acrobatics in demonstrations for certain games. In 1996 he can demonstrate a game with a unicycle. His famous quote "Attention, prêts?" announced the start of a game, before he blows his whistle. He is the referee until the end in 1999, a total of 122 episodes long.

After the end of Jeux Sans Frontières Pettiaux returns to his original job as a teacher for people with disabilities.
