= Intervilles =

French television game show

- Logo for the 50th anniversary special (2013)
- Genre: Game show
- Created by: Guy Lux; Claude Savarit
- Based on: Campanile sera
- Presented by: Various (see below)
- Country of origin: France
- Original language: French
- No. of series: 24
- No. of episodes: 344

Production
- Running time: 120 minutes
- Production companies: People Productions (1985–1991); Carrere Télévision (1987–1991); GLEM (1995–1999); Mistral Production (1999, 2004–2009, 2013); Air Productions (2005, 2025)

Original release
- Network: RTF
- Release: 17 July 1962 – 19 September 1963
- Network: ORTF (1964, 1970–1971, 1973)
- Release: 2 July 1964 – 25 September 1973
- Network: France Régions 3
- Release: 10 July – 24 July 1985
- Network: TF1 (1986–1991, 1995–1999)
- Release: 4 July 1986 – 6 September 1999
- Network: France 2 (2004–2005); France 3 (2006–2009)
- Release: 5 July 2004 – 26 August 2009
- Network: France 2
- Release: 29 June 2013
- Release: 3 July 2025 – present

Related
- Jeux sans frontières It's a Knockout

Intervilles (French: [ɛ̃tɛʁvil]) is a French comedy game show first broadcast in 1962. The show was based on a previous Italian programme. It featured teams representing towns in France competing in a series of games, some of which involved live cows and bulls (referred to as the vachettes).

Broadcast for over fifty years despite several interruptions, it is one of the longest-running French game shows, one of the most adapted French programs for foreign audiences and one of the flagship programs of the summer in France, along with Fort Boyard and La Carte aux trésors. Its success led to the launch of the European version, Jeux sans frontières, as well as the winter versions, Interneige and then Interglace.

== Broadcast ==
The show was aired from July 17, 1962, on RTF, then on ORTF from 1964 to 1973. After 12 years of absence, it reappeared on July 10, 1985, on FR3, before moving to TF1 from July 4, 1986, to September 6, 1999, despite allegations of cheating in 1997. France Télévisions revived the show and initially aired it on France 2 from July 5, 2004, before moving it to France 3 from June 23, 2006, to August 26, 2009.

A special programme was broadcast on France 2 on June 29, 2013, to mark the show's 50th anniversary, and an international version was broadcast on Gulli from 2014 to 2016. In 2019, it was announced that the programme would be revived, albeit without including the vachettes. Nagui finally announced in October 2023 that the show was no longer a priority, given the cost of living and the financial difficulties of different cities. However, in September 2024 it was officially confirmed by France Télévisions' Stéphane Sitbon-Gomez that the show would be revived in the summer of 2025.

== Background and history ==
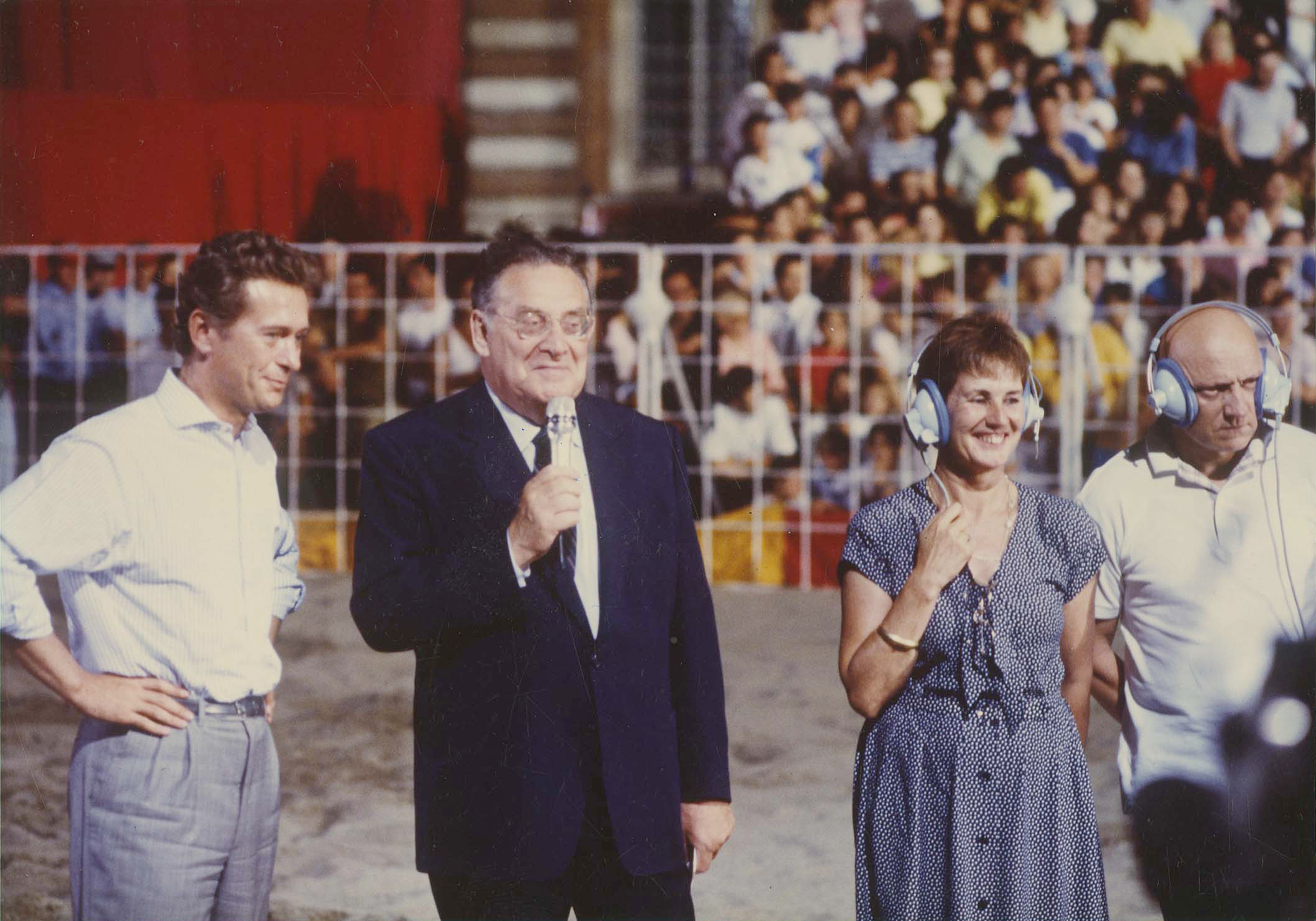
Filming in Toulouse, July 1986 with its mayor Dominique Baudis (left), the presenter Léon Zitrone and two candidates.

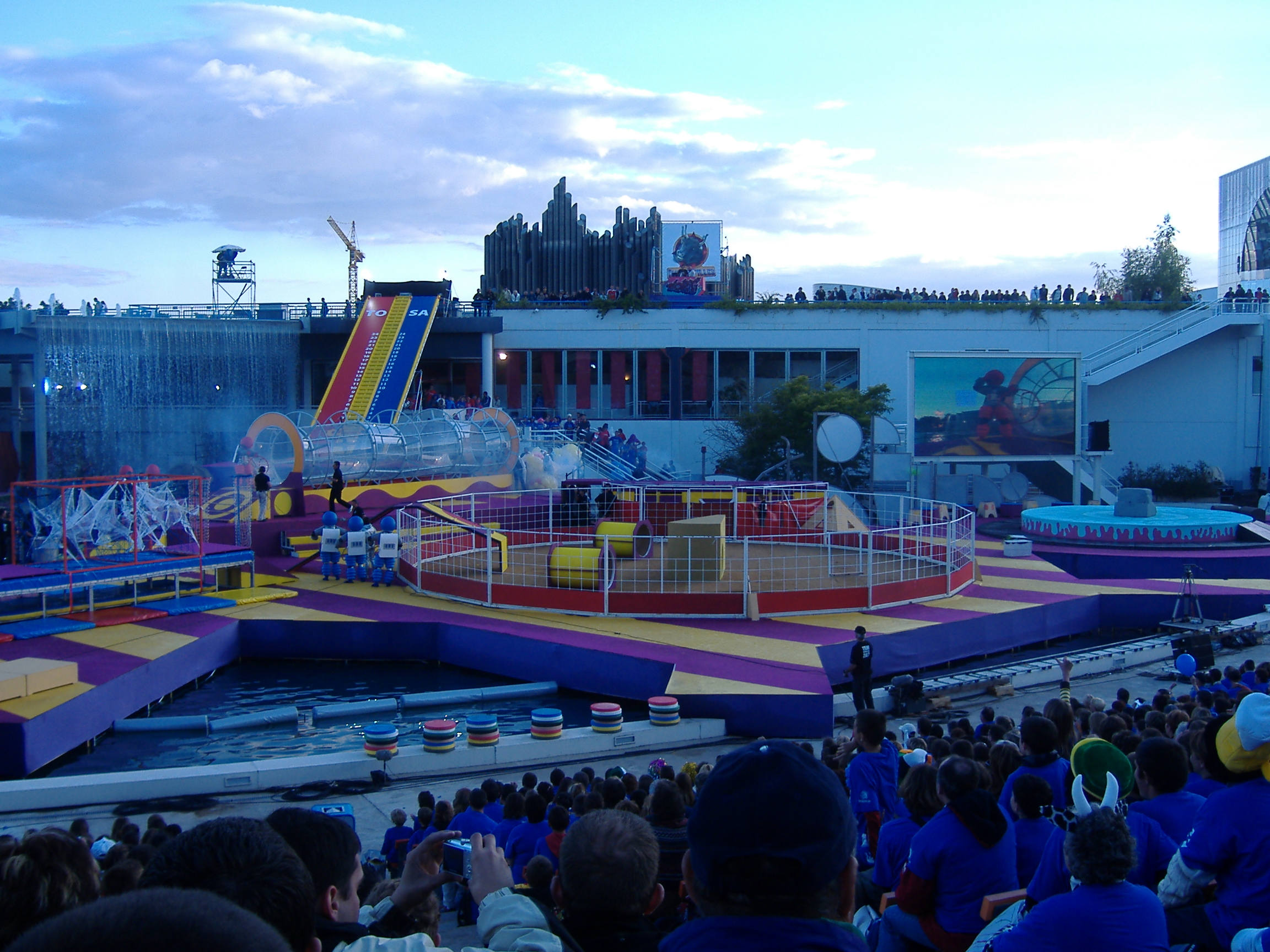
Filming at the Futuroscope theme park (2007)

Intervilles was created as an adaption of the Italian programme Campanile sera, which pitted two teams representing separate towns against each other in a series of games and obstacle courses. When the 1962 Tour de France was not broadcast on French television due to a dispute over allowing commercial advertising on the Tour, Intervilles was created to fill the time. The original rule brought in by the creator Guy Lux was that towns could only participate if they had 20,000 inhabitants or less to avoid big cities because of a belief they lacked local pride. The first episode pitted Saint-Amand-les-Eaux and Armentières in Dax against each other in an open-air arena in front of 6,000 spectators. Reportedly it became so popular that the President of France, Charles de Gaulle would rearrange his official schedule to watch it. The programme inspired the British programme It's a Knockout.

In the 1990s, Olivier Chiabodo said the games were rigged to keep up suspense by soaping up surfaces for the team in the lead. This was after Chiabodo had been fired from the programme by TF1 after having been accused of cheating by Le Canard enchaîné newspaper. Chiabodo was accused of helping Puy du Fou win in 1996 and 1997 by indicating quiz answers to them using his hands. The mayor of Mont-de-Marsan which opposed Puy du Fou in the 1997 final made the allegation of cheating by stating: "Nous ne sommes pas venus ici en culottes de chou nous faire brouter le cul par des lapins" ("We did not come here in cabbage breeches to have our arses eaten by rabbits"). Puy du Fou sued for defamation and the losers of the previous year Pont-Saint-Esprit also sued Chiabodo, alleging that he tried to put their contestants off by making negative comments towards them. Chiabodo sued Le Canard enchaîné for 400,000 francs but was only awarded a token 1 franc in damages.

In 2013, a special anniversary programme was broadcast on France 2 to celebrate 50 years of the programme. The episode included a repeat of the original final between teams representing Dax and Saint-Amand-les-Eaux. This was done in the hopes of a revival to be broadcast the next year.

== Vachettes ==
Intervilles became well known for its use of horned cows and young bulls in the games, referred to as the "vachettes" (cowhides). The bulls were not originally a part of the programme, but when Lux visited Buglose in South West France, he was persuaded to include bulls after seeing the popularity of cattle shows. He asked local breeder Joseph Labat to provide the bulls, an agreement that continued through three generations of the Labat family. The bulls were adolescents and entered the ring with rubber balls on their horns for safety. The vachette was let loose to disrupt the competitors and would often attack them by goring them. The vachettes were not trained in any way and were allowed to behave naturally. Individual cows were selected for the programme based upon their temperament.

In the 2000s, a cow called Rosa became a popular star of the programme. She appeared in every episode from her debut in 2004 to the series' end in 2009 and appeared in the 2013 anniversary special. With a black head and white body, she had a reputation for being very aggressive towards contestants but having intelligence to knock down sets when needed. She was later given her own game called "Rosa Strike". Even after the programme finished, fans of the programme would visit the Labat's farm to see Rosa. When she died in 2020, it made national news in France.

In 2019, it was announced by France Télévisions that Intervilles would be revived but that it would not include the vachettes. There was a negative reaction to this from towns in southern France, where bullfighting is common. They accused the network of having been cowed by animal rights activists and moving towards "Anglo-Saxon customs". The former host Nagui supported the move saying he did not like seeing how the animals were treated when he was the host. In response to that statement, Teddy Labat countered by saying that the animals were treated well and pointed out that Nagui took no interest in their well-being behind the scenes during filming. Fifty towns and cities agreed to take part in a boycott of the revival until the cows were returned. Due to the COVID-19 pandemic in France, filming for the revival was delayed.

== Hosts ==
Year	Channel	Hosts						
1962		Guy Lux	Simone Garnier	Roger Couderc	Léon Zitrone		—N/a	—N/a
1963		Guy Lux	Simone Garnier	Claude Savarit	Léon Zitrone		—N/a	—N/a
1964		Guy Lux	Simone Garnier	Claude Savarit	Léon Zitrone		—N/a	—N/a
1970		Guy Lux	Simone Garnier	Claude Savarit	Léon Zitrone		—N/a	—N/a
1971		Guy Lux	Simone Garnier	Claude Savarit	Léon Zitrone		—N/a	—N/a
1973		Guy Lux	Simone Garnier	Claude Savarit	Léon Zitrone		—N/a	—N/a
1985		Guy Lux	Simone Garnier	Claude Savarit	Léon Zitrone		—N/a	—N/a
1986		Guy Lux	Simone Garnier	Claude Savarit	Léon Zitrone		—N/a	—N/a
1987		Guy Lux	Simone Garnier	Claude Savarit	Léon Zitrone		—N/a	—N/a
1988		Guy Lux	Simone Garnier	Claude Savarit	Léon Zitrone		—N/a	—N/a
1989		Guy Lux	Simone Garnier	Claude Savarit	Léon Zitrone		—N/a	—N/a
1990		Guy Lux	Simone Garnier	Claude Savarit	Léon Zitrone		—N/a	—N/a
1991		Guy Lux	Simone Garnier	Claude Savarit	Denise Fabre	Philippe Risoli	Patrick Roy and Pascal Brunner	Évelyne Leclercq
Year	Channel	Primary hosts		Secondary hosts			Referees	
1995		Jean-Pierre Foucault	Fabrice	Nathalie Simon	—N/a		Olivier Chiabodo	—N/a
1996		Jean-Pierre Foucault	Fabrice	Nathalie Simon	—N/a		Olivier Chiabodo	—N/a
1997		Jean-Pierre Foucault	Thierry Roland	Nathalie Simon	—N/a		Olivier Chiabodo	—N/a
1998		Jean-Pierre Foucault	Julien Courbet	Delphine Anaïs	Laurent Mariotte		Robert Wurtz	—N/a
1999		Jean-Pierre Foucault	Fabrice	Nathalie Simon	Laurent Mariotte		Olivier Grandjean	—N/a
2004		Nagui	Juliette Arnaud	—N/a	—N/a	—N/a	Robert Wurtz (until Tours-Saintes 2007)	Olivier Alleman (assistant)
2005		Nagui	Patrice Laffont	Nathalie Simon	—N/a	Philippe Corti	Robert Wurtz (until Tours-Saintes 2007)	Olivier Alleman (assistant)
2006		Tex	Julien Lepers	Nathalie Simon	Vanessa Dolmen	Philippe Corti	Robert Wurtz (until Tours-Saintes 2007)	Olivier Alleman (assistant)
2007		Tex	Julien Lepers	Nathalie Simon	Vanessa Dolmen	Philippe Corti	Olivier Alleman (from Tours-Saintes 2007 onwards)	—N/a
2008		Tex	Julien Lepers	Nathalie Simon	Alessandro di Sarno	Philippe Corti	Olivier Alleman (from Tours-Saintes 2007 onwards)	Sandra Murugiah (assistant)
2009		Nelson Monfort	Philippe Candeloro	Nathalie Simon	—N/a		Olivier Alleman (from Tours-Saintes 2007 onwards)	Michel Ménétrier (assistant)
2013		Olivier Minne	Nathalie Simon	Big Ali	—N/a		Tex	Michel Ménétrier (assistant)
2025		Nagui	Bruno Guillon	Camille Cerf	Valérie Bègue	Magali Ripoll	Yoann Riou	

== Other spin-off versions ==
Lux also created and hosted the following spin-offs:

- Jeux sans frontières, a Europe-wide competition with summer and winter editions
- Interneige, a winter version of Jeux sans frontières held in ski resorts (1964–1968, 1976–1981 and 1987)
- Intercontinents, an international competition (1987–1988)
- Interglace, a winter version of Intervilles (1987, 1989 and 1995)
- Interchallenges (1988)
- Intervilles Juniors (later Inter-Juniors), a version for children (2007–2009)

=== Intervilles around the world ===
There was another international version, Intervilles International (later also known, in English, as The Biggest Game Show in the World) aired from 2005 to 2016 in which several teams compete, each of which represents its country. The referee was Olivier Grandjean for all twelve seasons, originally filmed at various locations in France, before moving to Budapest, Hungary for the tenth season in 2014 and Hainan Island, China the following year. This version was produced by Mistral Productions and has been broadcast in the majority of participating countries.

Country	Name	Host(s)	Channel	Broadcast
Algeria	Intervilles Algeria	Unknown	Canal Algérie	2015
Armenia	Լավագույներից Լավագույները (The Best of the Best)	Unknown	H2	2011
Belarus	Битва титанов (Clash of the Titans)	Lucia Lushchik; Evgeny Bulka; Dmitry Tankovych (2009); Olga Bogatyrevich	ONT	2009–2011
China	城市之间; Intercities (Between Cities)	Zhen Cheng	CCTV-5	2015
Czech Republic	Aréna národů (Arena of Nations)	Aleš Háma; Aleš Valenta	Prima televize	2012
Egypt	The Biggest Game Show in the World	Dalia Buhairi	MBC	2014
France	Intervilles International	Cécile de Ménibus; Joan Faggianelli	Gulli	2014–2016
Greece	The Biggest Game Show in the World	Nadia Boule	ANT1	2013–2014
Hungary	Játék határok nélkül (Game Without Borders)	Varga Edit; Harsányi Levente (2014); Gundel Takács Gábor (2015)	M1 (2014–15); Duna (2015–16)	2014–2016
Indonesia	The Biggest Game Show in the World Asia	Arie Untung	RCTI	2012, 2014
Kazakhstan	Namys Doda (Намыс дода)	Nurlan Koyanbayev	Qazaqstan	2007–2008, 2012, 2015
Philippines	The Biggest Game Show in the World Asia	Joey De Leon; Richard Gomez; Mr. Fu	TV5	2012
Romania	Saint-Tropez Games	Dan Negru	Antena 1	2006
Russia	Большие гонки (The Great Race)	Dmitry Nagiev (2005–2012); Kirill Nabutov (2014)	Channel One	2005–2012, 2014
Spain	Grand Prix Internacional	Antonio Montero Díaz	FORTA	2014
Thailand	The Biggest Game Show in the World Asia	Phoomjai Tangsanga	Channel 5	2012
Ukraine	Ігри патріотів (Patriot Games)	Pavel Kostitsyn	Inter; Megasport; First National	2005–2006
Ukraine	Битва націй (Battle of Nations)	Kuzma Skryabin; Grigory German (commentator)	ICTV	2011
Vietnam	The Biggest Game Show in the World Asia	Unknown	VTC 9	2012

== International adaptations ==
Intervilles has been adapted in several countries. These versions, separate from the European and international shows, include:

- Argentina: El Gran Juego de las Provincias (El Trece, 2006)
- Australia: Almost Anything Goes! (Network Ten, 1976–1978) and It's a Knockout (Network Ten, 1985–1987 and 2011–2012)
- Belgium and Netherlands: Zeakamp (BRT and NCRV, 1968–1987) and Stedenspel (EXQI Plus and NPO 3, 2010)
- China: national and winter shows were aired on CCTV
- Germany: Telematch (WDR (ARD), 1967–1980), Spielohne Grenzen (Das Erste, 1989) and Deutschland Champions (Das Erste, 2003–2004)
- Ivory Coast: Intervilles (RTI 1, 2014)
- Morocco: Intervilles (TVM, 2000)
- Portugal: Campeões Nacionais (SIC, 2003) and Todos Gostam do Verão (SIC, 2009)
- South Africa: Crazy Games (SABC 2, 2006) and Summer Games (SABC 2, 2007–2009)
- Spain: Cuando calienta el Sol (TVE1, 1995), El Grand Prix del verano (TVE1, 1996–2005, 2023–present; FORTA, 2007–2009), Peque Prix (TVE1, 1998–2000; Canal 9 and Telemadrid, 2007) and Grand Prix Xpress (CMMedia and Canal Extremadura, 2010–2011)
- Sweden: Stadskampen (TV4, 1997–2001 and 2005) and Postkodkampen (TV4, 2010–2011)
- United Kingdom: It's a Knockout (BBC1, 1966–1988; ITV, 1990; S4C (Wales), 1991–1994; Channel 5, 1999–2001), Anything Goes! (BBC1, 1984–1985), Fair Game (BBC1, 1985) and Simply the Best (ITV, 2004)
  - Northern Ireland: Town Challenge (BBC One Northern Ireland, 1997–2002)
  - Wales: Siarabang (S4C, 1989)
- United States: Almost Anything Goes (1975–1976) and Junior Almost Anything Goes! (1976–1977) aired on ABC, while All Star Anything Goes! (1977–1978) was syndicated.
- Vietnam: Trò chơi liên tỉnh (VTV3, 1996–1998)
