= The Biggest Game Show in the World =

The Biggest Game Show in the World may refer to:

- The Biggest Game Show in the World, or Intervilles International, a 2005–2016 international version of the 1962–2009 French show Intervilles
- The Biggest Game Show in the World Asia, a 2012 adaptation of Intervilles
- The Biggest Game Show in the World (Greek TV series), a 2013–2014 adaptation of Intervilles

== See also ==
- Jeux sans frontières, a 1965–1999 Europe-wide version of Intervilles
