= Jacki MacDonald =

Australian television presenter

- Born: Jenine MacDonald; 26 November 1953 (age 72); Blackall, Queensland, Australia
- Occupations: Television personality, radio personality
- Years active: 1975−present

Jacki MacDonald (born Jenine MacDonald; 26 November 1953) is a former Australian television personality from Blackall, Queensland, who also has worked in radio broadcasting.

== Career ==
Popular in her home state of Queensland, MacDonald appeared on a number of local programs in the 1970s including her own show, Jacki and all that Jazz and a nationwide children's program Happy Go 'Round on QTQ-9. On TVQ-0 she hosted a daily breakfast program, The Jacki Mac Show.

In 1978 she was GTV-9's replacement for Daryl Somers and puppet sidekick Ossie Ostrich when the pair moved to 0-10. After she presented The Super Saturday Show for several months, Somers returned to Nine and she was asked to join them as co-presenter of a revival of Hey Hey It's Saturday, a role which she would continue for nine years. MacDonald was frequently made the butt of jokes in the show and when she came on the tune "Folks Are Dumb Where I Come From" would often be played (a reference to MacDonald coming from Queensland). In 1984, the same year as HHIS's move from a local morning timeslot to a national primetime slot, MacDonald also hosted The Ossie Ostrich Video Show, a national weekday children's program on Nine.

For a short time MacDonald was also an anchor of TVQ-0's Eyewitness News bulletins in 1983, which made her one of the few presenters to appear for two different networks at the same time (in her case, the Nine and Ten networks).

During the 1970s and 1980s she won several TV Week Logie Awards for Most Popular Female Personality in Queensland.

MacDonald kept out of the spotlight following her departure from Hey Hey in 1988 (returning for two episodes in Brisbane in 1990). She returned to television in 1991 to host a season of Australia's Funniest Home Video Show after Graham Kennedy left. In 1992, former Hey Hey It's Saturday producer Gavan Disney approached her to co-host his new TV program Healthy Wealthy And Wise which was being produced for Network Ten. She continued with the new program for a couple of years before leaving television altogether. MacDonald appeared on the 2005 Network Ten special Seriously 40 which commemorated 40 years of Network Ten. On 7 October 2009 she made a guest appearance on the second Hey Hey reunion special. When Hey Hey returned as a series in 2010 she did two appearances. The first one was at a museum but the second she was very ill with the flu and used Skype to communicate. This was her last appearance.

MacDonald is now a regular show business commentator on Drive with Michael Smith for the Brisbane commercial talk radio station 4BC.

In 2022, Macdonald sold her Sunshine Beach retreat for $18.75 million after buying it for $535,000 in 1995.

She co-founded the popular Eat Street Northshore night market/food venue on the banks of the Brisbane River with Peter Hackworth, John Stainton and John Harrison.

== Awards and honours ==
- 1983 – Advance Australia Ambassador

== Personal life ==
MacDonald's sister, Fiona MacDonald, was a television presenter who was on local television in Queensland before going on national programs such as Wombat and the Australian version of It's a Knockout. Fiona MacDonald died in October 2024 after being diagnosed with Motor Neurone Disease (MND) in November 2021.

Jacki is married to Dr Michael Pitney, and they have three children.
