= It's a Knockout (Australian game show) =

1985–1987; 2011–2012 Australian TV series

- Genre: Game show
- Presented by: Original: Billy J. Smith; Fiona MacDonald; Reboot: HG Nelson; Charli Robinson; Brad McEwan
- Voices of: Max Rowley (1985–1987)
- Opening theme: "It's a Knockout" by Rick Turk
- Country of origin: Australia
- Original language: English
- No. of seasons: 3 (1985–1987); 1 (2011–2012)
- No. of episodes: 107 (1985–1987); 8 (2011–2012)

Production
- Production locations: Dural, New South Wales (1985–1987); Kuala Lumpur, Malaysia (2011–2012)
- Running time: 60 minutes
- Production companies: Grundy Television (1985–1987); Spring (2011–2012)

Original release
- Network: Network Ten
- Release: 17 April 1985 – 11 September 1987
- Release: 27 November 2011 – 20 January 2012

Related
- Almost Anything Goes

It's a Knockout is an Australian game show that was adapted from the original British version, which in turn was adapted from the French show, Intervilles. It originally ran from 17 April 1985 to 11 September 1987. It was later briefly revived albeit less successfully on 27 November 2011 on Network Ten and hosted by HG Nelson and Brad McEwan with Charli Robinson.

== History ==
An Australian version of It's a Knockout ran on Network Ten. Channel 7 Perth aired the series prior to Channel 10 arriving in Perth. The teams were divided by Australian states (New South Wales, Victoria, Queensland and South Australia) with each team being represented by members of an Apex Club in their home state or territory. Prize money was donated back to the club to fund projects in their local community. The show was hosted by Queensland-based personalities, including Billy J. Smith (1946–2019) and Fiona MacDonald (the sister of Hey Hey it's Saturday's Jacki MacDonald) with Max Rowley as announcer, for the duration that it aired in Australia. They would arrive to the show in a golf buggy with the show's mascot Combat the Dog (an Old English Sheepdog), and introduce the teams to compete in various athletic timed tasks. The show was filmed at Englefield Stadium in Dural, New South Wales, however due to numerous noise complaints from local residents the show was dropped in 1987.

This version also aired in Mexico on the TV cable network Multivisión and was a success during 1992, as well as the United States on KCAL-TV in Los Angeles and WWOR-TV in New York in 1990–91. It was also adapted and shown in Argentina, where it was known as Supermatch. This version was heavily edited, and the anchors were replaced by off-screen commentators. In Chile it was aired by La Red in the summer of 1992, known as Esto es Supermatch, and was based on the Argentinian version.

In the original series, an individual game win was awarded 4 points and second place 2 points (any ties were split between all tying teams). A nightly winner gave a team 6 points for the individual state ladder and $1,000 (first runners-up win 4 points and second runners-up win 2 points). After each team in each division played three times, the leading team in each state qualified for the semi-final worth $5,000. After each of the three semi-finals were conducted, the champions of each state qualified for the preliminary final worth $10,000. The same process was conducted again in pursuit of the teams for the grand final worth $20,000.

A famous feature of this run was called the "Joker" which was used by a team to double any points they could get in only one individual game. The use of the Joker was self-contained to the individual episode.

=== 2011/12 return ===
On 17 October 2011, it was announced that Channel 10 Australia was re-launching a new version of It's a Knockout for its 2011/12 Summer programming lineup hosted by HG Nelson, Charli Robinson and Brad McEwan. In each episode, Nelson and McEwan arrived on-set in a golf buggy and announced each team and the points tally, in addition to commentating each match whilst Charli introduced each game and explained the rules. Due to insurance costs however the show was recorded offshore in Kuala Lumpur, Malaysia, and it ran for eight 1-hour episodes and featured teams of 15 from each state of Australia. The teams competed for the Billy J. Smith cup as the grand prize. It premiered on 27 November 2011.
