= 2016 Ormoc local elections =

Philippine election

2016 Ormoc City mayoral election
| ← 2013 | May 9, 2016 | 2019 → |

| Nominee | Richard "Goma" Gomez | Edward "Ondo" Codilla | Mar Gallardo |
| Party | NPC | Liberal | Independent |
| Running mate | Leo Carmelo "Toto" Locsin, Jr. | Pedro Godiardo Ebcas | none |
| Popular vote | 53,234 | 44,453 | 608 |
| Percentage | 49.38 | 41.24 | 0.56 |
Mayor before election
Edward Codilla
Liberal
Elected mayor
Richard Gomez
NPC

Local elections in Ormoc City, Leyte were held on May 9, 2016, within the Philippine general election. The voters elected candidates for the elective local posts in the city: the mayor, vice mayor, and ten councilors.

== Background ==
Incumbent city mayor Edward Codilla ran for re-election to his post; he ran against an opponent in the 2013 election race, actor and sportsman Richard Gomez. Codilla ran under the Liberal Party, while Gomez ran under the Nationalist People's Coalition.

Codilla defeated Gomez, in the 2013 elections with a slim margin of 2,248 votes.

== Results ==
The candidates for mayor and vice mayor with the highest number of votes wins the seat; they are voted separately, therefore they may be of different parties when elected.

=== Mayoral Election ===
Parties are as stated in their certificate of candidacies. Edward Codilla is the incumbent.

Ormoc City Mayoral election
| Party | Candidate | Votes | % |
|---|---|---|---|
| NPC | Richard Gomez | 53,234 | 49.38% |
| Liberal | Edward Codilla | 44,453 | 41.24% |
| Independent | Mar Gallardo | 608 | 0.56% |
| Margin of victory | | 8,781 | 8.15% |
| Invalid or blank votes | | 9,499 | 8.81 |
| Total votes | | 107,794 | 100.00% |
| NPC gain from Liberal | | | |

=== Vice Mayoral Election ===
Parties are as stated in their certificate of candidacies. Leo Carmelo Locsin, Jr. is the incumbent. He switched parties for this election, from Liberal Party to Nationalist People's Coalition.

Ormoc City Vice Mayoral election
| Party | Candidate | Votes | % |
|---|---|---|---|
| NPC | Leo Carmelo Locsin, Jr. | 53,098 | 49.26% |
| Liberal | Pedro Godiardo Ebcas | 38,103 | 35.35% |
| Margin of victory | | 14,995 | 13.91% |
| Invalid or blank votes | | 16,593 | 15.39 |
| Total votes | | 107,794 | 100.00% |
| NPC gain from Liberal | | | |

=== City Council Election ===
Voters elected ten councilors to comprise the City Council or the Sangguniang Panlungsod. Candidates are voted for separately so winning candidates may come from different political parties. The ten candidates with the highest number of votes win the seats. For the tickets, names that are italicized were incumbents seeking reelection.

==== Liberal Party/Codilla Ticket ====
Liberal Party/Codilla Ticket
| Name | Party |
|---|---|
| Jay-R Aparis | Liberal |
| Caplea Capuyan-Villar | Liberal |
| Antonio Codilla | Liberal |
| Ando Conejos | Liberal |
| Conrad Conopio | Liberal |
| Boy Laurente | Liberal |
| Menoy Maglasang | Liberal |
| Joel Marson | Liberal |
| Melbur Melgazo | Liberal |
| Dodjie Omega | Liberal |

==== Nationalist People's Coalition/Gomez Ticket ====
Nationalist People's Coalition/Gomez Ticket
| Name | Party |
|---|---|
| Bebe Laurente | NPC |
| Jasper Lucero | NPC |
| Gerry Penserga | NPC |
| Bennet Pongos | NPC |
| Nolitz Quilang | NPC |
| Vince Rama | NPC |
| Mayong Rodriguez | NPC |
| Tommy Serafica | NPC |
| Lando Villasencio | NPC |
| Goito Yrastorza | NPC |

Ormoc City Council election
| Party | Candidate | Votes | % |
|---|---|---|---|
| NPC | Lando Villasencio | 48,654 | 6.34% |
| NPC | Vince Rama | 47,025 | 6.13% |
| NPC | Mayong Rodriguez | 46,319 | 6.04% |
| NPC | Tommy Serafica | 45,396 | 5.92% |
| NPC | Bennet Pongos | 45,216 | 5.90% |
| NPC | Gerry Penserga | 40,562 | 5.29% |
| NPC | Goito Yrastorza | 40,204 | 5.24% |
| NPC | Nolitz Quilang | 38,820 | 5.06% |
| Liberal | Jay-R Aparis | 38,342 | 5.00% |
| Liberal | Caplea Capuyan-Villar | 37,821 | 4.93% |
| NPC | Jasper Lucero | 37,571 | 4.90% |
| NPC | Bebe Laurente | 37,025 | 4.83% |
| Liberal | Ando Conejos | 36,105 | 4.71% |
| Liberal | Antonio Codilla | 34,092 | 4.45% |
| Liberal | Boy Laurente | 33,923 | 4.42% |
| Liberal | Menoy Maglasang | 31,643 | 4.13% |
| Liberal | Conrad Conopio | 31,471 | 4.10% |
| Liberal | Dodjie Omega | 31,002 | 4.04% |
| Liberal | Joel Marson | 30,739 | 4.01% |
| Liberal | Melbur Melgazo | 30,711 | 4.00% |
| Independent | Victor Perez | 4,251 | 0.55% |
| Total votes | | 766,892 | 100.00% |
