= Telematch =

German Game Show

Telematch is the name given to a group of syndicated episodes from the West German television series Spiel ohne Grenzen, originally broadcast on the WDR (Westdeutscher Rundfunk Köln) channel from 1967 until 1980 and produced by Transtel. Although the Spiel ohne Grenzen programme ran from 1967, only forty-three episodes were syndicated and transmitted under the title Telematch.

== Format ==
It was based on its French counterpart Intervilles and originally consisted of a match between teams from two West German towns, except for the last three years' matches (1978–1980), which were contested between five towns. The match composed of several games in which the participants would typically dress up in costumes. Often the costumes were elaborate and designed to increase the challenge of the game by making movement awkward. Games were played against the clock, or as a race.

== Broadcast ==
It was dubbed into English, Hindi, Arabic, French, Spanish, and Malay.

It was shown in Saudi Arabia, Argentina, Chile, China, Colombia, Ghana, Ecuador, Kuwait, Iraq, Egypt, El Salvador, Guatemala, Honduras, Venezuela, Bolivia, Paraguay, Peru, Costa Rica, Cuba, Puerto Rico, Panama, Dominican Republic, Kenya, Nigeria, Sudan, Malaysia, India, Singapore (from 1972), Sri Lanka, Togo, Turkey, Uruguay and Vietnam.

== See also ==
- It's a Knockout
- Jeux sans frontières
- El Grand Prix del verano
