= It's a Knockout =

British TV game show (1966–2001)

- Genre: Game show
- Created by: Guy Lux
- Based on: Intervilles
- Presented by: McDonald Hobley; David Vine; Stuart Hall; Bernie Clifton; Iestyn Garlick; Nia Chiswell; Keith Chegwin; Lucy Alexander
- Starring: Ted Ray; Charlie Chester; McDonald Hobley; Katie Boyle; Eddie Waring
- Judges: Referees: Arthur Edward Ellis; Frank Bruno; Scorekeeper: Nell McAndrew
- Opening theme: "Bean Bag"
- Ending theme: "Bean Bag"
- Composer: Herb Alpert and the Tijuana Brass
- Country of origin: United Kingdom
- Original language: English
- No. of series: 23 (Note: Seventeen on BBC1, four on S4C, and two on Channel 5.)
- No. of episodes: 342 (Note: 272 on BBC1, one on ITV, 45 on S4C, and 24 on Channel 5.)

Production
- Running time: 30–120 minutes
- Production companies: BBC Manchester (BBC); TVS (ITV); Ronin TV (Channel 5)

Original release
- Network: BBC1
- Release: 7 August 1966 – 25 December 1988
- Network: ITV
- Release: 28 May 1990
- Network: S4C
- Release: 29 June 1991 – 23 December 1994
- Network: Channel 5
- Release: 3 September 1999 – 6 January 2001

Related
- Jeux sans frontières It's a Knockout (Australia); Top Town

It's a Knockout! is a British game show first broadcast in 1966. It was adapted from the French show Intervilles, which itself was based on a previous Italian programme and was part of the international Jeux sans frontières ("Games Without Frontiers") franchise.

== History ==
The series was broadcast on BBC1 from 7 August 1966 to 30 July 1982; thereafter a number of specials were broadcast until 25 December 1988. An episode was made by TVS for ITV which aired on 28 May 1990 as part of its ITV Telethon that year with Bernie Clifton as the host.

=== Welsh version ===
A Welsh version, Gemau Heb Ffiniau (Games without Frontiers), was broadcast from 29 June 1991 to 23 December 1994 on S4C. It had Welsh teams battling against European contestants dressed in pink colours. Nia Chiswell and Iestyn Garlick presented. Locations included Bodelwyddan Castle, with Nia dressed as Alice in Wonderland. The series won a BAFTA Cymru award in 1994.

The series was later re-dubbed into English by Stuart Hall and broadcast on The Family Channel, from 1993 to 1994.

=== Channel 5 version ===
In April 1999, Channel 5 bought the rights to the show, and started filming on 15 August in Reading, Berkshire with new presenters Keith Chegwin and Lucy Alexander, alongside referee Frank Bruno and scorekeeper Nell McAndrew.

The series returned from 3 September 1999 to 6 January 2001 for two series, produced by Richard Hearsey and Ronin Entertainment, and used consultants and games from the French production. It was developed for Channel 5 with Alan Nixon, and the first show featured Stuart Hall tied up with rope in his garage wishing the new presenters well with the series. As in the previous versions, the theme tune was "Bean Bag" by Herb Alpert and the Tijuana Brass.

On 20 April 2001, it was announced that a third series would not be produced and that it would be replaced by two new challenge game shows, The Desert Forges and Under Pressure.

== Format ==
Originally broadcast live and stylized as It's a Knock-out!, the first hosts were David Vine and Katie Boyle. Boyle was replaced by McDonald Hobley after 1968. The games were originally refereed by rugby league commentator Eddie Waring and later, when Waring became co-host with Vine, former international football referee Arthur Ellis from 1969 to 1982. Vine was replaced by Stuart Hall in 1973. Teams representing a town or city complete tasks in absurd games, often dressed in large foam rubber suits. Games were played in the home town's park, with weather often turning grassland into mud. The team scoring most points would advance to the next stage. Teams could double points in one round by choosing to "play their Joker".

=== The games ===
The games were described as school sports day for adults. For example, teams would carry buckets of water over greasy poles or rolling logs. Other teams would interfere, squirting water cannon or throwing custard pies. Limited budgets meant games were often a variation on what could be done with a long piece of elastic, a lot of water, a portable swimming pool and a roundabout.

In its earliest form, the show emphasised skill or organisation applied in a bizarre way, for instance picking up eggs with an industrial excavator, as well as traditional village sports such as climbing a greasy pole. Games of strength were included, for example, carrying a Mini Moke without wheels. From the beginning, a "mini-marathon" would run the length of the programme, with updates on progress between shorter contests. The shift to spectacular displays, with or without costumes, came later, to improve audience appeal and to follow continental traditions.

A recurring event in early episodes was "piano smashing" where the teams had to break up an old upright piano with sledgehammers into small enough pieces to push through an aperture shaped like a large letterbox. The event drew regular complaints from viewers who did not like to see pianos end in this way. The complaints eventually drove the managing director of BBC Television Huw Wheldon to have the event withdrawn.

From the 1975 series onwards, three teams competed each week. Prior to that, two teams would go head-to-head in each edition.

The winning team in each event scored three points, the second-place finisher scored two, and the third-place team scored one. Each team was given a joker card, which they could play before any one event to double the points they scored for it.

The winner of each edition was awarded an It's a Knockout! trophy and a chance to represent the UK in Jeux sans frontières. Three local teams appeared in the UK show, with around 6 to 8 countries competing in the European finals.

== In other countries ==
=== Europe ===
The format of It's a Knockout! was used in many European countries, with each version forwarding teams for the international version, Jeux sans frontières.

In the United Kingdom, participants came from the heats of It's a Knockout. The original presenter was McDonald Hobley, but he stayed for just one series before handing over to Katie Boyle, who in turn was replaced by David Vine and Eddie Waring. It was not until 1972 that the presenter most associated with the role, Stuart Hall, took over presenting the UK heats and also provided the British commentary for the international version along with Waring, who was better known as the BBC's Rugby League commentator.

Wales had its own team between 1991 and 1994 and the programme was broadcast on S4C in Welsh by Iestyn Garlick and Nia Chiswell.

=== Australia ===
Almost Anything Goes! aired in Australia from 1976 to 1978. It was hosted by Tim Evans and Brendan Edwards and featured Sean Kramer and Australian Rules player Ron Barassi. It was filmed in Melbourne. The 1976 season featured two complete competitions with initial heats and finals, while the 1977 and 1978 seasons featured only one each. Following the 1977 grand final, the season finale featured a competition between the top two teams from the grand final and a team representing New Zealand.

An Australian version of It's a Knockout! ran on Network Ten from 1985 to 1987. The teams were divided into the Australian states: New South Wales, Victoria, Queensland and South Australia. The show was hosted by Billy J. Smith, along with Fiona MacDonald for the duration that it aired in Australia. They would arrive to the show in a golf buggy. The show was filmed in a field in Dural, New South Wales, but due to numerous complaints from local residents, the show was dropped in 1987. This version aired in Mexico on the TV Cable Network Multivisión and was a success in 1992, and also in the U.S. on KCAL-TV in Los Angeles & WWOR-TV in New York in 1990–91. It was also adapted and shown in Argentina as Supermatch. This version was heavily edited, and the anchors were replaced by off-screen commentators.

In October 2011, it was announced that Channel 10 Australia would re-launch a new version of It's a Knockout! for its 2011–12 summer programming line-up hosted by HG Nelson, Charli Robinson and Brad McEwan. Due to insurance costs, the show was filmed in Kuala Lumpur, Malaysia, and ran for eight 1-hour episodes between December 2011 and January 2012 and featured teams of 15 from each state of Australia.

=== New Zealand ===
In New Zealand, a series based on It's a Knockout! called Top Town ran from 1976 to 1990, and was revived in 2009.

=== United States: Almost Anything Goes! ===
The American version of It's a Knockout!, re-titled Almost Anything Goes!, by Bob Banner, aired on ABC in the United States from 31 July to 28 August 1975. It won the time slot on Thursday nights against reruns of The Waltons on CBS and a short-lived Ben Vereen variety show (Comin' at Ya!) on NBC.

In the first season, there were four regional events (North, East, South, and West); each had teams representing cities with populations of 20,000 or smaller from three different states, and each city had to be within 200 miles of the other two. The four winners then met in a national final. The second season consisted of 14 episodes, broken up into nine episodes where all three cities were from a particular state, three regional finals (East, South, and West – there was no North regional in the second season) consisting of three state winners, a national final consisting of the three regional winners, and a "Supergames" where the second season winner competed against the first season winner and a team of celebrities representing Hollywood.

For its second season (24 January to 2 May 1976), AAG! moved to Saturday nights after the cancellation of the short-lived Saturday Night Live with Howard Cosell variety show. Sports announcers Charlie Jones and Lynn Shackelford were the play-by-play and color men on this version which featured small towns across America playing the games. Sam Riddle, who was one of the producers, served as field reporter in 1975 along with Dick Whittington, the latter being replaced by Regis Philbin in 1976.

Boulder City, Nevada, won the 1975 series and Chambersburg, Pennsylvania, won the 1976 series. In a showdown, Boulder City beat Chambersburg and a celebrity all-star team (the "Hollywood Tinsel Towners"). However, it was up against The Jeffersons and Doc on CBS and Emergency! on NBC, and was shortly cancelled thereafter due to low ratings.

A children's version, called Junior Almost Anything Goes! and hosted by Soupy Sales, ran on Saturday mornings from 11 September 1976 to 4 September 1977. A syndicated celebrity version (All Star Anything Goes!) hosted by Bill Boggs ran from 16 September 1977 to September 1978. Tony DeFranco of The DeFranco Family performed the theme song for the All Star Anything Goes syndicated show.

== Charity specials ==
Two charity specials were made in the 1980s. The Grand Knockout Tournament of 1987 (also called It's a Royal Knockout) featured four teams of celebrities, each figureheaded by a member of the British royal family. The event, held at the Alton Towers theme park, was widely derided as a failure, particularly in terms of public perception of the royal family.

In 1988 brought It's a Charity Knockout!. Games took place around Walt Disney World Resort in Florida, US, and featured celebrity teams representing Australia, UK and US.

== Pop culture ==
Jeux sans frontières was the inspiration for Peter Gabriel's hit song "Games Without Frontiers". The words "Jeux Sans Frontieres" are repeated as the chorus of the song by Kate Bush, and the phrase "it's a knockout!" is used in the song as well.

The show was also featured prominently in The Goodies and the Beanstalk as a motive for the Goodies to climb the giant beanstalk; the grand prize was 5,000 puppies.

In 1973 Blue Peter presenters John Noakes, Peter Purves and Lesley Judd participated in some of the games.

== Transmissions ==
=== BBC1 ===
Series	Start date	End date	Episodes
1	7 August 1966	18 September 1966	7
2	14 May 1967	6 September 1967	12
3	12 May 1968	13 September 1968	13
4	14 May 1969	3 September 1969	11
5	30 April 1970	18 September 1970	14
6	21 April 1971	24 September 1971	14
7	19 May 1972	29 September 1972	14
8	18 May 1973	14 September 1973	14
9	3 May 1974	20 September 1974	13
10	23 May 1975	15 October 1975	15
11	21 May 1976	1 October 1976	16
12	22 April 1977	2 November 1977	16
13	21 April 1978	8 November 1978	16
14	11 May 1979	6 November 1979	17
15	9 May 1980	10 October 1980	17
16	29 May 1981	6 November 1981	15
17	28 May 1982	29 October 1982	15

==== Specials ====
Date	Title
26 December 1970	It's a Christmas Knockout! 1
8 May 1971	It's a Cup Final Knockout! 1
27 December 1971	It's a Christmas Knockout! 2
6 May 1972	It's a Cup Final Knockout! 2
26 December 1972	It's a Christmas Knockout! 3
5 May 1973	It's a Cup Final Knockout! 3
26 December 1973	It's a Christmas Knockout! 4
4 May 1974	It's a Cup Final Knockout! 4
23 December 1974	It's a Christmas Knockout! 5
3 May 1975	It's a Cup Final Knockout! 5
11 July 1975	It's a Celebrity Knockout! 1
26 December 1975	It's a Christmas Knockout! 6
1 May 1976	It's a Cup Final Knockout! 6
9 July 1976	It's a Celebrity Knockout! 2
26 December 1976	It's a Christmas Knockout! 7
21 May 1977	It's a Cup Final Knockout! 7
16 August 1977	It's a Celebrity Knockout! 3
26 December 1977	It's a Christmas Knockout! 8
14 April 1978	It's a Miners' Knockout!
21 August 1978	It's a Celebrity Knockout! 4
26 December 1978	It's a Christmas Knockout! 9
29 August 1979	It's a Celebrity Knockout! 5
24 December 1979	It's a Christmas Knockout! 10
11 July 1980	It's a Celebrity Knockout! 6
27 December 1980	It's a Christmas Knockout! 11
31 August 1981	It's a Celebrity Knockout! 7
2 January 1982	It's a Christmas Knockout! 12
30 August 1982	The Knockout Star Gala 1
29 August 1983	The Knockout Star Gala 2
27 December 1983	It's a Christmas Knockout! 13
28 December 1984	It's a Christmas Knockout! 14
19 June 1987	The Grand Knockout Tournament
25 December 1988	It's a Charity Knockout from Walt Disney World!

=== ITV ===
Date	Title
28 May 1990	It's a Telethon Knockout!

=== S4C ===
Series	Start date	End date	Episodes
1	29 June 1991	14 September 1991	11
2	4 July 1992	19 September 1992	11
3	26 June 1993	11 September 1993	11
4	25 June 1994	10 September 1994	11

==== Specials ====
Date	Title
23 December 1994	It's a Christmas Knockout

=== Channel 5 ===
Series	Start date	End date	Episodes
1	3 September 1999	6 November 1999	11
2	14 October 2000	6 January 2001	13

== See also ==
- Telematch, the German abridged version of 43 Spiel Ohne Grenzen (Games Without Borders) domestic qualifying programmes, in turn, the German adaptation of Intervilles.
- Supermatch, in Argentina, broadcast on Telefe.
- El Grand Prix del verano, in Spain
- Simply the Best, another UK adaptation, broadcast on ITV in 2004.
- Bigheads, another UK adaptation, hosted by Jason Manford with Kris Akabusi and Jenny Powell on ITV in 2017.
