= Transtel =

Transtel may refer to:

- Transtel, a former company and a label used by German public broadcasters as an international distributor of TV programs, now part of Deutsche Welle
- Transtel, a former operating division of Transnet in South Africa. Transtel merged to become Neotel, which is now part of Liquid Telecom Group.
- Transtel Togo, the original name for Air Horizon, an African airline
