= Piem =

Piem may refer to:

- Piem (cartoonist) (1923 – 2020), French cartoonist
- Piem, a type of mnemonic technique (a poem about pi = π = 3.1415926535…)
