= Nagsimula sa Puso =

- Intertitle
- Also known as: It Started from the Heart
- Genre: Drama, Romance
- Created by: ABS-CBN Studios; Rondel P. Lindayag
- Based on: Nagsimula sa Puso (1990) by Mel Chionglo
- Developed by: ABS-CBN Studios
- Written by: Honey Hidalgo; Arlene Tamayo; Michiko Yamamoto
- Directed by: Malu L. Sevilla; Ruel S. Bayani; Darnel Joy R. Villaflor
- Starring: Maja Salvador; Coco Martin; Nikki Gil; Jason Abalos
- Theme music composer: Jessie Lasaten
- Opening theme: "Kung Alam Mo Lang" by Jed Madela
- Country of origin: Philippines
- Original language: Filipino
- No. of episodes: 75

Production
- Executive producers: Carlo Katigbak; Cory Vidanes; Laurenti Dyogi; Roldeo Endrinal
- Producers: Carlina D. Dela Merced; Maya Manuel-Aralar; Joyce Rosina L. Enriquez; Dagang Vilbar; Julie Anne R. Benitez
- Production location: Metro Manila
- Running time: 30 minutes
- Production companies: Dreamscape Entertainment Television; CCM Creatives

Original release
- Network: ABS-CBN
- Release: October 12, 2009 – January 22, 2010

Nagsimula sa Puso (International title: It Started From the Heart / transl. It Began in the Heart) is a Philippine television drama romance series broadcast by ABS-CBN. The series is based on the 1990 Philippine film of the same title. Directed by Malu L. Sevilla, Ruel S. Bayani and Darnel Joy R. Villaflor, it stars Maja Salvador, Coco Martin, Nikki Gil, and Jason Abalos. It aired on the network's Hapontastic lineup and worldwide on TFC from October 12, 2009 to January 22, 2010, replacing Kambal sa Uma and was replaced by Magkano ang Iyong Dangal?.

== Overview ==
=== Original film ===
The original film was released in March 27, 1990, by Vision Films (predecessor of Star Cinema). It starred Hilda Koronel, Richard Gomez, Jay Ilagan, and Cherie Gil. It was directed by Mel Chionglo and written by Ricky Lee.

The film is digitally restored and remastered by the ABS-CBN Film Archives and Central Digital Lab and it was released in 2015.

=== Production ===
After the success of Sineserye Presents, ABS-CBN decided to make a new afternoon drama. Nagsimula Sa Puso was a 1990 film which earned Richard Gomez his first FAMAS awards and nominations. Richard Gomez played the role of a young college student in a heated affair with his college professor played by Hilda Koronel, who attempts revenge after being stricken with grief and resentment by his professor's mother, and takes revenge on his professor's now settled family only to obtain her for himself.

Throughout its press conference, Maja Salvador takes the lead as Hilda Koronel's character Celina Hernandez, a role which Maja analyzed carefully when offered the project. She allowed herself to play the character as she wanted to experience a different role from previous projects. After mostly playing adult roles on various episodes of MMK, she decided to take the lead and do a love scene with film and TV actor Coco Martin who was recently in the TV series on the same year Tayong Dalawa before Nagsimula Sa Puso's debut on October 12, 2009. The series revolved around Gloria Diaz, Jaclyn Jose and Buboy Garovillo with newcomers; Nikki Gil and Joseph Bitangcol as well as a special participation of actress and film director Laurice Guilllen.

== Story and development ==
Celina Fernandez, a young college professor whose life has always been controlled by her mom, Minda (Jacklyn Jose). The latter puts such high hopes on her to the point that she is forced to live her dreams—that is to find a husband who’ll keep her future secure. But she couldn’t take more of Minda’s unyielding influence. So as an act of defiance, Celina not only rejects her rich boyfriend, Jim(Jason Abalos) offer to take her with him abroad but also his marriage proposal. To make matters worse, her professional life also turns upside down starting the day she meets engineering scholar Carlo Pagdanganan (Coco Martin). She instantly dislikes him for coming in late during their first day of classes and for making her look incompetent in front of the dean who’s very lenient with him. But what happens when she gets to know him more as a person? Would she ever consider falling in love with her own student?

== Cast and characters ==
=== Main cast ===
- Maja Salvador as Celina Fernandez
- Coco Martin as Carlo Pagdanganan†
- Nikki Gil as Julie Bernardo
- Jason Abalos as Jim Ortega

=== Supporting cast ===
- Jaclyn Jose as Minda Fernandez
- Buboy Garovillo as Tony Ortega
- Gloria Diaz as Pinky Ortega
- Irma Adlawan as Liza Bernardo
- Ronnie Lazaro as Mario Bernardo
- Joseph Bitangcol as Eugene Ventado
- Maliksi Morales as Jimbo Ortega
- Niña Jose as Charie
- Bea Nicolas as Ana
- Kakai Bautista as Missy

=== Guest cast ===
- Laurice Guillen as Teresa Pagdanganan†
- Boom Labrusca as Oliver
- Frenchie Dy as Franchesca
- Jordan Castillo as Roger
- Kris Martinez as Jon-Jon
- Max Reyes as Dino
- Acey Aquino as Sharlyn

=== Trivia ===
- After recognizing Coco Martin's talent, ABS-CBN Management and Director of Hit Primetime Dramas Iisa Pa Lamang (2008) and Tayong Dalawa (2009), Ruel Santos Bayani gave him a big break to direct Nagsimula Sa Puso.
- The theme song is "Kung Alam Mo Lang" by Jed Madela, later re-interpreted by Maricris Garcia as the theme song of the titled Kakambal ni Eliana on GMA Network in 2013.
- This is the first time Coco Martin portrays a role based on Richard Gomez's movie role. The former would later portray another role of the latter in the 2012 hit series, Walang Hanggan, based on Hihintayin Kita Sa Langit.

== Awards and recognitions ==
- It was recognized and nominated Favorite Afternoon Drama with other top rating ABS-CBN Afternoon Soaps such as Gilda Olvidado's Magkano ang Iyong Dangal? and Jim Fernandez's Kambal sa Uma in the 23rd PMPC for Favorite Afternoon Drama.

== Re-runs ==
The show began airing re-runs on Jeepney TV from May 16 to August 26, 2022 (replacing the re-runs of Mirabella and was replaced by the re-runs of Kahit Puso'y Masugatan); and from May 4 to June 26, 2026 (replacing the re-runs of Precious Hearts Romances Presents: Hiyas and was replaced by the re-runs of We Will Survive).

== See also ==
- List of programs broadcast by ABS-CBN
- List of ABS-CBN Studios original drama series
- List of programs broadcast by Jeepney TV
