= Billy J. Smith =

Australian television and radio presenter

- Born: William John Smith; 4 January 1946; Brisbane, Queensland, Australia
- Died: 27 February 2019 (aged 73); Brisbane, Queensland, Australia
- Occupations: radio presenter, television host, producer, sportscaster
- Years active: 1965−2012
- Known for: rugby league commentary, radio announcing, hosting TV shows
- Television: It's a Knockout, The Footy Show, Sportscene, Eyewitness News

William John Smith (4 January 1946 – 27 February 2019) was an Australian television and radio presenter.

He is best known for hosting the national locailzed version of British game show It's a Knockout as well as for his rugby league commentary.

== Radio ==
Smith began his radio career at 4LG in Longreach, Queensland where he adopted "Billy J. Smith" as his on-air moniker after the station manager's reluctance in having someone simply called "Bill Smith" on air. Smith then went to 4LM in Mount Isa before returning to Brisbane where his profile grew during stints at 4IP (becoming one of "The Good Guys") and 4BK during the 1970s and 1980s.

At 4BK, Smith would commentate on rugby league games at Lang Park while on top of a cherry picker on the other side of the boundary fence, in violation of the exclusive rights deal struck between Queensland Rugby League and an opposing radio station. This caused friction between Smith and the QRL's Ron McAuliffe, a dispute which would resurface during preliminary discussions about a potential State of Origin series between Queensland and New South Wales.

His radio career continued into the next century and in 2007 was named as the host of Sports Today on 4BC.

== Television ==
Smith's television career began in the 1960s on TVQ hosting a game show called The Numbers Game. In 1973, he hosted Sportscene on BTQ for five years from 1973.

In the late 1970s, Smith took a break from radio and television and went to work for International Sports Management, owned by Barry Maranta. It was there where Smith helped Maranta instigate a State of Origin series for rugby league after studying an Australian rules football state of origin match in Perth in 1978. This led to Smith notably called the very first State of Origin game as a rugby league commentator for Channel 7 at Lang Park in 1980 as well as early Brisbane Broncos games.

From 1985, Smith co-hosted the national game show It's a Knockout with Fiona MacDonald on Network 10 which was filmed on location at Dural in New South Wales until noise complaints from local residents shut down production in 1987. It is this role he is arguably most remembered for. A 2011 revival offered "The Billy J. Smith Cup" as its grand prize.

Throughout the 1980s, Smith was a sports presenter for TV0 Eyewitness News on TVQ but was let go from the station in 1989, reportedly to allow the station to budget for the arrival of new news presenter Bruce Paige in 1990.

Smith was the host of the first local Queensland edition of The Footy Show which went to air on QTQ on 17 March 1994. Smith was later replaced by Chris Bombolas before the program was later axed in favour of the station taking the Sydney version of The Footy Show.

== Death ==
Smith suffered serious head injuries during a fall in Caxton Street on 26 February 2019.

He didn't regain consciousness and died at the Royal Brisbane and Women's Hospital on 27 February 2019 when his family turned off his life support machine.

His funeral was held on 8 March 2019 at Holy Spirit Church in New Farm, attended by an array of notable sportspeople and media personalities. The theme song from It's a Knockout played at the conclusion of the service.

After his death, he was posthumously inducted into Lang Park's Media Hall of Fame by Queensland sports minister Mick de Brenni.
