= Piem (cartoonist) =

French designer (1923–2020)

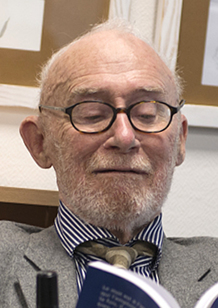
- Piem in 2016
- Born: Pierre de Barrigue de Montvallon; 12 November 1923; Saint-Étienne, France
- Died: 12 November 2020 (aged 97); Notre-Dame-d'Oé, France
- Occupation: Designer

Pierre de Barrigue de Montvallon (12 November 1923 – 12 November 2020), known professionally as Piem, was a French designer.

== Biography ==
Piem was the son of Serge de Montvallon, director of the Maison de la chimie, and Madeleine Champavère. He was also the brother of Robert de Montvalon. On 22 August 1947, he married Élisabeth Lefebvre, who came from a family of industrialists from Roubaix. He had six children with Élisabeth (three sons, three daughters), including Thierry, who took the pseudonym Barrigue after becoming a cartoonist, and Christophe, a key figure in the foundation of the genealogy website Geneanet. Around 1953, he became the godfather of Philippe Bouvard.

After his secondary studies at the École Massillon, de Montvallon graduated from the École nationale supérieure des Beaux-Arts and the École Paul-Colin. He began working as a cartoonist and a painter, where he displayed leftist ideals. After World War II, he worked as a "decorator corporal" in Trier. In 1947, he began to contribute to Témoignage chrétien and Le Figaro, and readers of Le Point and La Croix also had access to his drawings. He then joined the Syndicat national des journalistes. He became known to the general public after appearing in the television program Le Petit Rapporteur, where Jacques Martin called him "the ancestor", although he was just 51 years old. He also appeared in La Lorgnette in 1977 and 1978. He was known to smoke a pipe, and was able to during his appearances on Le Petit Rapporteur.

Upon his retirement, Piem moved to Notre-Dame-d'Oé, where he was elected as a municipal councillor and continued to smoke a pipe. His life and career were summarized by French Minister of Culture Renaud Donnedieu de Vabres in a speech given on 14 January 2005, in which Piem was promoted to a Commander of the Ordre des Arts et des Lettres.

The pen name Piem was created from his first name (Pierre) and his last name (Montvallon). He would joke that it came from the words "Prodigieux, Irrésistible, Extraordinaire, Modeste".

Piem died in Notre-Dame-d'Oé on his 97th birthday, 12 November 2020.

== Publications ==
=== With Éditions Cherche midi ===
- Les Mordus de l’automobile (1988)
- Les Mordus du foot (1992)
- Au revoir et encore merci (1993)
- Bonne santé, mode d’emploi (1994)
- Les Mordus du tennis (1994)
- Petits enfants grands parents, mode d’emploi (1994)
- Enfants Parents, mode d'emloi (1995)
- Dieu et vous (1996)
- Les Gendarmes (1997)
- L’École (1998)
- Je t’aime (1999)
- Les Accrocs du portable (2000)
- Souvenirs d’un libraire (2002)
- L’argent, encore plus (2003)
- Les Joies de la retraite (2004)
- Mon stress, mon psy et moi (2004)
- Deuxième abécédaire de la dérision (2007)
- Troisième abécédaire de la dérision (2007)
- J’aime La Poste (2008)
- La terre jusqu’au trognon (2009)
- Le petit Piem illustré (2010)
- Généalogiquement vôtre, liberté, égalité, hérédité (2013)

=== With Other Editors ===
- Un trait ... C'est tout (1972)
- À la petite semaine (1975)
- Aux larmes, citoyens (1976)
- Dipapacequoi (1977)
- La France et les Français (1979)
- Les Mordus du tennis (1984)
- Cent dessins choisis (1984)
- Les Mordus du foot (1985)
- Un cœur gros comme ça (1986)
- Les Mordus du ski (1987)
- Les Mordus de l'automobile (1988)
- Petits enfants grands parents, mode d’emploi (1989)
- Santé, mode d'emploi (1991)
- Piem se met à table (1994)
- Les Mordus du ballon rond (1998)
- Vive la retraite (2001)
- L'Ombre et la grâce (2004)

== Television ==
- Tac au tac (1969–1975)
- Le Petit Rapporteur (1975–1976)
- La Lorgnette (1977)

== Distinctions ==
- Knight of the Legion of Honour (2001)
- Knight of Ordre national du Mérite (Officer in 2008), (Commander in 2016)
- Commander of the Ordre des Arts et des Lettres (2005)
- Honorary Member of the Confrérie des fumeurs de pipes de Morez et de Saint-Claude
