= Happy Go 'Round =

Happy Go Round is a 1970s Australian nationwide children's television series created by QTQ-9 Brisbane, Queensland, starring Darlene Joyce Steinhardt (now Darlene Zschech), Darren Ormsby, Jenny Andrews, Leigh Muirhead, Terry Stewart, David Napier, Cindy Byron (now Cinderella Potts Abrams), Donna Stanley and Joanne Stanley. It aired between 1976 and 1978.

It was hosted by Jacki McDonald in the years before she joined the cast of Hey Hey It's Saturday, and was the first Australian children's show to receive the "C" rating for high quality children's programming.
