= Akin ang Pangarap Mo =

Philippine drama film

- Directed by: Laurice Guillen
- Screenplay by: Olivia M. Lamasan
- Story by: Nerissa G. Cabral
- Produced by: William C. Leary
- Starring: Dina Bonnevie; Dawn Zulueta; Richard Gomez; Tonton Gutierrez
- Cinematography: Eduardo Jacinto
- Edited by: Efren Jarlego
- Music by: Willy Cruz
- Production company: Viva Films
- Distributed by: Viva Films
- Release date: May 20, 1992
- Running time: 108 minutes
- Country: Philippines
- Language: Filipino

Akin ang Pangarap Mo (English: Your Dream is Mine) is a 1992 Philippine drama film directed by Laurice Guillen from a screenplay written by Olivia M. Lamasan, based on the comics serial of the same name by Nerissa G. Cabral. The film stars Dina Bonnevie, Dawn Zulueta, Richard Gomez and Tonton Gutierrez.

== Plot ==
Leo (Richard), who is engaged to Anita (Dawn) out of convenience, falls in love with Gigi (Dina), whom he met on his family farm. Little did he know that her seduction will soon destroy his relationship with Anita.

== Cast ==
- Dina Bonnevie as Gigi
  - Miriam Reina Mendoza as Young Gigi
- Dawn Zulueta as Anita Bautista
  - Noreen Aguas as Young Anita
- Richard Gomez as Leo Hidalgo
- Tonton Gutierrez as Myron Castillo
- Daria Ramirez as Amanda Bautista
- Johnny Delgado as Martin Bautista
- Eddie Rodriguez as Don Lorenzo
- Tommy Abuel as Atty. Ramon Castillo
- Dexter Doria as Diding
- Joe Mari Avellana as Badong

== Production ==
Rustom Padilla was originally cast in the film, but was unable to attend due to his ongoing contract with the Philippine Airlines as a flight steward which expired the previous year. Tonton Gutierrez eventually took over his role.

== Reception ==
Justino Dormiendo of the Manila Standard gave Akin ang Pangarap Mo a negative review. He criticized the performances of the main stars but praised those of the supporting stars. He also criticized Laurice Guillen's "sleek, but subservient" direction and the film's complex story.
