= Nagsimula sa Puso (film) =

1990 melodrama film by Mel Chionglo

- Directed by: Mel Chionglo
- Written by: Ricky Lee
- Based on: Nagsimula sa Puso, a DZRH radio drama by Salvador M. Royales
- Produced by: Charo Santos-Concio; Simon C. Ongpin
- Starring: Hilda Koronel; Richard Gomez; Armida Siguion-Reyna; Jay Ilagan; Kristine Garcia
- Cinematography: Ricardo Jacinto
- Edited by: Augusto Salvador
- Music by: Nonong Buencamino
- Production company: Vision Films
- Distributed by: Vision Films (Note: The film's ownership rights are currently owned and handled by ABS-CBN Corporation through Star Cinema.)
- Release date: 8 March 1990
- Running time: 107 minutes
- Country: Philippines
- Language: Filipino

Nagsimula sa Puso (English: It Started with the Heart) is a 1990 Philippine melodrama film directed by Mel Chionglo from a story and screenplay written by Ricky Lee, based on a DZRH radio drama of the same name written by Salvador M. Royales. Starring Hilda Koronel, Richard Gomez, Jay Ilagan, Armida Siguion-Reyna, Kristine Garcia, and Cherie Gil, the film follows Celina and Carlo, whose illicit relationship ended when Celina falsely claimed she was kidnapped and raped, sending Carlo to prison. Five years after his release, Carlo—still hasn't moved on—begins stalking Celina and her family. The film's theme song, composed by Nonong Buencamino and lyrics by Jose Bartolome, was sung by Nonoy Zuñiga.

Produced and distributed by Vision Films, the film was theatrically released on 8 March 1990. In 2009, ABS-CBN adapted the film into a teleserye of the same title, with Maja Salvador and Coco Martin respectively playing Celina and Carlo. In 2015, the film was digitally restored and remastered by ABS-CBN Film Restoration, in cooperation with Central Digital Lab.

== Plot ==
In 1984, Celina Fernandez, a professor teaching at the university, was in a relationship with her student Carlo, despite their age gap. However, their relationship received hostile opposition from Celina's mother, who wanted them to break up. The following afternoon, Carlo takes Celina to a beach in Batangas, and they spend the night making love. Their intimate night was cut short when they were caught by the authorities, as well as Celina's mother, who forced her daughter to lie to the court. At the court, when the lawyer asked Celina what happened that night, she forcefully confessed that Carlo kidnapped and raped her. Carlo, however, felt betrayed by Celina's forced but false confession and was sent to prison.

Five years later, in the year 1989, Celina is currently married to a corporate manager, Jim Suarez, and a mother to their son Jimboy. One afternoon, Celina received a call from somebody, and so did Jim. Unknown to them, the caller was Carlo, who was released from prison and began working at a used car dealership where he met Julie. When Celina returns home, she notices that someone has broken into their house, and when she discovers a locket, she silently realises that Carlo is the culprit.

When Celina was seduced by Carlo, the latter surrendered to the authorities. At the trial, Celina was forced to lie by her mother, but much to her mother's disappointment, she told the jury that Carlo did nothing wrong. Because of her actions, Jim left for his mistress's house. However, Chari advised him to go back to his wife and forgive.

One night, Carlo intrudes on their house again. Upon Celina pleading with him, Carlo sadly moved on from her, and he was escorted outside the house by Julie.

The film ends with the three, including Jim, who survived a gunshot, at the seaside. Jim tells Celina that they have to leave for the United States to avoid Carlo. Celina agrees, but she believes that he will never bother them again.

== Cast ==
- Hilda Koronel as Celina Fernandez-Suarez
- Richard Gomez as Carlo
- Jay Ilagan as Jim Suarez: Celina's husband
- Armida Siguion-Reyna as Mrs. Fernandez: Celina's mother, who strongly opposes her daughter's relationship with Carlo
- Kristine Garcia as Julie: Carlo's workmate at the used car dealership, who has romantic feelings for him
- Cherie Gil as Chari: Jim's secretary
- Geneive Aragon as Jimboy Suarez: Celina and Jim's son
- Vangie Labalan as Mameng: one of the house servants
- Lawrence Pineda as Eugene: Carlo's workmate, who urges him to move on from Celina
- Ester Chavez as Carlo's mother
- Evelyn Loretto as Celina's secretary

== Reception ==
=== Critical reception ===
Chantal Ramos, writing for Sinegang.PH, gave a negative retrospective review, calling the film "a half-hearted bore" and stating that the film should be titled as "Nagsimula sa Libog" or "Started with Lust".

== Television adaptation ==
In 2009, ABS-CBN remade the film into a teleserye of the same name. It primarily stars Maja Salvador (in her first lead role in television drama), Coco Martin, Nikki Gil, and Jason Abalos, with the supporting cast including Jaclyn Jose, Gloria Diaz, and Boboy Garovillo.
