= Mamamayan Ayaw sa Droga =

- — Philippine partylist —
- Chairperson: Richard Gomez (2001)
- Secretary general: Constantino Navarro III (2001)
- Sector(s) represented: Multi-sector
- Founded: 1999; 27 years ago
- Delisted: 2001
- Colors: Yellow, red

Mamamayan Ayaw sa Droga (MAD; lit. 'Citizens who don't like drug') is a non-governmental organization and anti-drug abuse advocacy group. They sought representation in the House of Representatives as a party-list group and garnered enough votes in the 2001 election but was disqualified for not representing a marginalized sector.

== History ==
=== Establishment and activities during the Estrada administration ===
The Mamamayan Ayaw sa Droga (MAD) started as a public awareness campaign against illegal drugs during the administration of President Joseph Estrada in mid-1999. Its lead figure, Richard Gomez was appointed as the presidential adviser on youth and sports to Estrada. Estrada's son, JV Ejercito is another noted member of MAD. The movement was institutionalized with the establishment of a foundation under the same name with the Securities and Exchange Commission. The foundation became the socio-political arm of the movement according to its leaders.

MAD collaborated with the government's National Drug Law Enforcement and Prevention Coordinating Center (DEP Center) in regards to drug enforcement and prevention efforts.

=== 2001 elections ===
Under the interim presidency of Gloria Macapagal Arroyo after the deposing of Estrada in January 2001 during the Second EDSA Revolution, MAD ran as a party-list group in the May 2001 election. According to the organization, the idea for MAD to enter the lower house of the legislature was first proposed sometime in 2000.

The MAD's partylist was challenged as early as March 2001. It is alleged to have funded by the government and that it does not represent a marginalized sector. MAD denied being funded by the government and that its past relationship with the DEP Center is legally permissible.

MAD garnered 1.5 million votes placing second to Bayan Muna in the elections which would have guaranteed its top three nominees including Gomez seats in the House of Representatives. However the Commission on Elections (COMELEC) disqualified MAD for not representing a marginalized group as intended by the party-list sector. The Supreme Court ruled with finality that MAD is not entitled to a seat in the Congress in April 2002.

== Activities and platforms ==
The MAD has focused its advocacy against illegal drugs and substance abuse. It lobbied for the reform of Dangerous Drugs Act of 1972 to lower the threshold of penalizable amount of possession of cannabis and methamphetamine. It also advocated for the increased awareness regarding drug abuse to parents and the youth.

MAD claimed to have helped set up 18 drug rehabilitation centers in the Philippines by 2001.

== Electoral results ==
Election	Votes	%	Secured Seats	Congress	Representative
2001	~1.5 million	—	0 / 3 (originally 3; nullified by COMELEC)	12th Congress; 2001–2004	Registration voided ab initio
Note: A party-list group, can win a maximum of three seats in the House of Representatives.
