= École Massillon =

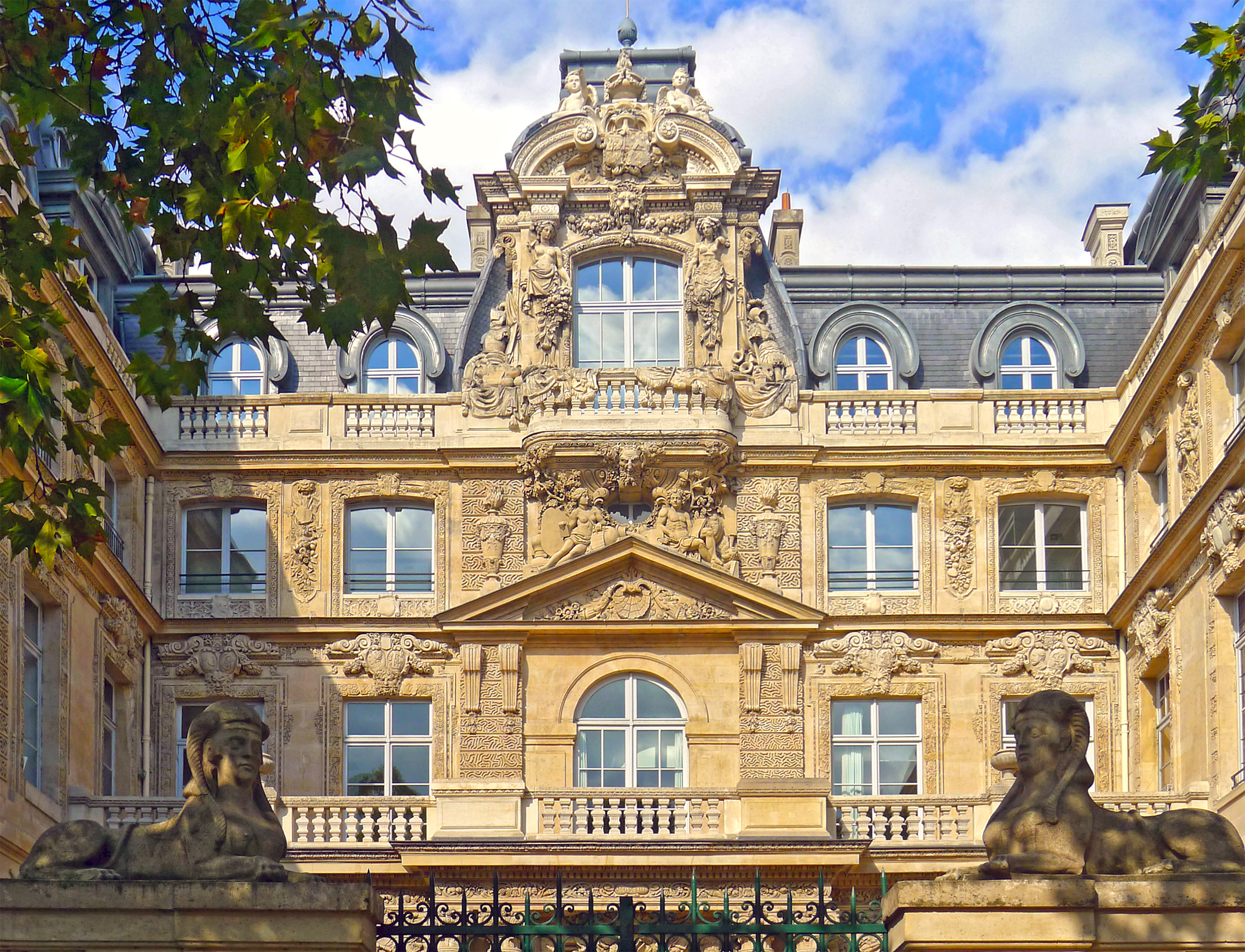

Location
- 2 bis quai des Célestins, Paris; France
- Coordinates: 48.85184°N 2.362263°E

Information
- Type: Private school under contract of association with the State
- Motto: "L’école n’est pas seulement un lieu de transmission du savoir, elle est aussi un lieu de communication des consciences". ("The school is not only a place of transmission of knowledge, it is also a place of communication of consciousness")
- Established: 10 October 1877
- Principal: L. Genou (2005-2012); T. Michon (2012-)
- Website: www.ecolemassillon.com

The école Massillon is a private educational establishment under contract with the state with 1380 students (in 2015). The establishment is under the control of the Oratory of Saint Philip Neri. It is located in the hôtel Fieubet and the Gratry Building, in the 4th arrondissement of Paris.

The establishment bears the name of Jean-Baptiste Massillon (1663-1742), a celebrated orator who gave the funeral oration for Louis XIV. There is also a rue Massillon in the same arrondissement, located on the île de la Cité.

== The school ==
The teaching covers classes from kindergarten to High School.

The establishment is twinned with the Federal Ministry of Education and Research (Germany); it is also a Cambridge exam centre.

The UAI code for the establishment is 0 752 920 S for the college.

== International dimension ==
The school has a native German and a native English section. Non-native students can also follow advanced German and English language classes. The school also prepares students for language exams such as the Cambridge English Advanced (CAE) and the Deutsches Sprachdiplom 1 and 2 (DSD).

== Ranking of the lycée ==
In 2022, the lycée was ranked 17th on the national level. and 11th on the departemental level. Students obtained a 100% admission rate at the baccalauréat with 99% obtaining a mention.

== History ==
The hôtel Fieubet was built by Jules Hardouin-Mansart, between 1676 and 1681, for Gaspard Fieubet, Chancellor of Queen Marie-Thérèse, as part of the former Royal Hotel of Saint-Pol. The hotel was then frequented by Jean de La Fontaine and Madame de Sévigné. The hotel was decorated by Le Sueur and Vicotte.

From 1814 to 1857, the hotel was a sugar refinery.

In 1857, Count Pierre de Lavalette bought the hotel and with architect Jules Gros transformed it into a Baroque Italo-Spanish pastiche, doubling the size of the right wing with sculpted decoration.

At the end of 1872, rue de Turenne, some priests from the Oratory began to educate youth. However, it was only from 10 October 1877 that the école Massillon began. On 3 April 1877, abbé Nouvelle bought the hôtel Fieubet. On 10 October of the same year, the building took its first 150 students.

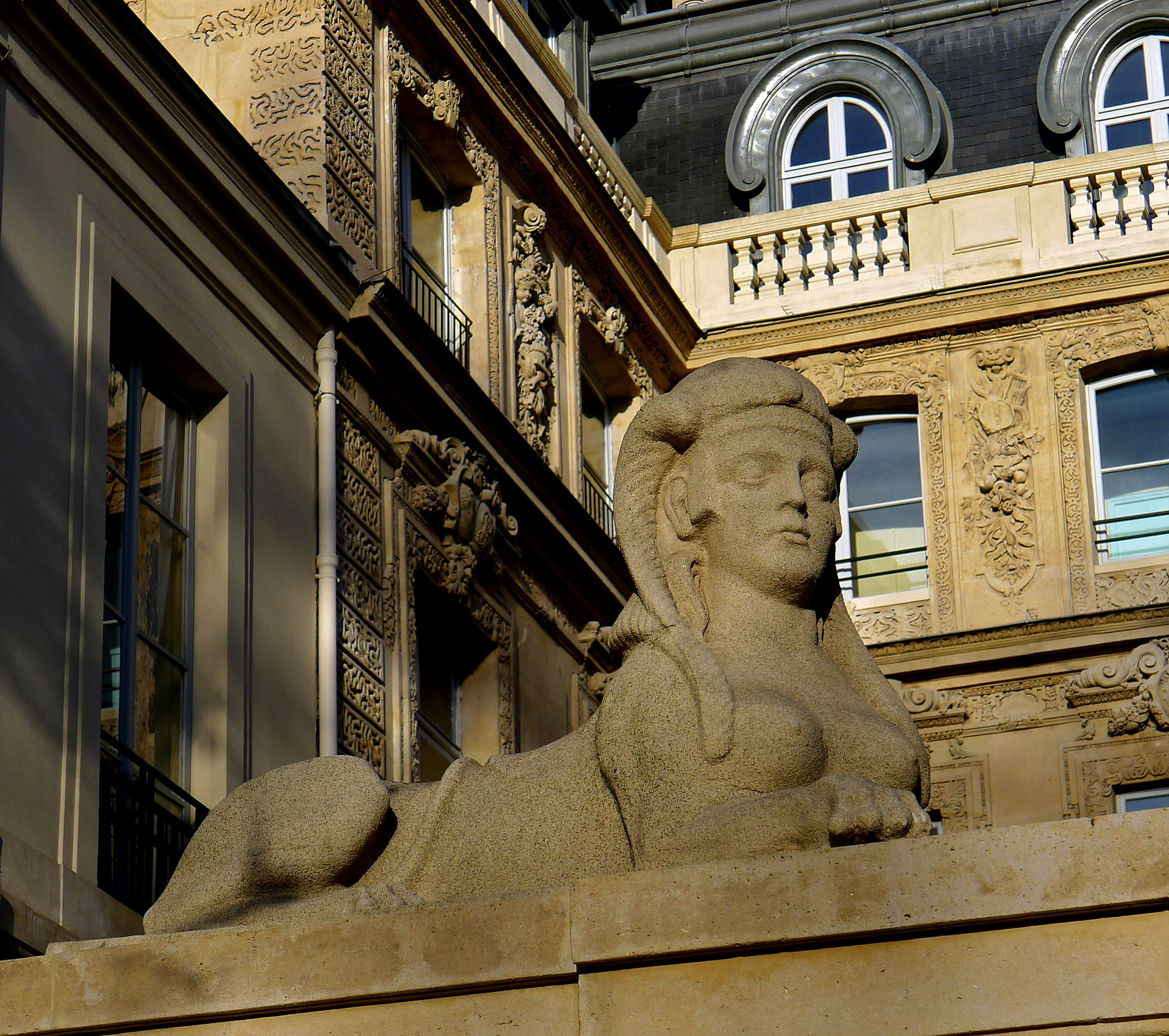
One of the sphinxes above the door

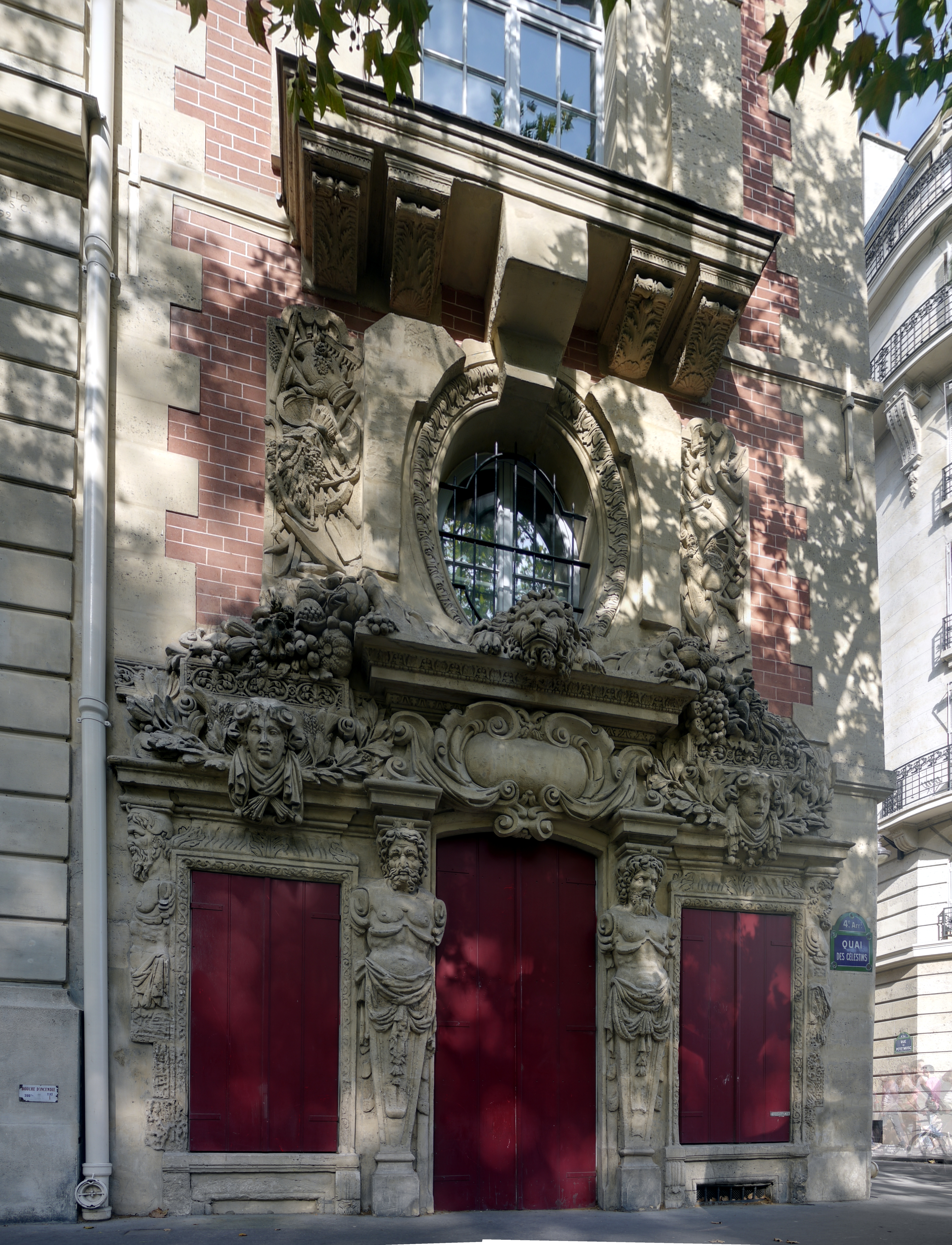
Right wing of the building — Neo-baroque Italo-Spanish motifs facing rue du Petit-Musc which is located directly to the left.

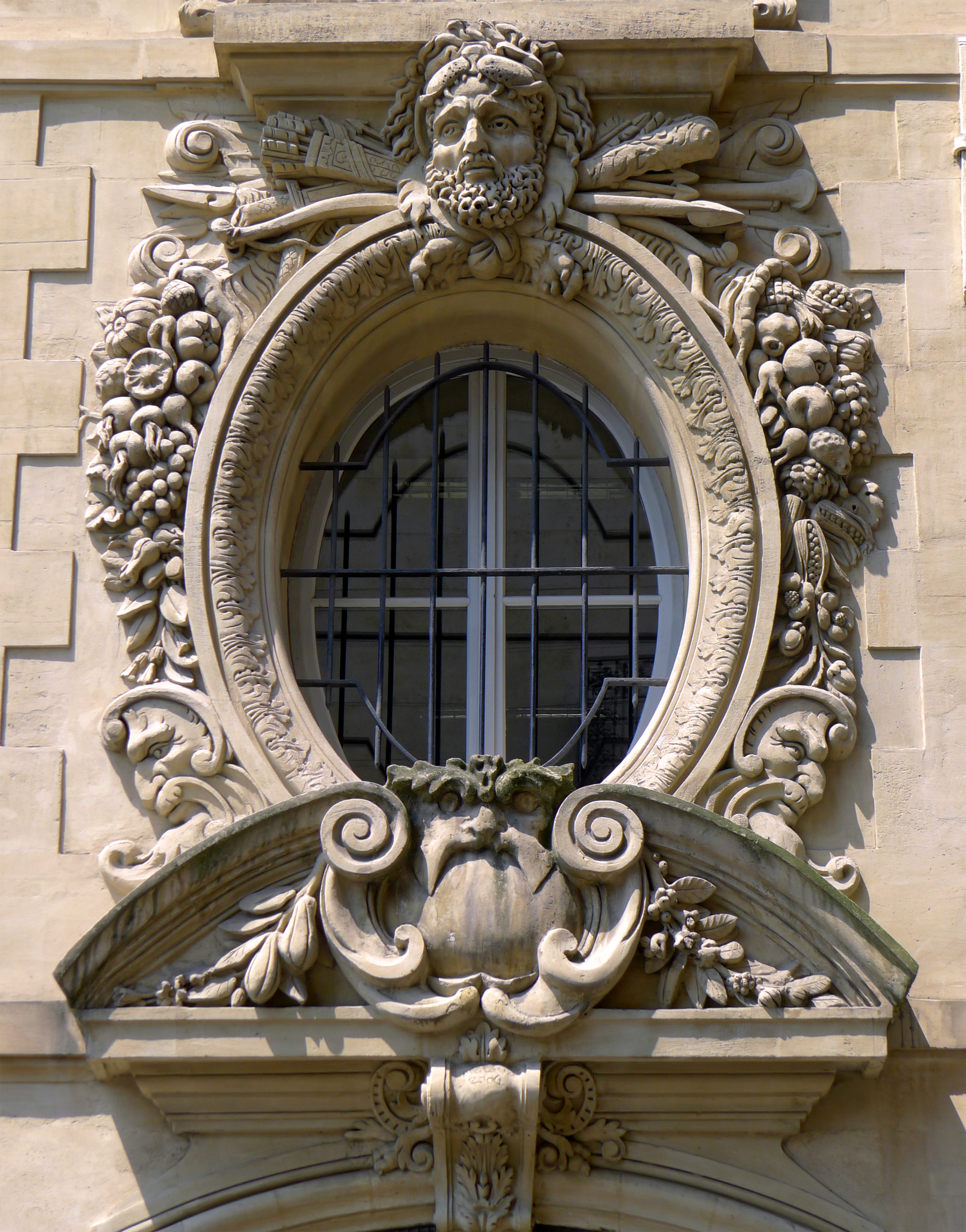
Decoration on rue du Petit-Musc.

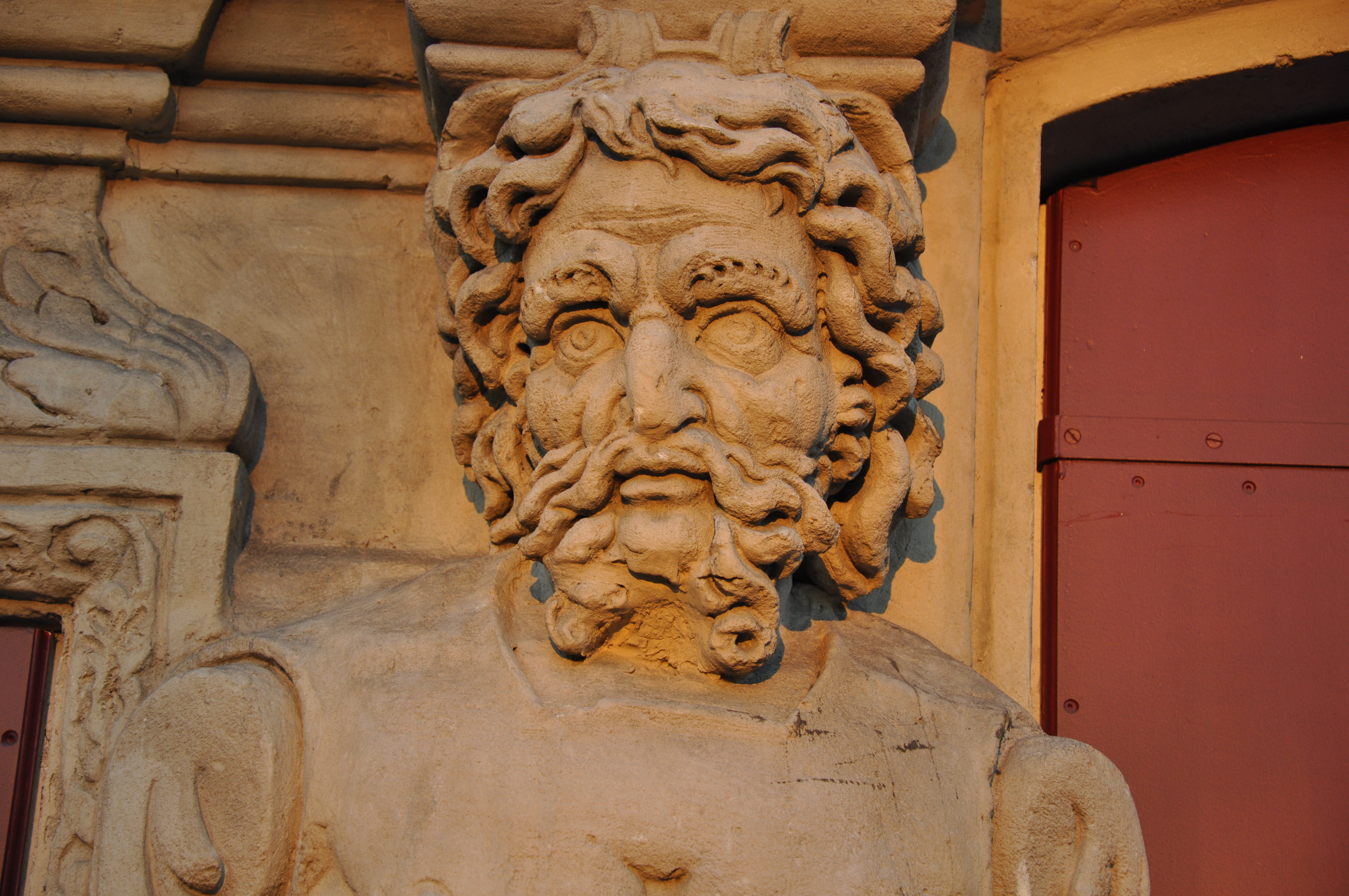
Detail on the east façade.

== Associations ==
The école Massillon is rich in cultural and international diversity, and works with numerous associations, including many humanitarian organisations (A.C.K.S.P., Solar Burkina Project...), a student investment club, multilingual debating societies, and educational associations such as a theatre club run by Xavier Maly as well as a chess club which in 2011 won a student tournament and a scout group.

== Students ==
2021: Primary school; 313 students. College; 592 students. Lycée; 460 students.

== Former students ==
- Michel Anthonioz (1947-2009)
- Charles Consigny
- Alain de Greef
- Cécile de Ménibus
- Pierre Messmer
- French painter Michel-Marie Poulain (1906-1991)
- Academic writer Frédéric Vitoux (1944-)

== Disambiguation ==
There is also another school named Massillon in Clermont-Ferrand, which also has classes from kindergarten to high school and also prepares for general baccalaureate.

== Annex ==
Other schools run by the Oratorians :

- Collège de Juilly (Juilly, Seine-et-Marne)
- Collège de Vendôme (Vendôme)
- École Massillon (Paris)
- École Saint-Érembert (Saint-Germain-en-Laye)
- École Saint-Martin-de-France (Pontoise)
- École Saint-François (Évreux)
- École Saint-Philippe Neri (Juan-les-Pins)
- Collège des Oratoriens de Joyeuse (Ardèche).

=== See also ===
- Hôtel Fieubet

=== Alumni site ===
- Official site
- Alumni
