= Bea Nicolas =

Filipino actress

- Born: Beatrice Faye Cancio Nicolas; April 15, 1994 (age 31); Manila, Philippines
- Occupation: Actress
- Years active: 1998–2012
- Agent: Star Magic(1998–2012)
- Spouse: Robby Inso (m. 2020)

Beatrice Faye Cancio Nicolas (born April 15, 1994) is a Filipino former child actress in film and television. Her older sister is former child actress Iwi Nicolas. Bea Nicolas is a licensed Medical technologist.

== Filmography ==
=== Television ===
Year	Title	Role	Notes	Source
1998-01	Penpen de Sarapen	Herself		
2002-06	Sineskwela	Tala		
2005–06	Ang Panday	Henia		
2007	Rounin			
2009	Nagsimula sa Puso	Ana		
2011	Wansapanataym		Episode: "Flores de Mayumi"	
2010	Maalaala Mo Kaya	Carla's classmate	Episode: "Bracelet"	
2011	Maalaala Mo Kaya	Jasmine	Episode: Sapatos	
2012	Maalaala Mo Kaya		Episode: "Gayuma"	

=== Film ===
Year	Title	Role	Notes	Source
2000	Laro Sa Baga	Young Dee	Nominated – Best Child Actress – 21st PMPC Star Awards for Movies	
2001	Mila	Belay		
2004	Sabel	Young Sabel		
