= Kid, Huwag Kang Susuko =

1987 Filipino film

- Official movie poster
- Directed by: Peque Gallaga; Lore Reyes
- Screenplay by: Alfred Yuson
- Story by: K. Sy Hoda
- Produced by: Lily Monteverde
- Starring: Richard Gomez
- Cinematography: Eduardo Jacinto
- Edited by: Jesus Navarro
- Music by: Nonong Buencamino
- Production company: Regal Films
- Distributed by: Regal Films
- Release date: July 2, 1987
- Running time: 125 minutes
- Country: Philippines
- Languages: Filipino; English

Kid, Huwag Kang Susuko (transl. Kid, Don't Give Up) is a 1987 Philippine martial arts drama film directed by Peque Gallaga and Lore Reyes. The film stars Richard Gomez as the title role. The film is a Philippine rendition of the 1984 movie The Karate Kid.

The film is streaming online on YouTube.

== Synopsis ==
Breaking away from his private and quiet life, Cesar "Sawie", a renowned karate master is teaching martial arts to poor children. His life of solitude has been disrupted when his rival enemy, Wyrlo forces him back to spotlight and challenges him for a one on one battle.

== Cast ==
- Richard Gomez as Cesar "Sawie" Arroyo
- Nida Blanca as Aling Turing
- Mark Gil as Wyrlo
- Rachel Ann Wolfe as Ogie
- Mel Martinez as Pongkee
- Peewee Quijano as Shado
- Jang Hwan Kim as Mr. Tan
- Romy Romulo as Coach Alegre
- Sammy Brillante as Durano
- Bernard Cañaberal as Genevie
- E.R. Ejercito as Mano
- Bobby Reyes as Hapon
- Crispin Medina as Tournament Referee

== Awards ==
Year	Awards	Category	Recipient	Result	Ref.
1988	35th FAMAS Awards	Best Supporting Actor	Mark Gil	Nominated	
1988	35th FAMAS Awards	Best Supporting Actress	Nida Blanca	Won	
1988	35th FAMAS Awards	Best Child Actor	Mel Martinez	Won	
1988	35th FAMAS Awards	Best Screenplay	Alfred Yuson	Won	
1988	6th FAP Awards	Best Supporting Actress	Nida Blanca	Won	
