= Rosa (cow) =

Cow participating in a TV game show

- Species: Cattle (Bos primigenius taurus)
- Breed: Landes
- Sex: Female
- Born: 26 May 2001; Badajoz, Extremadura, Spain
- Died: 14 July 2020 (aged 19); Buglose, France
- Years active: 2004–2014
- Known for: Intervilles
- Owner: Labat family
- Offspring: 1

Rosa (26 May 2001 – 14 July 2020) was a Spanish-born Landes cow known for her participation in the French game show Intervilles. She became a popular part of the programme due to her intelligence and aggressiveness. She died in 2020 of a gastric illness.

== Early life ==
Rosa was born in Badajoz, Extremadura, Spain. She was born with a black face and white body, a distinctive colouring compared to the black cows around her. When Rosa was one year old, she was spotted by Jean-Pierre Labat, who was on a visit for breeding cattle. She joined the breeding herd in France owned by the Labat family, who had previously provided cows for use in Intervilles. Rosa was given a trial in Germany for Intervilles. Though she initially appeared shy and Jean-Pierre Labat believed there were better cows, the programme's producer, Yves Launoy, selected Rosa for the televised programme due to her unique colours.

== Intervilles ==
Rosa made her debut on Intervilles in 2004, and she was recognised for both her aggression towards contestants and her intelligence in knocking down sets to prevent contestants from scoring. Despite her aggressiveness, she would not attack contestants when they were on the ground. During a game that involved pushing contestants into a pool, Rosa approached people slowly without aggression, running her horns against the legs of contestants to see if they would dive or not. Due to her popularity, she was given her own game called "Rosa Strike" based on bowling. She missed one season of Intervilles when she gave birth to a calf. Due to her popularity, she was featured in the Intervilles video game for the Wii. Fans of the Intervilles programme visited the Labat farm to see Rosa.

== Farm life and death ==
Following her retirement from televised competition, Rosa adopted a role as head of the herd at the Labat family farm, often leading the other cows. She toured France taking part in similar style games to Intervilles until 2020 when she was retired to pasture. Later in 2020, she started losing weight, and she died of a gastric illness on 14 July 2020.
