= Penpen de Sarapen =

- Also known as: PPDS
- Genre: Educational; Variety Show
- Presented by: Connie Angeles
- Country of origin: Philippines
- Original language: Filipino

Production
- Production locations: Live Studio 2 RPN Studio, Broadcast City, Quezon City
- Running time: 1 hour

Original release
- Network: RPN/New Vision 9
- Release: 1987 – 2001

Penpen de Sarapen is a Philippine television show for children broadcast by Radio Philippines Network. Hosted by Connie Angeles, Camille Angeles, Fred Moore delos Santos and Teena Cruz, it aired from 1987 to 2001. The stage of Penpen de Sarapen was set in the atrium of Farmers Plaza in Araneta Center (now Araneta City), Cubao, Quezon City and then eventually moved to the RPN's local studio in Broadcast City, Quezon City. The show was an entertainment, game and story-telling show for children.

== Hosts ==
- Connie Angeles
- Camille Angeles
- Teena Cruz
- Fred Moore delos Santos

== Artists ==
- Chris Guerrero as Islaw Kalabaw
- Assunta de Rossi
- Alessandra de Rossi
- Sunshine Dizon
- Sarah Geronimo
- Bea Nicolas
- Joy Isabel a.k.a. 'Ate Candy - Malalasahan Mo Kaya and Balitang C, Columbia Candy Segment'
- Cherie Gel Maglasang
- Pao Herrera
- Allan Quiocho - Kim Jeong Un
- Harry William Acosta a.k.a. Harry del Castillo
- Cindy Tiodianco
- Caselyn Francisco
- Camile Velasco
- Jennylyn Mercado
- Joyce Torresyap
- Kaye Baron
- Jaychris Osias
- Arwin "Antukin" Camasuela
- Erick "May Dating" Jade Azarcon
- Evan Dwight Salandanan
- Grechell Ann Silvestre
- Aia Camille Gutierrez Razon a.k.a. Regent Girl Dancer
- John Fontanilla

== See also ==
- List of programs previously broadcast by Radio Philippines Network
