= Wombat (TV series) =

- Genre: Children's television series
- Country of origin: Australia
- Original language: English
- No. of seasons: 12

Production
- Production locations: Brisbane, Queensland

Original release
- Network: Seven Network
- Release: 1979 – 1990

Related
- Boris' Breakfast Club; Agro's Cartoon Connection

Wombat is an Australian children's television show which screened on the Seven Network from 1979 to 1990. It was produced at BTQ7 in Brisbane and aired across Australia on weekday afternoons, and later Saturday and Sunday mornings.

== Synopsis ==
The show had a number of hosts or presenters who were accompanied by their co-host Agro, a puppet portrayed/voiced by comedian Jamie Dunn, who had previously become known on the program Boris' Breakfast Club.

The program consisted of small educational editorials presented in a variety of segments. The segments featured a number of regular reporters including Eric Summons, Cecelia Martine, Craig Campbell, Fiona MacDonald, Fran Morrison, Bob La Castra, identical twins Gayle & Gillian Blakeney, Rob Elliott, Tony Gordon, Jill Ray, Sam Harvey, and Gary Hardgrave.

The program also included children as regular reporters including Scott Sutherland and Pippa. Some of these reporters performed double duty as host of the show, notably Bob La Castra and Gayle & Gillian Blakeney. Other regular guests included: Laurel Edwards, Michael Futcher, Stacey Thomson ("Ranger Stacey"), Ashley Wilkie, Kristine Davis, Nicky Gibson, and Glenn Hansen.

== Presenters ==
Agro Portrayed by Jamie Dunn
Eric Summons
Cecilia Martine
Fiona MacDonald
Bob La Castra
Gayle and Gillian Blakeney
Rob Elliot

== Awards ==
The show received four consecutive Logie Awards for Most Popular Children's Program from 1987 to 1990. It also won a United Nations Media Peace Award for the 1988 Bicentennial Special. In addition, Agro won a Penguin Award from the Television Society of Australia.

Some of the cast went on to appear in the similar themed Totally Wild. Agro went on to host Agro's Cartoon Connection and The Super Sunday Show.

== See also ==
- List of Australian television series
