= The Biggest Game Show in the World Asia =

- Genre: Reality competition
- Written by: Joseph Bolintiam
- Directed by: Monti P. Parungao
- Presented by: Joey De Leon; Richard Gomez; Mr. Fu
- Opening theme: "Ipakita Mo" by Voyz Avenue
- Country of origin: Malaysia
- Original language: English
- No. of seasons: 1
- No. of episodes: 14 (final)

Production
- Executive producer: Rose C. Camia
- Editor: Reichelle Reyes
- Running time: 60 minutes
- Production company: Mistral Productions/ IceTV

Original release
- Network: TV5 (Philippines); RCTI (Indonesia); VTC9 - Let's Viet VTV3 (Vietnam); Kantana Channel 5 Thailand (Thailand)
- Release: February 12 – May 13, 2012

Related
- The Biggest Game Show in the World

The Biggest Game Show in the World Asia is a Philippine television reality competition show broadcast by TV5. The show based on the French TV game show The Biggest Game Show in the World. Hosted by Joey De Leon, Richard Gomez, Mr. Fu, it aired from February 12 to May 13, 2012, replacing Wow Mali and was replaced by Super Sine Prime.

== Presenters ==
=== Indonesia ===
- Arie Untung
- Raffi Ahmad

=== Philippines ===
- Richard Gomez
- Joey de Leon

=== Thailand ===
- Phoomjai Tangsanga

=== Music ===
- Alain Weiller

== See also ==
- List of TV5 (Philippine TV network) original programming
