= Jean-Marc Morandini =

French television host

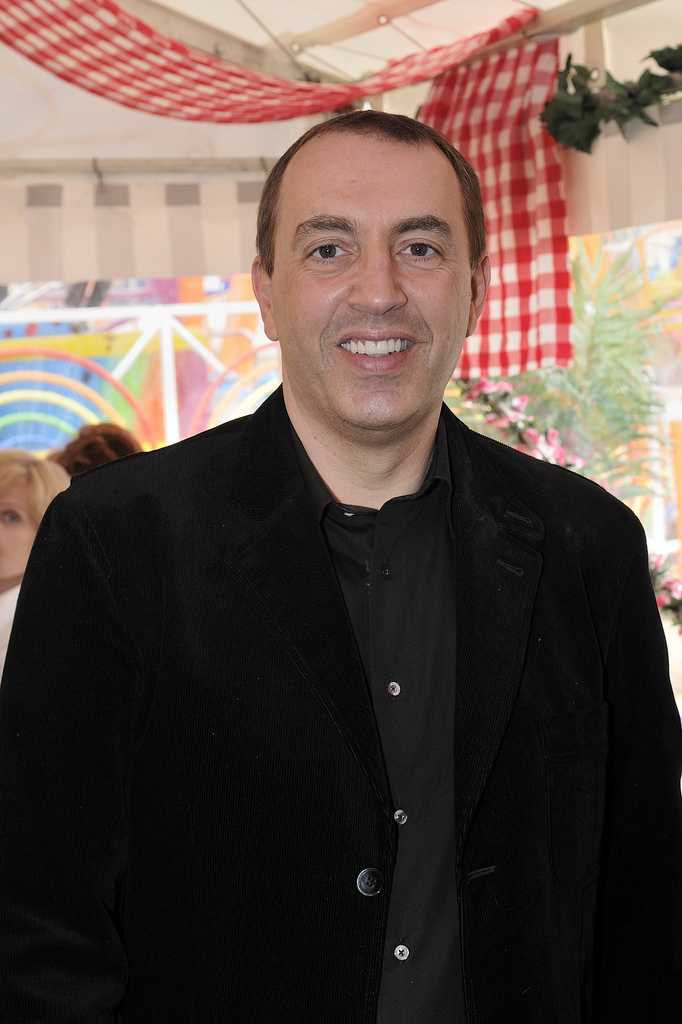
French journalist Jean-Marc Morandini in April 2009.

Jean-Marc Morandini (French pronunciation: [ʒɑ̃ maʁk mɔʁɑ̃dini]; born 5 August 1965) is a French television host and convicted pedophile.

Morandini was born in Marseille. In 1985, aged 20, he became the youngest TV announcer in France. He worked for channel La Cinq, before creating and animating the programme Tout est possible on TF1 for 4 years (1993–1997). The programme was sharply criticised for its lack of intelligence, particularly by Libération and Les Guignols de l'Info, and was eventually discontinued.

Morandini then turned to radio, working for RMC Info and, since 2003, for Europe 1 and also for Radio Expérience Plus.

On 12 April 2007, Morandini started a small scandal from his blog, where he stated his intentions to publish estimations of results of the presidential election as soon as 18h; according to the French applicable laws (loi électorale du 19 février 2002), the results cannot be announced before 20h00. For years, media from neighbouring Belgium and Switzerland have broadcast programmes in French where estimations of the results are given before the official hour.

In September 2016, Morandini was placed under formal investigation for "corruption of minors" in relation to the casting process for a 2016 web series, Les Faucons. He has been convicted for "corruption of minors", having sent sexually explicit messages to three minors between 2009 and 2016 and the conviction upheld on 14 January 2026.

== Publications ==
- Le Bal des faux-culs. l'Archipel. 2004. ISBN 978-2-841-87572-6.
- L'Enfer du décor. l'Archipel. 2005. ISBN 978-2-841-87678-5.
- Télé-Vérité. l'Archipel. 2006. ISBN 978-2-841-87678-5.
