= Cécile de Ménibus =

French television presenter (born 1970)

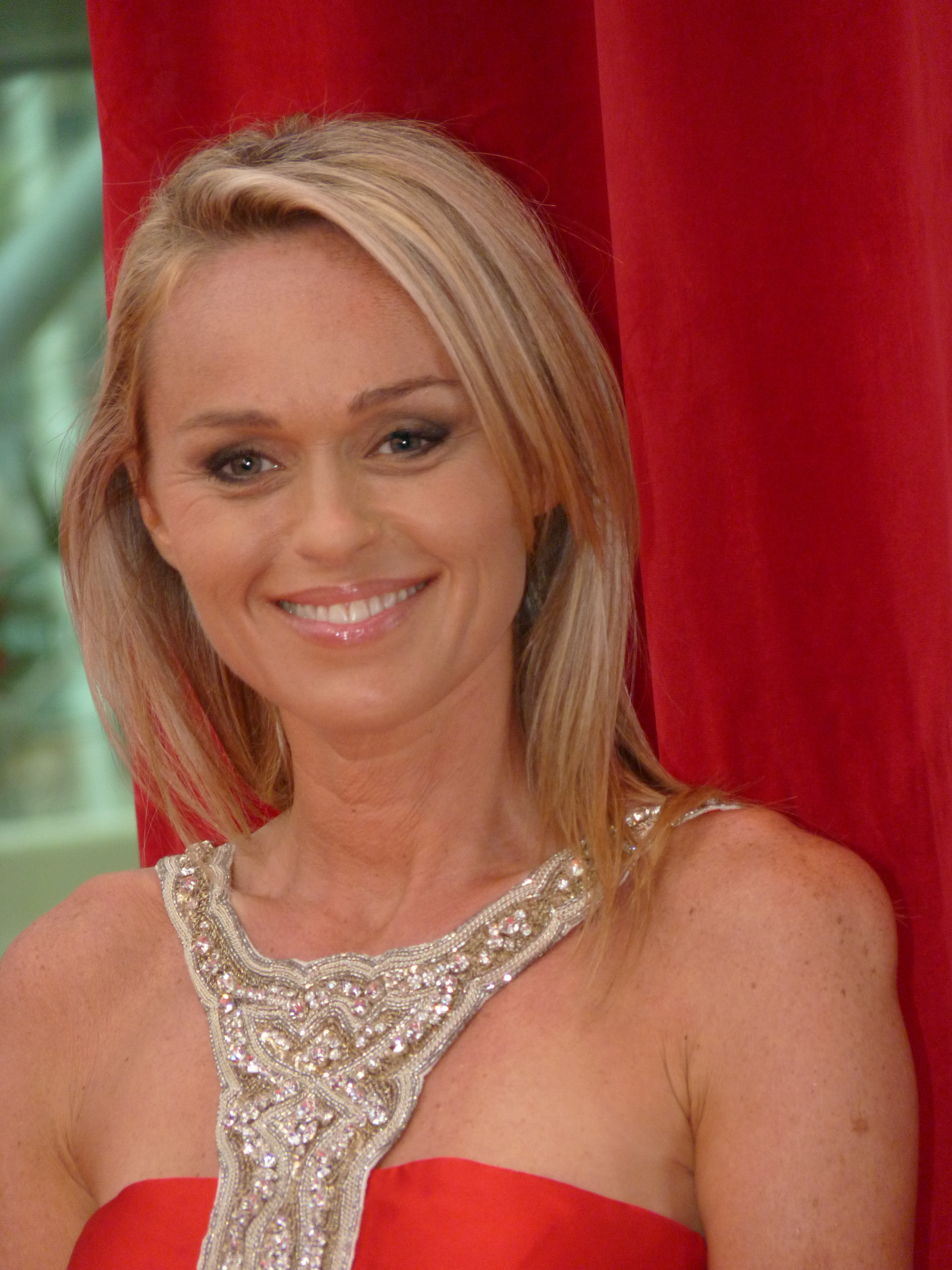
- de Ménibus at the 52nd Monte-Carlo Television Festival
- Born: Cécile Marie Anne Moharic; 16 September 1970 (age 55); Rambouillet, Yvelines, France
- Occupation: Television presenter
- Years active: 1987–present
- Spouse: Yann Delaigue (2007–11) (divorced)

Cécile Marie Anne Moharic better known as Cécile de Ménibus (born 16 September 1970), is a French television presenter.

== Biography and career ==
Cécile de Ménibus left high school in 1987 and started working as a switchboardist in a modeling production agency and then became a press secretary and stringer for sport magazines such as Auto Plus. She then got interested in automotive sports and became a photographer for the Formula One races, where she met Ayrton Senna.

She then started a career on Belgian radio hosting from 1990 to 1994 the traffic and the weather on Europe 2 in Brussels. She also played in a few sitcoms such as Cas de divorce in 1991, and created a radio for women titled Fréquence Elle. She continued a career in automotive racing and in 1996, hosted the Belgian Championship of tourism cars while driving a Peugeot 106.

In 1997, she worked in the public relations at the Département Promotion & Partenariats of the Lagardère Group for Europe 2 and RFM in 2000. Since 2001, she co-hosts with Sébastien Cauet a morning program on Europe 2, and then the television program La Méthode Cauet on TF1 from 2003 to 2008.

Between September 2009 to July 2012, she is part of the team of the program Morandini ! hosted by Jean-Marc Morandini from Monday to Friday on Direct 8. In 2010, she presents her own program on the same channel titled 100% immersion, in which there are all kinds of enquiries like a document on the RAID.

In 2010, she became the assistant producer of Sébastien Cauet for his program Ça va s'Cauet. During Summer 2012, she co-hosts every morning RTL the radio program Stéphane Plaza vous Z with Stéphane Plaza.

She made a replacement on Belgian radio Bel RTL in 2013, and hosted in September of that year the radio program 2 h de Ménibus retitled Le Ménibus des stars. The program ended four months later due to logistic problems.

== Personal life ==
Cécile de Ménibus married the rugby player Yann Delaigue on 29 June 2007. The couple divorced in 2011.

== Television programs ==
- La Méthode Cauet on TF1 (2003–08), co-host
- CaueTivi on Fun Radio and TF6 (2003–08), co-host
- On nous dit on TF1 (2008), presenter and editor
- Blockbuster on Syfy (2008), presenter
- Morandini ! on Direct 8 (2009–12), co-host with Jean-Marc Morandini
- L'incroyable casting on TF6 (2009–12), co-host
- 100% immersion on Direct 8 (2010–12), presenter
- Les Maîtres du rire on Direct 8 (2010–12), presenter
- Intervilles International on Gulli (2014), co-host
