= Fiona MacDonald (television presenter) =

Australian television presenter (1956/1957–2024)

- Born: Fiona Frances MacDonald; 27 May 1957; Blackall, Queensland, Australia
- Died: 3 October 2024 (aged 67); Sydney, New South Wales, Australia
- Occupation: Television presenter
- Family: Jacki MacDonald (sister)

Fiona Frances MacDonald (27 May 1957 – 3 October 2024) was an Australian television presenter. She was the star of the Australian children's series Wombat in 1983, and later the host of the game show, It's a Knockout.

== Life and career ==
MacDonald was raised on a cattle property in the outback town of Blackall, Queensland. She had two sisters, Kylie and Jacki MacDonald, the latter also a television presenter.

MacDonald appeared on local television in Queensland before going on to national programs such as children's show Wombat and the local version of British game show It's a Knockout. While hosting Wombat, she was featured in the "A Day in the Life" series by The Australian Women's Weekly. After leaving It's a Knockout, MacDonald became a wine expert. She also was writer and co-editor of the student newspaper Woroni in the 1990s.

== Personal life and death ==
She married in the 1990s and had two sons.

MacDonald was diagnosed with motor neurone disease in November 2021. She undertook a drive around Australia with her sister, Kylie Thynne, in mid-2023 to raise funds for research into the disease, and talked about her experience with it in an October 2023 episode of Australian Story. She died on 3 October 2024, at the age of 67. MacDonald wrote a post announcing her death that her sister Kylie uploaded on her behalf.
