= Brad McEwan =

Australian television presenter (born 1971)

- Born: 28 April 1971 (age 55); Victoria, Australia
- Occupations: Television presenter; Radio presenter; Sports journalist

Brad McEwan (born 28 April 1971) is an Australian television presenter and sports journalist.

McEwan has previously been a sport presenter on the Brisbane, Sydney and Melbourne editions of 10 News and is best known for his hosting duties on Network 10's Sports Tonight.

== Early life ==
McEwan grew up in Lockington, a small town close to Echuca in Northern Victoria. He is a former student of Rochester High School and then Ballarat College of Advanced Education just prior to it becoming a college of Melbourne University; as Ballarat University. (now independent as the Federation University Australia) where he studied Physical Education.

== Career ==
=== Radio ===
In 1994, Brad commenced a four-year period at Triple M in Melbourne where he worked in the newsroom as a sports reporter and presenter.

=== Television ===
McEwan's entry into television arrived in 1999 when he commenced work with Network 10 in Melbourne as a sports reporter. He reported and presented sport for Ten in Melbourne (where he was a substitute for Stephen Quartermain).

In 2004, Brad moved to Brisbane where he was a sport presenter, producer and writer with 10 News and he also filled in as a news presenter. McEwan replaced Bill McDonald who became news presenter on the bulletin. Additionally, McEwan hosted Queensland's local AFL show Queensland Rules, and commentated from the boundary for many of the AFL games held in Brisbane.

In late 2006, Network Ten welcomed the new format of 10 Late News with Sports Tonight, which saw Brad move to Sydney in 2007. McEwan replaced Ryan Phelan becoming the main presenter of Sports Tonight.

In 2008, Brad became the permanent replacement for Tim Webster as sport presenter on Sydney's 10 News.

In August 2008, McEwan injured his knee when attempting to take a mark over a marking bag while filming an AFL segment for the news resulting in his admission to hospital and surgery. He returned to work in 2009 after signing a 4-year contract extension with Network 10.

In September 2013, it was announced that he would return to Melbourne to present sport on 10 News, replacing Stephen Quartermain.

In 2014, McEwan hosted the overnight session on Network 10's coverage of the Sochi 2014 Winter Olympics

In February 2018, McEwan stepped down from sport presenting duties on 10 News Melbourne. His final bulletin was on 27 April 2018.
