= TransTel =

German television program distributor

Logo of TransTel, which was seen in most of the German television programs.

TransTel (sometimes referred to as TransTel Cologne) is a former television company set up in the German city of Cologne in 1963, whose primary activity was the distribution of West German/German programmes to television stations in Latin America, Africa and Asia, as well as programmes to learn the German language. Partially funded by the German government and jointly operated by German television stations ARD and ZDF, TransTel selected, edited, and dubbed into several languages material from these stations that was considered to be of cultural, educational, or public relations interest. Since 1998, its archives are with Deutsche Welle.

Founded in 1963, Transtel's first production being a translated version of a filmed newsreel. Deutsche Welle was one of its strategic partners, who selected programmes for export, acquisition of rights and translations to several languages.

TransTel also provided broadcasters with highlights of the 1970 FIFA World Cup, held in Mexico, in anticipation for the 1974 FIFA World Cup, held in West Germany. For the latter, it provided satellite links for four matches, including the final. In Singapore, Television Singapura (Channel 5) had to pay its royalties back to FIFA, as well as the agencies responsible for the recordings, including TransTel.

It co-operated with Oregon Public Broadcasting and the Goethe Institute to create The Pappenheimers, a German learning series, which also provided a cultural tour of the country.

In 1998, the federal government liquidated TransTel and, from 1 January 1999, its catalogue became a part of DW Sales & Distribution.

== See also ==
- Television in Germany
- Deutsche Welle
