= The Biggest Game Show in the World (Greek TV series) =

- Genre: Reality competition
- Written by: Joseph Bolintiam
- Presented by: Nadia Boule
- Composer: Alain Weiller
- Countries of origin: France; China
- Original language: Greek
- No. of seasons: 1
- No. of episodes: 13

Production
- Executive producer: Anna Arvaniti
- Editor: Thodoris Simantirakis
- Running time: 75 minutes

Original release
- Network: ANT1
- Release: October 25, 2013 – February 20, 2014

Related
- The Biggest Game Show in the World; Jeux sans frontières

The Biggest Game Show in the World (Greece) is a Greek reality game show based on the French-Chinese TV game shows, The Biggest Game Show in the World.

The show is supposed to be based on the game show Jeux sans frontières, which was considered the biggest televised game show in the world for over 30 years.

== 1st Episode ==
Teams	Final Points
China	9
France	13
Russia	16
Greece	24
Kazakhstan	27
Spain	22

Wall of champions The wall of champions is the sixth and final game that brings out the final winner of each episode. the assay of the game split into two groups: the first group involved teams that received with the lowest score, assert the 4th, 5th, and 6th place, while the second group involved teams that received with the highest score and assert 1st, 2nd and 3rd place. the final points of groups corresponds to height on the wall of champions (e.g. if Russia have a final score 18 points, then the pole will be placed at 18 and from there will start the player)

Teams	Groups	Final Ranking
China	A	5th
France	A	6th
Russia	A	4th
Greece	B	2nd
Kazakhstan	B	1st
Spain	B	3rd

== 2nd Episode ==
Teams	Final Points
China	10
France	17
Russia	20
Greece	21
Kazakhstan	21
Spain	23

Wall of champions

Teams	Groups	Final Ranking
China	A	5th
France	A	6th
Russia	A	4th
Greece	B	2nd
Kazakhstan	B	1st
Spain	B	3rd^

^Spain lost the second place, because the last player had put the pole in the indication one instead of zero and finally took third place.

== 3rd Episode ==
Teams	Final Points
China	19
France	16
Russia	20
Greece	17
Kazakhstan	27
Spain	23

Wall of champions

Teams	Groups	Final Ranking
China	A	4th
France	A	6th
Russia	B	1st
Greece	A	5th
Kazakhstan	B	3rd
Spain	B	2nd

== 4th Episode ==
Teams	Final Points
China	14
France	21
Russia	20
Greece	22
Kazakhstan	22
Spain	20

Wall of champions

Teams	Groups	Final Ranking
China	A	5th
France	B	3rd
Russia	A	4th
Greece	B	2nd
Kazakhstan	B	1st
Spain	A	6th

== 5th Episode ==
Teams	Final Points
China	12
France	18
Russia	22
Greece	18
Kazakhstan	23
Spain	26

Wall of champions

Teams	Groups	Final Ranking
China	A	5th
France	A	6th
Russia	B	3rd^
Greece	A	4th
Kazakhstan	B	1st
Spain	B	2nd

^Russia lost the first place, because the last player had put the pole in the indication one instead of zero and finally took third place.

== 6th Episode ==
Teams	Final Points
China	14
France	11
Russia	19
Greece	23
Kazakhstan	22
Spain	23

Wall of champions

Teams	Groups	Final Ranking
China	A	5th
France	A	6th
Russia	A	4th
Greece	B	2nd
Kazakhstan	B	1st
Spain	B	3rd

== 7th Episode ==
Teams	Final Points
China	12
France	11
Russia	25
Greece	20
Kazakhstan	26
Spain	25

Wall of champions

Teams	Groups	Final Ranking
China	A	5th
France	A	6th
Russia	B	1st
Greece	A	4th
Kazakhstan	B	2nd
Spain	B	3rd

== 8th Episode ==
Teams	Final Points
China	16
Russia	23
Greece	20
Kazakhstan	22
Spain	22

Wall of champions

Teams	Groups	Final Ranking
China	A	5th
Russia	B	3rd
Greece	A	4th
Kazakhstan	B	1st
Spain	B	2nd

== 9th Episode ==
Teams	Final Points
China	13
France	19
Russia	13
Greece	15
Kazakhstan	27
Spain	24

Wall of champions

Teams	Groups	Final Ranking
China	A	6th
France	B	3rd
Russia	A	4th
Greece	A	5th
Kazakhstan	B	1st
Spain	B	2nd

== 10th Episode ==
Teams	Final Points
China	5
France	22
Russia	22
Greece	21
Kazakhstan	16
Spain	27

Wall of champions

Teams	Groups	Final Ranking
China	A	6th
France	B	3rd
Russia	B	1st
Greece	A	4th
Kazakhstan	A	5th
Spain	B	2nd

== 11th Episode (Semi-Final 1) ==
Teams	Final Points
China	11
France	16
Russia	21
Greece	17
Kazakhstan	25
Spain	24

Wall of champions

Teams	Groups	Final Ranking
China	A	6th
France	A	5th
Russia	B	2nd
Greece	A	4th
Kazakhstan	B	1st
Spain	B	3rd

== 12th Episode (Semi-Final 2) ==
Teams	Final Points
China	16
France	17
Russia	15
Greece	25
Kazakhstan	19
Spain	22

Wall of champions

Teams	Groups	Final Ranking
China	A	5th
France	A	6th
Russia	A	4th
Greece	B	1st
Kazakhstan	B	2nd
Spain	B	3rd

== 13th Episode (Final) ==
Teams	Final Points
China	11
France	20
Russia	31
Greece	25
Kazakhstan	35
Spain	37

Wall of champions

Before you start the game was a draw that will compete in the wall countries. Russia, Spain and France first started and immediately after Kazakhstan, Greece and China started second. The aim was to make the fastest time on the wall. (e.g. if Greece did 1 minute 5 seconds then all countries are champions of the game)(The country reach the finish line with the lowest time is the winner)

Teams	Final Ranking
China	5th place
France	6th place
Russia	2nd place
Greece	3rd place
Kazakhstan	Champion
Spain	4th place
