= Richard Gomez =

Filipino actor and politician (born 1966)

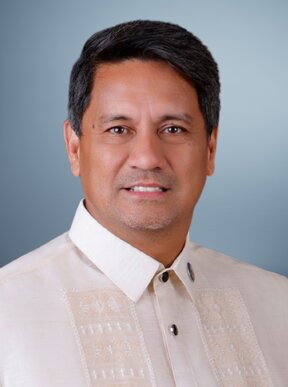
- Official portrait, 2025

Member of the Philippine House of Representatives from Leyte's 4th congressional district
- Incumbent
- Assumed office June 30, 2022
- Preceded by: Lucy Torres-Gomez

Mayor of Ormoc
- In office June 30, 2016 – June 30, 2022
- Vice Mayor: Leo Locsin Jr.
- Preceded by: Edward Codilla
- Succeeded by: Lucy Torres-Gomez

Personal details
- Born: Richard Frank Icasiano Gomez; April 7, 1966 (age 60) Manila, Philippines
- Party: PFP (2023–present)
- Other political affiliations: PDP–Laban (2016–2023); NPC (2015–2016); Liberal (2009–2015); Independent (2007–2009); MAD (partylist; 2001–2007)
- Height: 185 cm (6 ft 1 in)
- Spouse: Lucy Torres (m. 1998)
- Children: 1 (Juliana)
- Education: University of the Philippines Open University (AA); University of Perpetual Help System DALTA (MBA); Cebu Technological University (D.P.A)
- Occupation: Actor; athlete; model; television presenter; politician; sports administrator
- Sports career
- Country: Philippines
- Sport: Fencing, shooting
- Events: Épée (fencing); Clay pigeon (shooting)
Medal record
Men's fencing
Representing Philippines
Gold medal – first place	2003 Hanoi	Team épée
Gold medal – first place	2005 Manila	Team épée
Silver medal – second place	1997 Jakarta	Individual épée
Silver medal – second place	2001 Kuala Lumpur	Individual épée
Men's shooting
Representing Philippines
Silver medal – second place	2025 Thailand	Sporting clays Team
Bronze medal – third place	2025 Thailand	Shotgun – Compak sporting Team

Richard Frank Icasiano Gomez (Tagalog pronunciation: [ˈgɔmɛs]; born April 7, 1966) is a Filipino actor, TV host, politician, and épée fencer. He has been serving as the Representative of Leyte's 4th district since 2022, and was mayor of Ormoc from 2016 to 2022.

== Early life and education ==
Richard Frank Icasiano Gomez in Manila on April 7, 1966 as an only child of his parents. His father was a racecar driver and his mother Stella Suarez was a actress active in the 1960s. He was into sports as a child, focusing on volleyball from elementary to high school. Gomez later studied at the Polytechnic University of the Philippines for his collegiate studies.

Gomez's parents separated and by high school, Gomez was already living with his grandmother. For his secondary education he attended the Arellano University. After graduating, Gomez worked at McDonald's until 1983. He was into sports as a child, focusing on volleyball from elementary to high school. Gomez later studied at the Polytechnic University of the Philippines for his collegiate studies.

Gomez attended a summer intensive course in mass communication and film at the New York University in 1994. Shortly after he began his anti-drug advocacy.

He earned a doctorate in public administration from the Cebu Technological University in 2019.

== Entertainment career ==
Gomez was scouted by Douglas Quijano who became his talent manager while he was working at McDonald's. Quijano was an associate and friend of his mother.

His first major role in a feature film was Inday Bote which premiered in 1986. He co-starred with Maricel Soriano. He was offered the role originally intended for Gabby Concepcion by Lily Monteverde of Regal Films.

In 2002, he transferred to GMA network with his first melodrama show, Ang Iibigin Ay Ikaw and its sequel Ang Iibigin Ay Ikaw Pa Rin as well as presenting S-Files. His first GMA sitcom was Lagot Ka, Isusumbong Kita which aired from 2003 to 2007.

Gomez hosted the Philippine edition of Family Feud on GMA Network. He is a former GMA Network contract artist under GMA Artist Center (now Sparkle GMA Artist Center).

After his movie Filipinas in 2003, Gomez made a comeback in the indie film Bente which starred Senator Jinggoy Estrada and Iza Calzado. He briefly returned to GMA Network in the weekly drama anthology, Claudine, and returned to the Kapatid Network The 5 Network after 17 years by hosting the weekend variety show, P.O.5.. He appeared in the drama show, My Driver Sweet Lover, and Mga Nagbabagang Bulaklak. Gomez was part of the teleseries Walang Hanggan from January 16, 2012. He co-hosted The Biggest Game Show In The World (Asia) with Joey de Leon, and appeared in the comedy-drama, Madam Chairman. In 2015, he starred in the mystery drama You're My Home with Dawn Zulueta and an ensemble cast.

== Political career ==
Gomez was appointed as presidential adviser on youth and sports in 1999 by then President Joseph Estrada.

He then became chairperson of the Mamamayan Ayaw sa Droga which sought party-list representation in the House of Representatives via the May 2001 election. He was the first nominee of the group.

MAD garnered 1.5 million votes placing second to Bayan Muna in the elections which would have guaranteed its top three nominees including Gomez seats in the House of Representatives. However the Commission on Elections (COMELEC) disqualified MAD for not representing a marginalized group as intended by the party-list sector. The Supreme Court ruled with finality in April 2002 regarding the issue ending Gomez' bid to be seated as MAD representative.

He planned to run as governor of Bulacan province but, lacking the residency requirements, ran instead as an independent in the 2007 Senatorial elections which he lost.

In 2010, he ran for a seat in the Congress for the 4th district of Leyte but was disqualified by the Commission on Elections (Comelec) for failing to establish residency in Ormoc. His wife, Lucy Torres-Gomez, took his place and won. He served as his wife's chief of staff during her term as congresswoman.

In 2013, he ran for mayor of Ormoc but lost. He was finally elected as Mayor in 2016 and was reelected in 2019.

He ran for a seat in the Congress for the 4th district of Leyte in 2022, switching places with his wife and eventually won.

== Sports ==
=== Fencing ===
Gomez competed in fencing with the épee as his weapon. Gomez first major appearance as a competing fencer was at the 1995 Finlandia Fencing Championships at the Shangri-La Plaza where he outbested national team members to claim the men's épee title.

Gomez represented the Philippines internationally at the Southeast Asian (SEA) Games as a fencer starting in the 1995 edition in Chiang Mai. He won a silver medal at the 1997 edition in Jakarta and another in the 2001 edition in Kuala Lumpur. He later won a gold medal each in the 2003 and 2005 editions He quit fencing in the SEA Games after.

He later won a gold medal for the Philippines at the Asian Master Fencing Championship in 2015.

Gomez served as president of the Philippine Fencing Association from 2016 to 2023.

=== Sports shooting ===
After taking part as a fencer at the 2001 SEA Games, Gomez took up sports shooting. Gomez competed in both fencing and shooting in the 2005 edition. In the shooting event, Gomez participated in the trap and skeet.

Gomez also competes in clay pigeon shooting. In 2022, he participated in the 4th FITASC Asian Sporting Championships, where he won the senior category silver medal at the Compak Sporting event and fourth place at the sporting clays event. Gomez is the organizer of the Sporting Clays Association of the Philippines. Gomez returns to the SEA Games in the 2025 edition in Thailand as a clay pigeon shooter.

=== Rowing ===
Gomez managed the Philippine rowing team at the 1991 SEA Games in Manila.

=== Other sports ===
Gomez was a member of the Philippine national rowing Team (1989–1991), national volleyball team (2014–2005). Gomez is also the president of the Philippine Modern Pentathlon Association.

== Personal life ==
Gomez is married to Lucy Torres. He first met Torres in 1993, when the two was working on a television commercial for the shampoo brand Lux. Their marriage took place on April 28, 1998 at the Saints Peter and Paul Parish Church in Torres' hometown of Ormoc, Leyte. They have one daughter, Juliana (b. 2000), who grew up to be a fencer.

== Alleged connection to Albuera shooting incident ==
Gomez and his wife, incumbent Ormoc mayor Lucy Torres-Gomez, were alleged by Albuera, Leyte mayoral candidate Kerwin Espinosa to possibly be connected to an assassination attempt on the latter's life on April 10, 2025. In his claim, Espinosa stated that Ormoc police chief Reydante Ariza, a suspect in the incident, would have only answered to the Gomez couple, though he refrained from accusing them outright of instructing Ariza to target him. Gomez has denounced Espinosa's statement, and claimed that the assassination attempt on Espinosa was "scripted".

== Filmography ==
=== Films ===
- Hindi Mo Ako Kayang Tapakan (1984) - Jun
- Naked Paradise (1985)
- Inday Bote (1985) - Edward Salameda
- Mga Kwento ni Lola Basyang ("Zombie" segment) (1985) - Zombie
- I Can't Stop Loving You (1985) - Alvin Laurel
- Yesterday, Today and Tomorrow (1986)
- Blusang Itim (1986) - Angelo
- When I Fall in Love (1986) - Dong
- Balimbing: Mga Taong Hunyango (1986)
- Paalam... Bukas ang Kasal Ko (1986) - Paul Raymundo
- Super Islaw and the Flying Kids (1986) - Islaw/Super Islaw
- Nasaan Ka Nang Kailangan Kita (1986) - Dinky
- Tuklaw (1986)
- Once Upon a Time (1987) - Rommel
- Tagos ng Dugo (1987) - Pepito
- Forward March (1987) - Danny
- Ibigay Mo sa Akin ang Bukas (1987)
- Kid, Huwag Kang Susuko (1987) - Cesar 'Shawie' Arroyo
- Paano Kung Wala Ka Na (1987) - Sonny
- Kumander Gringa (1987)
- Fly Me to the Moon (1988) - Prinsipe Dax
- Stupid Cupid ("Forever My Love" segment) (1988) - Ruel
- Nasaan Ka Inay (1988) - Donald
- Buy One, Take One (1988)
- Nagbabagang Luha (1988) - Bien
- Sa Akin Pa Rin ang Bukas (1988)
- Lamat sa Kristal (1988)
- Babaing Hampaslupa (1988) - Jimmy
- Kailan Mahuhusgahan ang Kasalanan (1989) - Robert Quintana
- Kahit Wala Ka Na (1989) - Patrick
- Impaktita (1989) - Rudy
- Eastwood & Bronson: Palibhasa Detektib (1989) - Eastwood
- Rape of Virginia P. (1989)
- Isang Araw Walang Diyos (1989) - Lt.Cary Altamonte
- Rosenda (1989) - Efren
- Dyesebel (1990)- Edward
- Nagsimula sa Puso (1990)- Carlo
- Hanggang Saan ang Tapang Mo (1990) - Ruben Alejandro
- Kapag Langit ang Humatol (1990) - Hector
- Iputok Mo... Dadapa Ako! (Hard to Die) (1990) - Tricycle driver
- Lover's Delight (1990) - Machete
- Shake, Rattle & Roll II (1990; "Aswang" segment) - Tricycle driver
- I Want to Live (1991)
- Para sa Iyo ang Huling Bala Ko (1991) - Quintin
- Hihintayin Kita sa Langit (1991) - Gabriel
- Buburahin Kita sa Mundo (1991) - Rodel Segovia
- Akin ang Pangarap Mo (1992) - Leo Hidalgo
- True Confessions (Evelyn, Myrna & Maggie) (1992)
- Lumayo Ka Nga sa Akin (1992) - Raul
- Ikaw ang Lahat sa Akin (1992) - Cesar
- Iisa Pa Lamang (1992) - Arman
- Buddy en Sol (Sine Ito) (1992)
- Ang Siga at ang Sosyal (1992)-Aris
- Paminsan-minsan (1992)
- Ngayon at Kailanman (1992) - Edwin Torres
- Ikaw Pa Lang ang Minahal (1992) - David
- Saan Ka Man Naroroon (1993) - Miguel Relosa
- Wating (1994) - Ardo
- Bakit Pa Kita Minahal (1994) - Teddy
- Maalaala Mo Kaya: The Movie (1994) - Mike
- Sana'y Mapatawad Mo (1994) - Bong
- Kapantay Ay Langit (1994) - Steve
- Eskapo (1995) - Sergio Osmeña III
- Sa'yo Lamang (1995)- Andrew
- Dahas (1995) - Jake
- Kahit Kailan (1996) - Raul
- Hanggang Kailan Kita Mamahalin (1997) - Mike Reyes
- Walang Katumbas ang Dugo (1998) - Carlos Romano
- Ang Babae sa Bintana (1998) - Mitch
- Linlang (1999) - Lance
- Minsan, Minahal Kita (2000) - Albert Simone
- Ikaw Lamang Hanggang Ngayon (2002) - Ryan
- Mano Po (2002) - Raf
- Walang Kapalit (2003) - Dennis Rustia
- Filipinas (2003) - Samuel Filipinas
- Eternity (2006) - Fencing Instructor
- Bente (2009) - Roman
- Sonata (2013)
- She's Dating the Gangster (2014) - Adult Kenji
- The Janitor (2014)
- The Trial (2014) - Julian Bien
- The Love Affair (2015)- Vince Ramos
- Love Me Tomorrow (2016)- cameo
- Three Words to Forever (2018) - Rick Andrada
- Salvageland (2025) - PO3 Ernesto Morales

=== Television ===
Year	Title	Role
1987–1998	Palibhasa Lalake	Goma/Ricky/Ricardo
1994–1995	Tondominium	Charlie
1997–2002; 2011–2016	ASAP	Host
1998–2001	Richard Loves Lucy	Richard/Goma
2001	Your Honor	
2002–2003	Ang Iibigin Ay Ikaw	Waldo Sandoval
2003	Ang Iibigin Ay Ikaw Pa Rin	Waldo Sandoval
2002–2007	S-Files	Host
2003–2007	Lagot Ka, Isusumbong Kita	Ric
2004–2005	Forever in My Heart	Raphael Cruzado
2005	Balikbayan	Guest
2005	Encantadia	Raquim
2006	Encantadia: Pag-ibig Hanggang Wakas	Raquim
2006–2007	Captain Barbell	Viel Villan / The General
2007–2008	Marimar	Renato Santibañez
2008	The Sweet Life	Guest
2008	Codename: Asero	Ibsen Abesamis/Agent Zeus
2008	Obra	Guest
2008–2009	Family Feud	Host
2009	All About Eve	Frederico Gonzales
2010–2011	P.O.5	Host
2010–2011	My Driver Sweet Lover	Delfin
2011	Mga Nagbabagang Bulaklak	Apollo Ortega
2011	100 Days to Heaven	Tagabantay (an ice cream vendor)
2011	My Binondo Girl	Yong Shu Syneryn
2012	The Biggest Game Show In The World (Asia)	Host
2012	Walang Hanggan	Marco Montenegro
2012	Gandang Gabi, Vice!	Guest
2012	Toda Max	Ricky
2013	It's Showtime	Guest
2013–2014	Top Gear Philippines	Host
2014	Madam Chairman	Ex-Boyfriend
2014–2015	Quiet Please!: Bawal ang Maingay	Host
2015	Sabado Badoo	Cameo Featured Footage
2015–2016	You're My Home	Gabriel Fontanilla
2016	Maalaala Mo Kaya: Traysikel	Raphael
2017	Kapuso Mo, Jessica Soho	Guest
2025	Fast Talk with Boy Abunda	Guest

== Awards and nominations ==
=== Film ===
- FAMAS Award for Best Actor for The Love Affair (nominee)
- Gawad TANGLAW Awards 2015 for Best Supporting Actor for The Trial
- 17th Gawad PASADO Awards 2015 for PinakaPASADOng Katuwang na Aktor for The Trial
- FAMAS Award for Best Actor for Filipinas (nominee)
- FAMAS Award for Best Actor for Dahas
- FAP Award for Best Actor for Dahas (tied with Fernando Poe Jr. for Kahit Butas ng Karayom)
- Gawad Urian Award for Best Actor for Dahas (nominee)
- Gawad Urian Award for Best Actor for Waiting
- Gawad Urian Award for Best Actor for Ikaw Ang Lahat Sa Akin (nominee)
- Gawad Urian Award for Best Actor for Saan Ka Man Naroroon
- Gawad Urian Award for Best Actor for Nagsimula sa Puso (nominee)
- Gawad Urian Award for Best Actor for Hihintayin Kita Sa Langit
- Metro Manila Film Festival 2003 for People's Choice Awards for Best Actor for Filipinas
- Metro Manila Film Festival 1995 for Best Actor for Dahas
- Star Awards for Movies: Actor of the Year for Dahas (1996)

=== Television ===
- 23rd PMPC Star Awards for TV Best Game Show Host for Family Feud (Philippine Edition)
- 26th PMPC Star Awards for TV Best Drama Actor for Walang Hanggan (nominee)
- Golden Screen TV Awards 2013 Outstanding Performance by an Actor in a Drama Series for Walang Hanggan
- 30th PMPC Star Awards for TV Best Drama Actor for You're My Home (nominee)

=== Others ===
- Metro Manila Film Festival 2011 for Ellen Lising Male Face of the Night
- GMMSF Box-Office Entertainment Awards 2013 for All Time Favorite Love Team on Movies and TV (with Dawn Zulueta)
