= Jeux sans frontières season 4 =

Jeux sans frontières
- Season 4
- No. of teams: 6 countries
- Winner: (West Germany) Osterholz-Scharmbeck
- Runner-up: (Switzerland) Stans
- Head referees: Gennaro Olivieri; Guido Pancaldi
- No. of episodes: 7

Release
- Original release: 3 July – 11 September 1968

Season chronology
- ← Previous; Season 3 Next → Season 5

The 4th season of the international television game show Jeux sans frontières was held in the summer of 1968. Broadcasters from Belgium, France, Italy, Switzerland, the United Kingdom, and West Germany participated in the competition coordinated by the European Broadcasting Union (EBU). The different heats were hosted by each of the participant broadcasters in locations in their countries such as Vigevano (Italy), Verviers (Belgium), Siegen and Schwäbisch Hall (West Germany), Zofingen (Switzerland), and Harrogate (United Kingdom). The grand final was held in Brussels (Belgium). The head international referees in charge of supervising the competition were Gennaro Olivieri and Guido Pancaldi.

France participated in the season, but due to industrial action with ORTF during the civil unrest in the country, they were unable to broadcast any of the season domestically and had to cancel hosting their designated heat. ORTF was going to host Heat 1 in Paris, but they moved the heat to Épinal first and canceled it later. The teams that were going to participate in this heat were relocated to an additional last heat hosted by ARD in Schwäbisch Hall.

The season was won by the team from Osterholz-Scharmbeck, West Germany, being the runner-up the team from Stans, Switzerland.

== Participants ==
Country	Broadcaster	Code	Colour
Belgium	RTB	B	Yellow
France	ORTF	F	Purple
Italy	RAI	I	Blue
Switzerland	SRG SSR TSI	CH	Gold
United Kingdom	BBC	GB	Red
West Germany	ARD	D	Light blue

== Heats ==
=== Heat 1 ===
Heat 1 was hosted by DRS on behalf of SRG SSR TSI on 3 July 1968 in Zofingen, Switzerland, presented by Mäni Weber and Jan Hiermeyer.

Place	Country	Town	Points
1	D	Kaufbeuren	49
2	B	Watermael-Boitsfort	47
3	CH	Zofingen	46
4	F	Haguenau	40
5	GB	New Brighton	33
6	I	Trani	29

=== Heat 2 ===
Heat 2 was hosted by RTB on 17 July 1968 in Verviers, Belgium, presented by Paule Herreman and Jean-Claude Mennessier.

Place	Country	Town	Points
1	I	Terracina	51
2	B	Verviers	48
3	D	Homburg	48
4	GB	Plymouth	40
5	CH	Bellinzona	34
6	F	Saint-Quentin	28

=== Heat 3 ===
Heat 3 was hosted by RAI on 31 July 1968 in Vigevano, Italy, presented by Renata Mauro, Enzo Tortora and Giulio Marchetti.

Place	Country	Town	Points
1	B	Bressoux	50
2	D	Landau	43
3	F	Libourne	41
4	I	Pordenone	36
5	CH	Estavayer-le-Lac	34
6	GB	Merton	32

=== Heat 4 ===
Heat 4 was hosted by the BBC on 14 August 1968 in Harrogate, United Kingdom, presented by David Vine and Eddie Waring.

Place	Country	Town	Points
1	D	Osterholz-Scharmbeck	47
2	CH	Stans	40
3	F	Vannes	38
3	GB	Dundee	38
5	I	Ascoli Piceno	37
6	B	Mons	28

=== Heat 5 ===
Heat 5 was hosted by ARD on 28 August 1968 in Siegen, West Germany, presented by Camillo Felgen.

Place	Country	Town	Points
1	D	Siegen	48
2	GB	Cheltenham	44
3	I	Biella	39
4	CH	Mendrisio	37
5	B	Winschoten	36
6	F	Épinal	36

=== Heat 6 ===
Heat 6 was hosted by ARD on 4 September 1968 in Schwäbisch Hall, West Germany, presented by Camillo Felgen.

Place	Country	Town	Points
1	D	Inzell	52
2	GB	Worthing	46
3	I	Alghero	40
4	F	Cancale	39
5	B	Bastogne	35
6	CH	Neuchâtel	31

=== Qualifiers ===
Country	Town	Place won	Points won
I	Terracina	1	51
B	Bressoux	1	50
D	Osterholz-Scharmbeck	1	47
GB	Worthing	2	46
CH	Stans	2	40
F	Vannes	3	38

== Final ==
The final was hosted by RTB on 11 September 1968 at the Grand-Place in Brussels, Belgium, presented by Paule Herreman and Jean-Claude Mennessier.

Place	Country	Town	Points
1	D	Osterholz-Scharmbeck	41
2	CH	Stans	39
3	F	Vannes	33
4	GB	Worthing	32
5	B	Bressoux	27
6	I	Terracina	24
