= Jeux sans frontières season 6 =

Jeux sans frontières
- Season 6
- No. of teams: 7 countries
- Winner: (Italy) Como
- Runner-up: (Netherlands) Alphen aan den Rijn
- Head referees: Gennaro Olivieri; Guido Pancaldi
- No. of episodes: 8

Release
- Original release: 9 June – 16 September 1970

Season chronology
- ← Previous; Season 5 Next → Season 7

The 6th season of the international television game show Jeux sans frontières was held in the summer of 1970. Broadcasters from Belgium, France, Italy, Switzerland, the United Kingdom, West Germany and, for the first time, the Netherlands participated in the competition coordinated by the European Broadcasting Union (EBU). The different heats were hosted by each of the participant broadcasters in locations in their countries such as Como (Italy), Namur (Belgium), West Berlin (West Germany), Groningen (Netherlands), Avignon (France), Lugano (Switzerland), and Cardiff (United Kingdom). The grand final was held in Verona (Italy). The head international referees in charge of supervising the competition were Gennaro Olivieri and Guido Pancaldi.

This was the first season produced in color. It was won by the team from Como, Italy, being the runner-up the team from Alphen aan den Rijn, Netherlands.

== Participants ==
Country	Broadcaster	Code	Colour
Belgium	RTB / BRT	B	Yellow
France	ORTF	F	Purple
Italy	RAI	I	Blue
Netherlands	NCRV	NL	Orange
Switzerland	SRG SSR TSI	CH	Gold
United Kingdom	BBC	GB	Red
West Germany	ARD	D	Light blue

== Heats ==
=== Heats 1 ===
Heat 1 was hosted by RAI on 9 June 1970 at the grounds of Villa Olmo in Como, Italy, presented by Renata Mauro and Giulio Marchetti.

Place	Country	Town	Points
1	I	Como	40
2	D	Kelheim	37
2	CH	Schwyz	37
4	NL	Dronten	36
5	B	Deurne	32
5	F	Albi	32
7	GB	South Shields	25

=== Heat 2 ===
Heat 2 was hosted by TSI on behalf of SRG SSR TSI on 24 June 1970 in Lugano, Switzerland, presented by Mascia Cantoni and Tiziano Colotti.

Place	Country	Town	Points
1	F	Aix-les-Bains	48
2	D	Uelzen	41
3	B	Zelzate	35
3	I	Acquasparta	35
5	NL	Assen	34
5	GB	Exmouth	34
7	CH	Poschiavo	25

=== Heat 3 ===
Heat 3 was hosted by RTB on 8 July 1970 in Namur, Belgium, presented by Paule Herreman and Michel Lemaire.

Place	Country	Town	Points
1	CH	Vevey	42
1	B	Namur	42
3	D	Delmenhorst	39
4	NL	Genemuiden	37
5	GB	Aberdeen	28
6	F	Lille	27
7	I	Syracuse	21

=== Heat 4 ===
Heat 4 was hosted by ORTF on 22 July 1970 in Avignon, France, presented by Guy Lux and Simone Garnier. This heat was the first to be broadcast in colour.

Place	Country	Town	Points
1	D	Radevormwald	48
2	B	Ath	40
3	I	Barletta	37
4	CH	Savognin	36
5	F	Avignon	32
6	NL	Bolsward	30
7	GB	Caernarfon	26

=== Heat 5 ===
Heat 5 was hosted by the BBC on 5 August 1970 at the grounds of the castle in Cardiff, United Kingdom, presented by David Vine and Eddie Waring.

Place	Country	Town	Points
1	CH	Locarno	40
1	B	Genk	40
3	I	Rimini	37
3	GB	Lowestoft	37
3	NL	Hoogland	37
6	D	Kleve	36
7	F	Reims	25

=== Heat 6 ===
Heat 6 was hosted by NCRV on 19 August 1970 in Groningen, Netherlands, presented by Ted de Braak, Dick Passchier and Barend Barendse.

Place	Country	Town	Points
1	B	Verviers	43
2	NL	Aalten	39
3	D	Andernach	36
4	F	Angoulême	35
5	GB	Margate	32
6	CH	Estavayer-le-Lac	28
6	I	Bassano del Grappa	28

=== Heat 7 ===
Heat 7 was hosted by ARD on 2 September 1970 in West Berlin, West Germany, presented by Camillo Felgen and Timm Elstner.

Place	Country	Town	Points
1	D	Gelnhausen	43
2	NL	Alphen aan den Rijn	40
3	GB	Great Yarmouth	39
4	CH	Widnau	34
5	B	Woluwe-Saint-Lambert	32
6	F	Saint-Malo	28
7	I	Ancona	23

=== Qualifiers ===
The teams with the most points from each country advanced to the grand final:

Country	Town	Place won	Points won
F	Aix-les-Bains	1	48
D	Radevormwald	1	48
B	Verviers	1	43
CH	Vevey	1	42
I	Como	1	40
NL	Alphen aan den Rijn	2	40
GB	Great Yarmouth	3	39

== Final ==
The final was hosted by RAI on 16 September 1970 at the Arena in Verona, Italy, presented by Renata Mauro and Giulio Marchetti.

Place	Country	Town	Points
1	I	Como	44
2	NL	Alphen aan den Rijn	42
3	D	Radevormwald	37
4	B	Verviers	31
5	GB	Great Yarmouth	30
6	F	Aix-les-Bains	26
7	CH	Vevey	25
