= Jeux sans frontières season 3 =

Jeux sans frontières
- Season 3
- No. of teams: 6 countries
- Winner: (West Germany) Bardenberg
- Runner-up: (France) Nogent-sur-Marne
- Head referees: Gennaro Olivieri; Guido Pancaldi
- No. of episodes: 7

Release
- Original release: 14 June – 6 September 1967

Season chronology
- ← Previous; Season 2 Next → Season 4

The 3rd season of the international television game show Jeux sans frontières was held in the summer of 1967. Broadcasters from Belgium, France, Italy, West Germany and, for the first time, Switzerland and the United Kingdom participated in the competition coordinated by the European Broadcasting Union (EBU). The different heats were hosted by each of the participant broadcasters in locations in their countries such as Vincennes (France), Pisa (Italy), Brussels (Belgium), Straubing (West Germany), Locarno (Switzerland), and Blackpool (United Kingdom). The grand final was held in Bardenberg (West Germany). The head international referees in charge of supervising the competition were Gennaro Olivieri and Guido Pancaldi.

For this season, the neutral jury and the "Game of Questions" were discarded, and jokers (which allowed a team to double their score) were introduced. In addition, all of the participating teams played in one location rather than in two separate ones. The "jeu handicap" ("handicap game") was also introduced, which was played as the final game.

The season was won by the team from Bardenberg, West Germany, the runner-up being the team from Nogent-sur-Marne, France.

== Participants ==
Country	Broadcaster	Code	Colour
Belgium	RTB	B	Yellow
France	ORTF	F	Purple
Italy	RAI	I	Blue
Switzerland	SRG SSR TSI	CH	Gold
United Kingdom	BBC	GB	Red
West Germany	ARD	D	Light blue

== Heats ==
=== Heat 1 ===
Heat 1 was hosted by ORTF on 14th June 1967 at the Château in Vincennes, France, presented by Guy Lux and Simone Garnier.

Place	Country	Town	Points
1	F	Nogent-sur-Marne	54
2	CH	Martigny	51
3	I	Caserta	44
3	D	Eutin	44
5	B	Dinant	43
6	GB	Bridlington	34

=== Heat 2 ===
Heat 2 was hosted by RTB on 28 June 1967 on the Heysel/Heizel Plateau in Brussels, Belgium, presented by Paule Herreman and Jean-Claude Mennessier

Place	Country	Town	Points
1	D	Bardenberg	52
2	B	Ciney	49
3	GB	Lytham St. Annes	35
4	CH	Lugano	33
4	I	Orvieto	33
6	F	Les Sables-d'Olonne	25

=== Heat 3 ===
Heat 3 was hosted by TSI on behalf of SRG SSR TSI on 12 July 1967 in Locarno, Switzerland, presented by Mascia Cantoni and Enzo Tortora.

Place	Country	Town	Points
1	B	Ath	46
2	CH	St. Gallen	45
3	D	Villingen	43
3	F	Anglet	43
5	GB	Llandudno	38
6	I	Cefalù	32

=== Heat 4 ===
Heat 4 was hosted by RAI on 26 July 1967 in Pisa, Italy, presented by Renata Mauro and Enzo Tortora.

Place	Country	Town	Points
1	I	Montecatini Terme	45
2	B	Verviers	38
3	D	Lindenberg	37
4	F	Quimper	36
5	CH	Plan-les-Ouates	33
6	GB	Hawick	15

=== Heat 5 ===
Heat 5 was hosted by ARD on 9 August 1967 in Straubing, West Germany, presented by Camillo Felgen.

Place	Country	Town	Points
1	D	Straubing	51
2	I	Arona	43
3	GB	Worthing	42
4	CH	Solothurn	37
5	F	Annemasse	35
6	B	Arlon	28

=== Heat 6 ===
Heat 6 was hosted by the BBC on 23 August 1967 in Blackpool, United Kingdom, presented by David Vine and McDonald Hobley.

Place	Country	Town	Points
1	D	Duderstadt	46
2	I	Riccione	45
3	GB	Cheltenham	43
4	B	Forest	38
5	CH	Lucerne	35
6	F	Armentières	33

=== Qualifiers ===
Country	Town	Place won	Points won
F	Nogent-sur-Marne	1	54
D	Bardenberg	1	52
B	Ath	1	46
I	Montecatini Terme	1	45
CH	Martigny	2	51
GB	Cheltenham	3	43

== Final ==
The final was hosted by ARD on 6 September 1967 in Bardenberg, West Germany, presented by Camillo Felgen.

Place	Country	Town	Points
1	D	Bardenberg	49
2	F	Nogent-sur-Marne	36
3	GB	Cheltenham	35
3	I	Montecatini Terme	35
5	CH	Matigny	32
6	B	Ath	27

=== Broadcasts ===
Broadcasters of the final – 6 September 1967
Country	Broadcaster	Channel(s)	Commentator(s)	Ref(s)
Belgium	RTB	RTB	Paule Herreman	
Germany	ARD	Deutsches Fernsehen		
Italy	RAI	Secondo Programma TV (Note: Deferred broadcast the following day at 22:05 (CET))	Renata Mauro and Giulio Marchetti	
France	ORTF	Première Chaîne	Simone Garnier	
Switzerland	SRG SSR	TSR	Georges Kleinmann	
United Kingdom	BBC	BBC1	David Vine	
