= Jeux sans frontières season 8 =

Jeux sans frontières
- Season 8
- No. of teams: 7 countries
- Winner: (Switzerland) La Chaux-de-Fonds
- Runner-up: (Italy) Città di Castello
- Head referees: Gennaro Olivieri; Guido Pancaldi
- No. of episodes: 8

Release
- Original release: 23 May – 13 September 1972

Season chronology
- ← Previous; Season 7 Next → Season 9

The 8th season of the international television game show Jeux sans frontières was held in the summer of 1972. Broadcasters from Belgium, France, Italy, the Netherlands, Switzerland, the United Kingdom, and West Germany participated in the competition coordinated by the European Broadcasting Union (EBU). The different heats were hosted by each of the participant broadcasters in locations in their countries such as Passariano di Codroipo (Italy), Spa (Belgium), Westerland (West Germany), Delft (Netherlands), Nice (France), Bern (Switzerland), and Sheffield (United Kingdom). The grand final was held in Lausanne (Switzerland). The head international referees in charge of supervising the competition were Gennaro Olivieri and Guido Pancaldi.

The season was won by the team from La Chaux-de-Fonds, Switzerland, the runner-up being the team from Città di Castello, Italy.

== Participants ==
Country	Broadcaster	Code	Colour
Belgium	RTB / BRT	B	Yellow
France	ORTF	F	Purple
Italy	RAI	I	Blue
Netherlands	NCRV	NL	Orange
Switzerland	SRG SSR TSI	CH	Gold
United Kingdom	BBC	GB	Red
West Germany	ARD	D	Light blue

== Heats ==
=== Heat 1 ===
Heat 1 was hosted by RTB on 23 May 1972 in Spa, Belgium, presented by Paule Herreman and Michel Lemaire.

Place	Country	Town	Points
1	GB	Salisbury	48
2	CH	La Chaux-de-Fonds	44
3	D	Hirschau	38
4	F	Anglet	28
5	NL	Franeker	26
6	B	Spa	25
7	I	Ostuni	19

=== Heats 2 ===
Heat 2 was hosted by TV DRS on behalf of SRG SSR TSI on 7 June 1972 in Bern, Switzerland, presented by Jan Hiermeyer.

Place	Country	Town	Points
1	D	Waldkraiburg	43
2	I	Terracina	42
3	CH	Jegenstorf	39
4	NL	IJsselstein	36
5	B	Gembloux	30
6	F	Thiers	23
7	GB	Banbury	22

=== Heat 3 ===
Heat 3 was hosted by ARD on 20 June 1972 in Westerland, West Germany, presented by Camillo Felgen and Frank Elstner.

Place	Country	Town	Points
1	D	Westerland	47
2	CH	Massagno	42
3	NL	Ridderkerk	40
4	GB	Folkestone	37
5	I	Carpi	30
6	B	Middelkerke	22
7	F	Angoulême	17

=== Heat 4 ===
Heat 4 was hosted by RAI on 5 July 1972 at the grounds of Villa Manin in Passariano di Codroipo, Italy, presented by Giulio Marchetti and Rosanna Vaudetti.

Place	Country	Town	Points
1	NL	Venray	44
2	I	Codroipo	38
3	D	Oberursel	36
4	B	Zottegem	31
5	F	Moëlan-sur-Mer	30
6	GB	Dalkeith	28
7	CH	Sarnen	23

=== Heat 5 ===
Heat 5 was hosted by ORTF on 19 July 1972 in Nice, France, presented by Guy Lux and Simone Garnier.

Place	Country	Town	Points
1	I	Città di Castello	40
1	D	Rodenkirchen	40
3	CH	Thônex	39
4	GB	Lincoln	37
5	NL	Zelhem	27
6	B	Bouillon	23
7	F	Nice	19

=== Heat 6 ===
Heat 6 was hosted by the BBC on 2 August 1972 in Sheffield, United Kingdom, presented by Stuart Hall and Eddie Waring.

Place	Country	Town	Points
1	D	Bad Münstereifel	43
2	GB	Congleton	40
3	NL	Lisse	36
4	CH	Küsnacht	33
5	B	Woluwe-Saint-Pierre	29
6	F	Gap	28
7	I	Pontedera	19

=== Heat 7 ===
Heat 7 was hosted by NCRV on 16 August 1972 in Delft, Netherlands, presented by Dick Passchier and Barend Barendse.

Place	Country	Town	Points
1	GB	Luton	43
2	D	Ahrensburg	36
3	NL	Bladel	35
4	B	Leuven	34
5	I	Sermoneta	33
6	CH	Giubiasco	31
7	F	Saintes	24

=== Qualifiers ===
The teams with the most points from each country advanced to the grand final:

Country	Town	Place won	Points won
GB	Salisbury	1	48
D	Westerland	1	47
NL	Venray	1	44
I	Città di Castello	1	40
CH	La Chaux-de-Fonds	2	44
B	Leuven	4	34
F	Anglet	4	28

== Final ==
The final was hosted by TSR on behalf of SRG SSR TSI on 13 September 1972 in Lausanne, Switzerland, presented by Georges Kleinmann and Madeleine Stalder.

Place	Country	Town	Points
1	CH	La Chaux-de-Fonds	42
2	I	Città di Castello	38
2	NL	Venray	38
4	F	Anglet	36
4	GB	Salisbury	36
6	D	Westerland	35
7	B	Leuven	25
