= Jeux sans frontières season 5 =

Jeux sans frontières
- Season 5
- No. of teams: 5 countries
- Winners: (West Germany) Wolfsburg (United Kingdom) Shrewsbury
- Head referees: Gennaro Olivieri; Guido Pancaldi
- No. of episodes: 6

Release
- Original release: 25 June – 3 September 1969

Season chronology
- ← Previous; Season 4 Next → Season 6

The 5th season of the international television game show Jeux sans frontières was held in the summer of 1969. Broadcasters from Belgium, Italy, Switzerland, the United Kingdom, and West Germany participated in the competition coordinated by the European Broadcasting Union (EBU), with France withdrawing in order to recover from the effects of the 1968 protests. The different heats were hosted by each of the participant broadcasters in locations in their countries such as Caserta (Italy), Bruges (Belgium), Wolfsburg (West Germany), Martigny (Switzerland), and Edinburgh (United Kingdom). The grand final was held in Blackpool (United Kingdom). The head international referees in charge of supervising the competition were Gennaro Olivieri and Guido Pancaldi.

The season was won by the teams from Wolfsburg, West Germany and Shrewsbury, United Kingdom.

== Participants ==
| Country | Broadcaster | Code | Colour |
|---|---|---|---|
| Belgium | RTB / BRT | B | Yellow |
| Italy | RAI | I | Blue |
| Switzerland | SRG SSR TSI | CH | Gold |
| United Kingdom | BBC | GB | Red |
| West Germany | ARD | D | Light blue |

== Heats ==
=== Heat 1 ===
Heat 1 was hosted by BRT on 25 June 1969 at the Markt in Bruges, Belgium, presented by Jan Theys.

| Place | Country | Town | Points |
|---|---|---|---|
| 1 | I | Adria | 33 |
| 2 | D | Lauingen | 32 |
| 3 | CH | Interlaken | 29 |
| 4 | GB | Hastings | 24 |
| 5 | B | Bruges-Zeebrugge | 20 |

=== Heat 2 ===
Heat 2 was hosted by the BBC on 9 July 1969 at the grounds of the George Heriot's School in Edinburgh, United Kingdom, presented by David Vine and Eddie Waring.

| Place | Country | Town | Points |
|---|---|---|---|
| 1 | GB | Shrewsbury | 32 |
| 2 | D | Weiden | 30 |
| 2 | I | Lecco | 30 |
| 4 | CH | Lausanne | 29 |
| 5 | B | Ixelles | 19 |

=== Heat 3 ===
Heat 3 was hosted by RAI on 23 July 1969 at the grounds of the Royal Palace in Caserta, Italy, presented by Enzo Tortora, Renata Mauro and Giulio Marchetti.

| Place | Country | Town | Points |
|---|---|---|---|
| 1 | CH | Arth-Goldau | 33 |
| 2 | I | Frascati | 32 |
| 3 | D | Kempen | 28 |
| 3 | GB | Cardiff | 28 |
| 5 | B | Andenne | 17 |

=== Heat 4 ===
Heat 4 was hosted by TSR on behalf of SRG SSR TSI on 6 August 1969 at the municipal swimming pool in Martigny, Switzerland, presented by Georges Kleinmann and Madeleine Stalder.

| Place | Country | Town | Points |
|---|---|---|---|
| 1 | CH | Martigny | 34 |
| 2 | I | Foggia | 33 |
| 3 | D | Minden | 29 |
| 4 | GB | Dunbar | 24 |
| 5 | B | Halle | 16 |

=== Heat 5 ===
Heat 5 was hosted by ARD on 20 August 1969 in Wolfsburg, West Germany, presented by Camillo Felgen and Timm Elstner.

| Place | Country | Town | Points |
|---|---|---|---|
| 1 | D | Wolfsburg | 33 |
| 2 | I | Alba | 32 |
| 3 | CH | Chiasso | 28 |
| 4 | GB | Coleraine | 25 |
| 5 | B | Gosselies | 20 |

=== Qualifiers ===
The teams with the most points from each country advanced to the grand final:

| Country | Town | Place won | Points won |
|---|---|---|---|
| CH | Martigny | 1 | 34 |
| D | Wolfsburg | 1 | 33 |
| I | Adria | 1 | 33 |
| GB | Shrewsbury | 1 | 32 |
| B | Bruges-Zeebrugge | 5 | 20 |

== Final ==
The final was hosted by the BBC on 3 September 1969 in Blackpool, United Kingdom, presented by David Vine and Eddie Waring.

| Place | Country | Town | Points |
|---|---|---|---|
| 1 | GB | Shrewsbury | 32 |
| 1 | D | Wolfsburg | 32 |
| 3 | B | Bruges-Zeebrugge | 31 |
| 4 | I | Adria | 26 |
| 5 | CH | Martigny | 24 |
