= Jeux sans frontières season 7 =

Jeux sans frontières
- Season 7
- No. of teams: 7 countries
- Winner: (United Kingdom) Blackpool
- Runner-up: (Netherlands) Alphen aan den Rijn
- Head referees: Gennaro Olivieri; Guido Pancaldi
- No. of episodes: 8

Release
- Original release: 9 June – 15 September 1971

Season chronology
- ← Previous; Season 6 Next → Season 8

The 7th season of the international television game show Jeux sans frontières was held in the summer of 1971. Broadcasters from Belgium, France, Italy, the Netherlands, Switzerland, the United Kingdom, and West Germany participated in the competition coordinated by the European Broadcasting Union (EBU). The different heats were hosted by each of the participant broadcasters in locations in their countries such as Riccione (Italy), Ostend (Belgium), Offenburg (West Germany), Rotterdam (Netherlands), Vichy (France), Solothurn (Switzerland), and Blackpool (United Kingdom). The grand final was held in Essen (West Germany). The head international referees in charge of supervising the competition were Gennaro Olivieri and Guido Pancaldi.

The season was won by the team from Blackpool, United Kingdom, the runner-up being the team from Alphen aan den Rijn, Netherlands.

== Participants ==
Country	Broadcaster	Code	Colour
Belgium	RTB / BRT	B	Yellow
France	ORTF	F	Purple
Italy	RAI	I	Blue
Netherlands	NCRV	NL	Orange
Switzerland	SRG SSR TSI	CH	Gold
United Kingdom	BBC	GB	Red
West Germany	ARD	D	Light blue

== Heats ==
=== Heat 1 ===
Heat 1 was hosted by RAI on 9 June 1971 in Riccione, Italy, presented by Giulio Marchetti and Rosanna Vaudetti.

Place	Country	Town	Points
1	I	Riccione	48
2	D	Idar-Oberstein	42
3	NL	Linne	40
4	GB	Colwyn Bay	31
4	CH	Courrendlin	31
6	B	Ougrée	21
7	F	Alès	20

=== Heat 2 ===
Heat 2 was hosted by TV DRS on behalf of SRG SSR TSI on 23 June 1971 in Solothurn, Switzerland, presented by Jan Hiermeyer and Dorothea Furrer.

Place	Country	Town	Points
1	D	Schwabach	47
2	CH	Willisau	44
3	NL	Drachten	41
4	I	Melfi	35
5	F	Mulhouse	30
6	GB	Kendal	28
7	B	Sint-Niklaas	24

=== Heat 3 ===
Heat 3 was hosted by NCRV on 7 July 1971 at the Ahoy in Rotterdam, Netherlands, presented by Dick Passchier and Barend Barendse.

Place	Country	Town	Points
1	NL	Alphen aan den Rijn	44
2	GB	Tewkesbury	37
3	F	Le Mans	36
4	I	L’Aquila	35
5	CH	Biasca	33
6	B	Watermael-Boitsfort	31
7	D	Rheinbach	28

=== Heat 4 ===
Heat 4 was hosted by ORTF on 21 July 1971 in Vichy, France, presented by Guy Lux and Simone Garnier.

Place	Country	Town	Points
1	B	Tournai	41
2	CH	Brig	36
3	D	Bockum-Hövel	35
4	GB	Prestwick	34
4	NL	Zoetermeer	34
6	F	Vichy	31
7	I	Forio d’Ischia	29

=== Heat 5 ===
Heat 5 was hosted by ARD on 4 August 1971 in Offenburg, West Germany, presented by Camillo Felgen and Timm Elstner.

Place	Country	Town	Points
1	D	Offenburg	49
2	I	Jesolo	44
3	B	Namur	33
4	GB	Scunthorpe	32
5	NL	Winschoten	31
6	F	Nancy	28
7	CH	Colombier	26

=== Heat 6 ===
Heat 6 was hosted by the BBC on 18 August 1971 in Blackpool, United Kingdom, presented by David Vine and Eddie Waring.

Place	Country	Town	Points
1	GB	Blackpool	50
2	D	Wetter	43
3	CH	Ascona	38
4	I	Canelli	34
5	F	Saint-Malo	29
6	NL	Rolde	28
7	B	Tielt	19

=== Heat 7 ===
Heat 7 was hosted by BRT on 1 September 1971 in Ostend, Belgium, presented by Jan Theys and Willy Delabastita.

Place	Country	Town	Points
1	B	Ostend	50
2	CH	Einsiedeln	43
3	NL	Doetinchem	35
4	I	Pesaro	34
5	GB	Bournemouth	32
6	F	Libourne	23
6	D	Leck	23

=== Qualifiers ===
The teams with the most points from each country advanced to the grand final:

Country	Town	Place won	Points won
GB	Blackpool	1	50
B	Ostend	1	50
D	Offenburg	1	49
I	Riccione	1	48
NL	Alphen aan den Rijn	1	44
CH	Willisau	2	44
F	Le Mans	3	36

== Final ==
The final was hosted by ARD on 15 September 1971 in Essen, West Germany, presented by Camillo Felgen and Timm Elstner.

Place	Country	Town	Points
1	GB	Blackpool	45
2	NL	Alphen aan den Rijn	38
3	CH	Willisau	36
4	D	Offenburg	35
4	I	Riccione	35
6	B	Ostend	28
7	F	Le Mans	27
