= Jeux sans frontières season 10 =

Jeux sans frontières
- Season 10
- No. of teams: 7 countries
- Winner: (Switzerland) Muotathal
- Runner-up: (Italy) Marostica
- Head referees: Gennaro Olivieri; Guido Pancaldi
- No. of episodes: 8

Release
- Original release: 28 May – 18 September 1974

Season chronology
- ← Previous; Season 9 Next → Season 11

The 10th season of the international television game show Jeux sans frontières was held in the summer of 1974. Broadcasters from Belgium, France, Italy, the Netherlands, Switzerland, the United Kingdom, and West Germany participated in the competition coordinated by the European Broadcasting Union (EBU). The different heats were hosted by each of the participant broadcasters in locations in their countries such as Barga (Italy), Bouillon (Belgium), Bayreuth (West Germany), Zandvoort (Netherlands), Aix-les-Bains (France), Avenches (Switzerland), and Northampton (United Kingdom). The grand final was held in Leiden (Netherlands). The head international referees in charge of supervising the competition were Gennaro Olivieri and Guido Pancaldi.

The season was won by the team from Muotathal, Switzerland, the runner-up being the team from Marostica, Italy.

== Participants ==
Country	Broadcaster	Code	Colour
Belgium	RTB / BRT	B	Yellow
France	ORTF	F	Purple
Italy	RAI	I	Blue
Netherlands	NCRV	NL	Orange
Switzerland	SRG SSR TSI	CH	Gold
United Kingdom	BBC	GB	Red
West Germany	ARD	D	Light blue

== Heats ==
=== Heat 1 ===
Heat 1 was hosted by RTB on 28 May 1974 at the castle in Bouillon, Belgium, presented by Paule Herreman, Michel Lemaire and Jacques Careuil.

Place	Country	Town	Points
1	D	Rosenheim	47
2	I	Cerveteri	43
3	CH	Ilanz	38
4	B	Bouillon	35
5	NL	Wierden	29
6	GB	Southport	24
7	F	Briey	23

=== Heat 2 ===
Heat 2 was hosted by NCRV on 12 June 1974 at the circuit in Zandvoort, Netherlands, presented by Barend Barendse and Dick Passchier.

Place	Country	Town	Points
1	NL	Zandvoort	40
2	GB	Warwick	37
3	D	Bentheim	36
4	F	Aurillac	34
5	I	Mondello	33
6	B	Eeklo	28
7	CH	Lugano	23

=== Heat 3 ===
Heat 3 was hosted by RAI on 10 July 1974 at the municipal stadium in Barga, Italy, presented by Giulio Marchetti and Rosanna Vaudetti.

Place	Country	Town	Points
1	F	Nancy	44
2	I	Barga	38
3	D	Singen	36
4	CH	Gossau	34
5	GB	Rotherham	28
6	B	Edegem	27
7	NL	Andijk	16

=== Heat 4 ===
Heat 4 was hosted by TSR on behalf of SRG SSR TSI on 24 July 1974 at the Roman amphitheater in Avenches, Switzerland, presented by Georges Kleinmann and Christian Defaye.

Place	Country	Town	Points
1	GB	Farnham	40
1	I	Acqui Terme	40
3	B	Vilvoorde	34
3	CH	Avenches	34
3	F	Le Touquet	34
6	D	Urach	32
7	NL	Mill	30

=== Heat 5 ===
Heat 5 was hosted by ORTF on 7 August 1974 in Aix-les-Bains, France, presented by Guy Lux and Simone Garnier.

Place	Country	Town	Points
1	NL	Harlingen	38
2	D	Wasseralfingen	37
3	I	Fabriano	35
4	F	Aix-les-Bains	34
5	GB	Skegness	30
6	B	Overpelt	27
7	CH	Muralto	24

=== Heat 6 ===
Heat 6 was hosted by the BBC on 21 August 1974 in Northampton, United Kingdom, presented by Stuart Hall and Eddie Waring.

Place	Country	Town	Points
1	D	Kempten	44
2	CH	Muotathal	39
2	GB	Rugby	39
2	NL	Anloo	39
5	I	Gaeta	34
6	F	Lunéville	29
7	B	Angleur	22

=== Heat 7 ===
Heat 7 was hosted by ARD on 4 September 1974 in Bayreuth, West Germany, presented by Erhard Keller and Marie-Louise Steinbauer.

Place	Country	Town	Points
1	I	Marostica	44
2	D	Bayreuth	38
3	GB	Ripon	33
4	NL	Gendringen	32
5	CH	Carouge	30
6	B	Marchienne-au-Pont	28
7	F	Senlis	26

=== Qualifiers ===
The teams with the most points from each country advanced to the grand final:

Country	Town	Place won	Points won
D	Rosenheim	1	47
I	Marostica	1	44
F	Nancy	1	44
GB	Farnham	1	40
NL	Zandvoort	1	40
CH	Muotathal	2	39
B	Vilvoorde	3	34

== Final ==
The final was hosted by NCRV on 18 September 1974 on the grounds of the De Valk Windmill Museum in Leiden, Netherlands, presented by Dick Passchier, Barend Barendse and Dik Bikker.

Place	Country	Town	Points
1	CH	Muotathal	40
2	I	Marostica	39
3	F	Nancy	38
4	D	Rosenheim	36
5	B	Vilvoorde	30
5	GB	Farnham	30
7	NL	Zandvoort	25
