= Jeux sans frontières season 2 =

This is the detailed article of the 1966 season of Jeux sans Frontiéres

Jeux sans frontières
- Season 2
- No. of teams: 4 countries
- Winner: (West Germany) Eichstätt
- Runner-up: (Belgium) Jambes
- Head referees: Gennaro Olivieri; Guido Pancaldi
- No. of episodes: 13

Release
- Original network: RTB; Première Chaîne; Deutsches Fernsehen; Secondo Programma
- Original release: 1 June – 14 September 1966

Season chronology
- ← Previous; Season 1 Next → Season 3

The 2nd season of the international television game show Jeux sans frontières was held between 1 June and 14 September 1966. Broadcasters from Belgium, France, Italy, and West Germany participated in the competition coordinated by the European Broadcasting Union (EBU). Teams from towns from those four countries participated in a series of heats, with two cities being qualified for the international final. The team from Eichstätt, West Germany won the season, giving the country its first overall win.

This was the first season featuring Gennaro Olivieri and Guido Pancaldi as referees, a partnership that would last seventeen years until the first series' end in 1982.

== Overview ==
Jeux sans frontières ("Games Without Borders" in French) is an international television game show, based on the French programme Intervilles which was first broadcast in 1962. It was broadcast from 1965 to 1999 under the auspices of the European Broadcasting Union (EBU), which owned the format. In non-French-speaking countries, the show had alternative titles. It is also widely known as It's a Knockout, the title of the BBC's domestic version and national selection for the programme.

== Participating countries and teams ==
All countries who had participated in the previous season returned for a second consecutive year.

Country	Broadcaster	Code	Colour	Cities
Belgium	RTB	B	Yellow	Antoing
Belgium	RTB	B	Yellow	Ath
Belgium	RTB	B	Yellow	Huy
Belgium	RTB	B	Yellow	Jambes
Belgium	RTB	B	Yellow	Malmedy
France	ORTF	F	Green	Arcachon
France	ORTF	F	Green	Bagnères-de-Bigorre
France	ORTF	F	Green	Fougères
France	ORTF	F	Green	Malo-les-Bains
France	ORTF	F	Green	Menton
Italy	RAI	I	Dark Blue	Alassio
Italy	RAI	I	Dark Blue	Procida
Italy	RAI	I	Dark Blue	Montecatini Terme
Italy	RAI	I	Dark Blue	Tivoli
Italy	RAI	I	Dark Blue	Todi
West Germany	ARD	D	Red	Eichstätt
West Germany	ARD	D	Red	Eschwege im Werratal
West Germany	ARD	D	Red	Erkelenz
West Germany	ARD	D	Red	Glückstadt an der Elbe
West Germany	ARD	D	Red	Sennestadt

== Season overview ==
Teams from Belgium, France, Italy, and West Germany competed each week in head-to-head competition between two cities or towns from two of the four competing nations. There would be sports events, but also studio-based quizzes each week. Eventually, all teams would have competed against each other and the teams with the highest cumulative points for each nation from the series would meet in two semi-finals, with the two winners meeting in the final. The heats had 7 games per event, with the seventh game being the quiz game named "Game of Questions".

Heat	Date	Teams	Points
1	1 June	(France) Arcachon	7
1	1 June	(West Germany) Eschwege im Werratal	1
2	8 June	(Belgium) Antoing	13
2	8 June	(Italy) Tivoli	1
3	15 June	(Italy) Montecatini Terme	10
3	15 June	(France) Menton	-4
4	22 June	(Belgium) Ath	11
4	22 June	(West Germany) Erkelenz	7
5	29 June	(Belgium) Jambes	12
5	29 June	(France) Fougères	-4
6	6 July	(West Germany) Eichstätt	12
6	6 July	(Italy) Alassio	-4
7	3 August	(France) Bagnères-de-Bigorre	13
7	3 August	(West Germany) Glückstadt an der Elbe	4
8	10 August	(Italy) Todi	8
8	10 August	(Belgium) Malmedy	6
9	17 August	(France) Malo-les-Bains	10
9	17 August	(Italy) Procida	0
10	24 August	(West Germany) Sennestadt	10
10	24 August	(Belgium) Huy	8
International Semi-Finals
SF1	31 August	(Belgium) Jambes	8
SF1	31 August	(France) Malo-les-Bains	4
SF2	7 September	(West Germany) Eichstätt	12
SF2	7 September	(Italy) Montecatini Terme	10
International Final
F	14 September	(West Germany) Eichstätt	7
F	14 September	(Belgium) Jambes	5

== Heats ==
=== Heat 1 ===
Heat 1 was held on 1 June 1966. The neutral Swiss jury, composed of chairman Guy Ackermann (Geneva), Lilo Haussener (Zurich) and Mascia Cantoni (Lugano), was based in Paris, France. The broadcaster responsible for the transmission was ORTF.

Detailed scoreboard

Team	Country	Games										
Team	Country	1	2	3	4	5	6	GQ1	GQ1	GQ2	GQ2	Total
Eschwege im Werratal	D	0	2	2	0	0	1	–	-1	-3	–	7
Arcachon	F	2	0	0	2	2	1	-1	–	–	1	1

=== Heat 2 ===
Heat 2 was held on 8 June 1966. The neutral Swiss jury, composed of chairman Guy Ackermann (Geneva), Lilo Haussener (Zurich) and Marco Blaser (Lugano), was based in Zurich, Switzerland. The broadcaster responsible for the transmission was TV DRS on behalf of SRG SSR TSI.

Detailed scoreboard

Team	Country	Games										
Team	Country	1	2	3	4	5	6	GQ1	GQ1	GQ2	GQ2	Total
Antoing	B	2	2	2	2	1	2	1	–	–	1	13
Tivoli	I	0	0	0	0	1	0	–	-3	3	–	1

=== Heat 3 ===
Heat 3 was held on 15 June 1966. The neutral Swiss jury, composed of chairman Guy Ackermann (Geneva), Lilo Haussener (Zurich) and Joyce Pattacini (Lugano), was based in Milan, Italy. The broadcaster responsible for the transmission was RAI.

Detailed scoreboard

Team	Country	Games										
Team	Country	1	2	3	4	5	6	GQ1	GQ1	GQ2	GQ2	Total
Menton	F	0	2	-1	0	0	1	–	-3	-3	–	-4
Montecatini Terme	I	2	0	1	2	2	1	-1	–	–	1	10

=== Heat 4 ===
Heat 4 was held on 22 June 1966. The neutral Swiss jury, composed of chairman Guy Ackermann (Geneva), Lilo Haussener (Zurich) and Fausto Sassi (Lugano), was based in Cologne, West Germany. The broadcaster responsible for the transmission was ARD.

Detailed scoreboard

Team	Country	Games										
Team	Country	1	2	3	4	5	6	GQ1	GQ1	GQ2	GQ2	Total
Ath	B	2	0	0	0	1	2	–	3	3	–	11
Erkelenz	D	0	2	2	2	1	0	-1	–	–	1	7

=== Heat 5 ===
Heat 5 was held on 29 June 1966. The neutral Swiss jury, composed of chairman Georges Kleinmann (Geneva), Lilo Haussener (Zurich) and Dario Bertoni (Lugano), was based in Paris, France. The broadcaster responsible for the transmission was ORTF.

Detailed scoreboard

Team	Country	Games										
Team	Country	1	2	3	4	5	6	GQ1	GQ1	GQ2	GQ2	Total
Jambes	B	1	1	2	2	2	2	3	–	–	-1	12
Fougères	F	1	1	0	0	0	0	–	-3	-3	–	-4

=== Heat 6 ===
Heat 6 was held on 6 July 1966. The neutral Swiss jury, composed of chairman Guy Ackermann (Geneva), Lilo Haussener (Zurich) and Mascia Cantoni (Lugano), was based in Milan, Italy. The broadcaster responsible for the transmission was RAI.

Detailed scoreboard

Team	Country	Games										
Team	Country	1	2	3	4	5	6	GQ1	GQ1	GQ2	GQ2	Total
Eichstätt	D	2	2	2	2	0	2	1	–	–	1	12
Alassio	I	0	0	0	0	2	0	–	-3	-3	–	-4

=== Heat 7 ===
Heat 7 was held on 3 August 1966. The neutral Swiss jury, composed of chairman Georges Kleinmann (Geneva), Lilo Haussener (Zurich) and Mascia Cantoni (Lugano), was based in Brussels, Belgium. The broadcaster responsible for the transmission was RTB.

Detailed scoreboard

Team	Country	Games										
Team	Country	1	2	3	4	5	6	GQ1	GQ1	GQ2	GQ2	Total
Glückstadt an der Elbe	D	0	1	2	2	0	0	–	3	-3	–	5
Bagnères-de-Bigorre	F	2	1	0	0	2	2	3	–	–	3	13

=== Heat 8 ===
Heat 8 was held on 10 August 1966. The neutral Swiss jury, composed of chairman Georges Kleinmann (Geneva), Lilo Haussener (Zurich) and Mascia Cantoni (Lugano), was based in Zurich, Switzerland. The broadcaster responsible for the transmission was TV DRS on behalf of SRG SSR TSI.

Detailed scoreboard

Team	Country	Games										
Team	Country	1	2	3	4	5	6	GQ1	GQ1	GQ2	GQ2	Total
Malmedy	B	0	2	0	2	0	2	-3	–	–	3	6
Todi	I	2	0	2	0	2	0	–	1	1	–	8

=== Heat 9 ===
Heat 9 was held on 17 August 1966. The neutral Swiss jury, composed of chairman Georges Kleinmann (Geneva), Lilo Haussener (Zurich) and Mascia Cantoni (Lugano), was based in Milan, Italy. The broadcaster responsible for the transmission was RAI.

Detailed scoreboard

Team	Country	Games										
Team	Country	1	2	3	4	5	6	GQ1	GQ1	GQ2	GQ2	Total
Malo-les-Bains	F	1	2	2	1	0	0	3	–	–	1	10
Procida	I	1	0	0	1	2	2	–	-3	-3	–	0

=== Heat 10 ===
Heat 10 was held on 24 August 1966. The neutral Swiss jury, composed of chairman André Rosat (Geneva), Max Ernst (Zurich) and Fausto Sassi (Lugano), was based in Cologne, West Germany. The broadcaster responsible for the transmission was ARD.

Detailed scoreboard

Team	Country	Games										
Team	Country	1	2	3	4	5	6	GQ1	GQ1	GQ2	GQ2	Total
Huy	B	0	0	0	0	0	2	–	3	3	–	8
Sennestadt	D	2	2	2	2	2	0	1	–	–	-1	10

=== Qualified teams ===
The teams which qualified from each country to the final phase were:

Country	Team	Heat
Belgium	Jambes	5
France	Malo-les-Bains	9
Italy	Montecatini Terme	3
Germany	Eichstätt	6

== Finals ==
=== Bracket ===
Semi-finals
31 August
(Belgium) Jambes	8
(France) Malo-les-Bains	4
7 September
(West Germany) Eichstätt	12
(Italy) Montecatini Terme	10

Final
14 September
(Belgium) Jambes	5
(West Germany) Eichstätt	7

=== Semi-final 1 ===
Semi-final 1 was held on 31 August 1966. The neutral Swiss jury, composed of chairman André Rosat (Geneva), Lilo Haussener (Zurich) and Fausto Sassi (Lugano), was based in Paris, France. The broadcaster responsible for the transmission was ORTF.

Detailed scoreboard

Team	Country	Games										
Team	Country	1	2	3	4	5	6	GQ1	GQ1	GQ2	GQ2	Total
Jambes	B	2	0	2	2	2	0	-2	–	–	1	8
Malo-les-Bains	F	0	2	0	0	0	2	–	3	-3	–	4

=== Semi-final 2 ===
Semi-final 2 was held on 7 September 1966. The neutral jury was based in Zurich, Switzerland. The broadcaster responsible for the transmission was TV DRS on behalf of SRG SSR TSI.

Detailed scoreboard

Team	Country	Games										
Team	Country	1	2	3	4	5	6	GQ1	GQ1	GQ2	GQ2	Total
Eichstätt	D	Unknown										12
Montecatini Terme	I	Unknown										10

=== Grand Final ===
The grand final was held on 14 September 1966. The neutral Swiss jury, composed of chairman André Rosat (Geneva), Max Ernst (Zurich) and Fausto Sassi (Lugano), was based in Cologne, West Germany. The broadcaster responsible for the transmission was ARD.

Detailed scoreboard

Team	Country	Games										
Team	Country	1	2	3	4	5	6	GQ1	GQ1	GQ2	GQ2	Total
Jambes	B	0	0	2	1	2	0	–	-3	3	–	5
Eichstätt	D	2	2	0	1	0	2	-3	–	–	3	7

== Broadcasts ==
The competition was broadcast live from both competing towns to the participating broadcasters via the Eurovision network.

Broadcasters and commentators in participating countries
Country	Broadcaster(s)	Channel(s)	Presenter(s)/Commentator(s)	Ref.
Belgium	RTB	RTB	Paule Herreman; Jean-Claude Menessier	
France	ORTF	Première Chaîne	Simone Garnier; Guy Lux; Joseph Pasteur; Léon Zitrone	
West Germany	ARD	Deutsches Fernsehen	Tim Elstner; Camillo FelgenAlbert Raisner; Otto Ernst Rock	
Italy	RAI	Secondo Programma	Giulio Marchetti; Nunzio Filagamo; Enzo Tortora	

Broadcasters and commentators in non-participating countries
Country	Broadcaster	Channel(s)	Presenter(s)/Commentator(s)	Ref(s)
Austria	ORF	ORF		
Switzerland	SRG SSR TSI	TSI		
Switzerland	SRG SSR TSI	TSR	Paule Herreman	
Switzerland	SRG SSR TSI	TV DRS		
