= Jeux sans frontières season 12 =

Jeux sans frontières
- Season 12
- No. of teams: 7 countries
- Winner: (West Germany) Ettlingen
- Runner-up: (Switzerland) La Neuveville
- Head referees: Gennaro Olivieri; Guido Pancaldi
- No. of episodes: 8

Release
- Original release: 2 June – 22 September 1976

Season chronology
- ← Previous; Season 11 Next → Season 13

The 12th season of the international television game show Jeux sans frontières was held in the summer of 1976. Broadcasters from Belgium, France, Italy, the Netherlands, Switzerland, the United Kingdom, and West Germany participated in the competition coordinated by the European Broadcasting Union (EBU). The different heats were hosted by each of the participant broadcasters in locations in their countries such as Milan (Italy), Liège (Belgium), Bad Mergentheim (West Germany), Groningen (Netherlands), Nîmes (France), Caslano (Switzerland), and Leeds (United Kingdom). The grand final was held in Blackpool (United Kingdom). The head international referees in charge of supervising the competition were Gennaro Olivieri and Guido Pancaldi. The games were also reportedly broadcast in Latin American and Asian countries.

A team from Liechtenstein competed in one of the heats instead Switzerland. The season was won by the team from Ettlingen, West Germany, the runner-up being the team from La Neuveville, Switzerland.

== Participants ==
Country	Broadcaster	Code	Colour
Belgium	RTB / BRT	B	Yellow
France	Antenne 2	F	Purple
Italy	RAI	I	Blue
Netherlands	NCRV	NL	Orange
Switzerland	SRG SSR TSI	CH	Gold
Liechtenstein	No broadcaster	FL	Gold
United Kingdom	BBC	GB	Red
West Germany	ARD	D	Light blue

== Heats ==
=== Heat 1 ===
Heat 1 was hosted by Antenne 2 on 2 June 1976 on the Arena in Nîmes, France, presented by Guy Lux and Simone Garnier.

Place	Country	Town	Points
1	I	Jesolo	41
2	D	Trostberg	40
2	NL	Pijnacker	40
2	CH	Huttwil	40
5	F	Nîmes	37
6	GB	Blackpool	34
7	B	Blankenberge	26

=== Heat 2 ===
Heat 2 was hosted by RAI on 16 June 1976 at the Palasport di San Siro in Milan, Italy, presented by Giulio Marchetti and Rosanna Vaudetti.

Place	Country	Town	Points
1	CH	Roche	37
2	D	Lippstadt	36
2	NL	Weert	36
4	B	Schaerbeek	34
5	F	Toulon	29
6	I	Bollate	26
6	GB	Tamworth	26

=== Heat 3 ===
Heat 3 was hosted by TSI on behalf of SRG SSR TSI on 23 June 1976 in Caslano, Switzerland, presented by Mascia Cantoni and Ezio Guidi.

Place	Country	Town	Points
1	GB	Newbury	46
2	CH	Caslano	43
3	F	Arbois	36
4	I	Amalfi	33
5	D	Birkenfeld	32
6	B	Wezembeek-Oppem	31
7	NL	Zutphen	24

=== Heat 4 ===
Heat 4 was hosted by the BBC on 14 July 1976 at Roundhay Park in Leeds, United Kingdom, presented by Stuart Hall and Eddie Waring.

Place	Country	Town	Points
1	GB	Kirklees	45
2	D	Traunstein	41
3	NL	Oldekerk	38
4	CH	Füllinsdorf	32
5	F	Villefranche-sur-Saône	25
7	B	Tournai	24
6	I	Riva del Garda	23

=== Heat 5 ===
Heat 5 was hosted by RTB on 11 August 1976 in Liège, Belgium, presented by Paule Herreman and Michel Lemaire.

Place	Country	Town	Points
1	CH	La Neuveville	45
2	NL	Hilvarenbeek	40
3	B	Liège	36
4	D	Bad Füssing	33
5	F	Agen	31
6	GB	Thurrock	30
7	I	Perugia	22

=== Heat 6 ===
Heat 6 was hosted by ARD on 25 August 1976 at the inner courtyard of the Deutschordenschloß in Bad Mergentheim, West Germany, presented by Erhard Keller and Manfred Erdenberger.

Place	Country	Town	Points
1	B	Geel	46
2	D	Alsfeld	45
3	GB	Redcar	34
4	CH	Brissago	31
5	F	Douai	29
6	I	Milazzo	25
7	NL	Valkenisse	24

=== Heat 7 ===
Heat 7 was hosted by NCRV on 8 September 1976 at Stadspark in Groningen, Netherlands, presented by Dick Passchier and Barend Barendse.

Place	Country	Town	Points
1	D	Ettlingen	42
2	GB	Edinburgh	37
3	NL	Groningen	35
4	FL	Liechtenstein	34
5	F	Saint-Gaudens	32
6	B	Aalter	29
7	I	Silvi Marina	21

=== Qualifiers ===
The teams with the most points from each country advanced to the grand final:

Country	Town	Place won	Points won
GB	Newbury	1	46
B	Geel	1	46
CH	La Neuveville	1	45
D	Ettlingen	1	42
I	Jesolo	1	41
NL	Hilvarenbeek	2	40
F	Arbois	3	36

== Final ==
The final was hosted by the BBC on 22 September 1976 in Blackpool, United Kingdom, presented by Stuart Hall and Eddie Waring.

Place	Country	Town	Points
1	D	Ettlingen	52
2	CH	La Neuveville	41
3	B	Geel	40
4	F	Arbois	33
5	GB	Newbury	27
6	NL	Hilvarenbeek	21
7	I	Jesolo	18
