= Jeux sans frontières season 13 =

Jeux sans frontières
- Season 13
- No. of teams: 7 countries
- Winner: (West Germany) Schliersee
- Runner-up: (Belgium) Uccle
- Head referees: Gennaro Olivieri; Guido Pancaldi
- No. of episodes: 8

Release
- Original release: 1 June – 7 September 1977

Season chronology
- ← Previous; Season 12 Next → Season 14

The 13th season of the international television game show Jeux sans frontières was held in the summer of 1977. Broadcasters from Belgium, France, Italy, the Netherlands, Switzerland, the United Kingdom, and West Germany participated in the competition coordinated by the European Broadcasting Union (EBU). The different heats were hosted by each of the participant broadcasters in locations in their countries such as Marina di Carrara (Italy), Antwerp (Belgium), Ludwigsburg (West Germany), Doetinchem (Netherlands), Évry (France), Carouge (Switzerland), and Windsor (United Kingdom). The grand final was held in Ludwigsburg (West Germany). The head international referees in charge of supervising the competition were Gennaro Olivieri and Guido Pancaldi.

The season of was won by the team from Schliersee, West Germany, the runner-up being the team from Uccle, Belgium.

== Participants ==
Country	Broadcaster	Code	Colour
Belgium	RTBF / BRT	B	Yellow
France	Antenne 2	F	Green
Italy	RAI	I	Blue
Netherlands	NCRV	NL	Orange
Switzerland	SRG SSR TSI	CH	Gold
United Kingdom	BBC	GB	Red
West Germany	ARD	D	Light blue

== Heats ==
=== Heat 1 ===
Heat 1 was hosted by RAI on 1 June 1977 in Marina di Carrara, Italy, presented by Giulio Marchetti and Rosanna Vaudetti.

Place	Country	Town	Points
1	I	Marina di Carrara	50
2	D	Schliersee	38
3	NL	Dalfsen	31
4	CH	Freienbach	30
4	B	Alken	30
6	GB	Beverley	29
7	F	Ambarès	19

=== Heat 2 ===
Heat 2 was hosted by Antenne 2 on 15 June 1977 at the Safari de Saint-Vrain in Évry, France, presented by Guy Lux and Simone Garnier.

Place	Country	Town	Points
1	CH	Olivone	40
2	GB	Oldham	37
3	B	Frameries	35
4	D	Dahn	34
5	F	Évry	33
6	I	Solofra	32
7	NL	Buren	27

=== Heat 3 ===
Heat 3 was hosted by TSR on behalf of SRG SSR TSI on 29 June 1977 in Carouge, Switzerland, presented by Georges Kleinmann and Jacques Huwiler.

Place	Country	Town	Points
1	NL	Nieuwegein	47
2	I	Moena	38
3	D	Schwäbisch Gmünd	36
4	B	Zwevegem	32
4	F	Blanzac	32
6	CH	Carouge	20
7	GB	Macclesfield	19

=== Heat 4 ===
Heat 4 was hosted by ARD on 13 July 1977 at the Marktplatz in Ludwigsburg, West Germany, presented by Erhard Keller and Manfred Erdenberger.

Place	Country	Town	Points
1	NL	Gilze en Rijen	40
1	F	Fontainebleau	40
3	CH	Zurzach	38
4	B	Spa	34
5	GB	Cwmbran	32
5	D	Ludwigsburg	32
7	I	Lagonegro	23

=== Heat 5 ===
Heat 5 was hosted by the BBC on 26 July 1977 at Home Park in Windsor, United Kingdom, presented by Stuart Hall and Eddie Waring.

Place	Country	Town	Points
1	B	Uccle	43
2	NL	Landsmeer	40
2	F	Toulon	40
4	GB	Windsor and Maidenhead	38
5	CH	Tesserete	31
6	D	Bebra	30
7	I	Gubbio	14

=== Heat 6 ===
Heat 6 was hosted by BRT on 10 August 1977 at the Grote Markt in Antwerp, Belgium, presented by Mike Verdrengh and Ann Michel.

Place	Country	Town	Points
1	NL	Ooststellingwerf	41
2	B	Antwerp	38
3	D	Seelze	36
4	I	Vignola	35
5	GB	Southend-on-Sea	27
6	F	Quimper	26
7	CH	Sion	20

=== Heat 7 ===
Heat 7 was hosted by NCRV on 24 August 1977 in Doetinchem, Netherlands, presented by Dick Passchier and Barend Barendse.

Place	Country	Town	Points
1	F	Bourgoin-Jallieu	43
2	NL	Doetinchem	40
3	CH	Scuol	39
4	GB	Crawley	36
5	B	Kelmis	26
5	D	Limburg	26
7	I	Viterbo	22

=== Qualifiers ===
The teams with the most points from each country advanced to the grand final:

Country	Town	Place won	Points won
I	Marina di Carrara	1	50
NL	Nieuwegein	1	47
B	Uccle	1	43
F	Bourgoin-Jallieu	1	43
CH	Olivone	1	40
D	Schliersee	2	38
GB	Oldham	2	37

== Final ==
The final was hosted by ARD on 7 September 1977 at the grounds of the Residenzschloß in Ludwigsburg, West Germany.

Place	Country	Town	Points
1	D	Schliersee	47
2	B	Uccle	36
3	CH	Olivone	35
4	F	Bourgoin-Jallieu	32
4	GB	Oldham	32
6	NL	Nieuwegein	31
7	I	Marina di Carrara	27
