= Jeux sans frontières season 14 =

Jeux sans frontières
- Season 14
- No. of teams: 7 countries
- Winner: (Italy) Abano Terme
- Runner-up: (United Kingdom) Sandwell
- Head referees: Gennaro Olivieri; Guido Pancaldi
- No. of episodes: 8

Release
- Original release: 31 May – 6 September 1978

Season chronology
- ← Previous; Season 13 Next → Season 15

The 14th season of the international television game show Jeux sans frontières was held in the summer of 1978. Broadcasters from Belgium, France, Italy, Switzerland, the United Kingdom, West Germany, and, for the first time, Yugoslavia participated in the competition coordinated by the European Broadcasting Union (EBU), while the Netherlands withdrew due to their broadcaster showing the heats on a delayed basis, and many of its viewers were watching them live on Belgian television. The different heats were hosted by each of the participant broadcasters in locations in their countries such as Verbania (Italy), Rochefort (Belgium), Grömitz (West Germany), Zemun (Yugoslavia), Bourgoin-Jallieu (France), Arosa (Switzerland), and Lincoln (United Kingdom). The grand final was held in Montecatini Terme (Italy). The head international referees in charge of supervising the competition were Gennaro Olivieri and Guido Pancaldi.

The season was won by the team from Abano Terme, Italy, the runner-up being the team from Sandwell, United Kingdom.

== Participants ==
Country	Broadcaster	Code	Colour
Belgium	RTBF / BRT	B	Yellow
France	Antenne 2	F	Green
Italy	RAI	I	Blue
Switzerland	SRG SSR TSI	CH	Gold
United Kingdom (designated as Northern Ireland in Heat 3)	BBC	GB (NI in Heat 3)	Red
West Germany	ARD	D	Light blue
Yugoslavia	JRT	YU	White and blue

== Heat ==
=== Heat 1 ===
Heat 1 was hosted by RAI on 31 May 1978 in Verbania, Italy, presented by Ettore Andenna and Milly Carlucci.

Place	Country	Town	Points
1	CH	Bad Ragaz	41
2	I	Verbania	39
3	D	Friedrichsthal	37
3	GB	Bath	37
5	YU	Split	36
6	B	Dilbeek	33
7	F	Meudon	22

=== Heat 2 ===
Heat 2 was hosted by RTBF on 13 June 1978 in Rochefort, Belgium, presented by Paule Herreman and Michel Lemaire.

Place	Country	Town	Points
1	D	Sobernheim	44
2	B	Rochefort	39
3	I	Abano Terme	39
4	CH	Yverdon	34
5	GB	Crewe and Nantwich	32
6	YU	Novo Mesto	27
7	F	La Rochelle	25

=== Heat 3 ===
Heat 3 was hosted by ARD on 28 June 1978 in Grömitz, West Germany, presented by Manfred Erdenberger and Brigitte März.

Place	Country	Town	Points
1	B	Willebroek	43
2	F	Cambrai	37
3	NI	Derry	35
4	D	Grömitz	32
5	I	Battipaglia	31
6	YU	Mostar	28
7	CH	Cavergno	27

=== Heat 4 ===
Heat 4 was hosted by TV Belgrade on behalf of JRT on 12 July 1978 in Zemun, Yugoslavia, presented by Dunja Lango, Dragan Nikitović and Minja Subota.

Place	Country	Town	Points
1	GB	Sandwell	48
2	F	Fontainebleau	44
3	CH	Altdorf	36
4	B	Silly	33
4	YU	Zemun	33
6	D	Lahnstein	25
7	I	Tolfa	20

=== Heat 5 ===
Heat 5 was hosted by Antenne 2 on 26 July 1978 in Bourgoin-Jallieu , France, presented by Guy Lux and Simone Garnier.

Place	Country	Town	Points
1	GB	East Kilbride	46
2	CH	Novazzano	38
3	B	Hamme	37
4	D	Wesseling	36
4	F	Bourgoin-Jallieu	36
6	YU	Ohrid	22
7	I	Montecatini Terme	21

=== Heat 6 ===
Heat 6 was hosted by TV DRS on behalf of SRG SSR TSI on 9 August 1978 in Arosa, Switzerland, presented by Jan Hiermeyer and Rosemarie Pfluger.

Place	Country	Town	Points
1	CH	Arosa	44
2	GB	Stevenage	42
3	D	Drolshagen	36
4	F	Arette-la-Pierre-Saint Martin	35
5	I	Pescasseroli	34
6	B	Ottignies-Louvain-la-Neuve	22
7	YU	Kotor	21

=== Heat 7 ===
Heat 7 was hosted by the BBC on 23 August 1978 in Lincoln, United Kingdom, presented by Stuart Hall and Eddie Waring.

Place	Country	Town	Points
1	B	Hasselt	37
1	YU	Kragujevac	37
3	D	Telgte	36
3	F	Mandelieu	36
5	CH	Tramelan	35
6	GB	Cleethorpes	29
7	I	Pianoro	24

=== Qualifiers ===
The teams with the most points from each country advanced to the grand final:

Country	Town	Place won	Points won
GB	Sandwell	1	48
CH	Arosa	1	44
D	Sobernheim	1	44
B	Willebroek	1	43
YU	Kragujevac	1	37
F	Fontainebleau	2	44
I	Abano Terme	2	39

== Final ==
The final was hosted by RAI on 6 September 1978 in Montecatini Terme, Italy, presented by Ettore Andenna and Milly Carlucci.

Place	Country	Town	Points
1	I	Abano Terme	43
2	GB	Sandwell	41
3	F	Fontainebleau	36
4	CH	Arosa	31
4	YU	Kragujevac	31
6	B	Willebroek	28
7	D	Sobernheim	25
