= Jeux sans frontières season 11 =

Jeux sans frontières
- Season 11
- No. of teams: 7 countries
- Winner: (France) Nancy
- Runner-up: (Italy) Riccione
- Head referees: Gennaro Olivieri; Guido Pancaldi
- No. of episodes: 8

Release
- Original release: 20 May – 26 August 1975

Season chronology
- ← Previous; Season 10 Next → Season 12

The 11th season of the international television game show Jeux sans frontières was held in the summer of 1975. Broadcasters from Belgium, France, Italy, the Netherlands, Switzerland, the United Kingdom, and West Germany participated in the competition coordinated by the European Broadcasting Union (EBU). The different heats were hosted by each of the participant broadcasters in locations in their countries such as Riccione (Italy), Knokke-Heist (Belgium), Mannheim (West Germany), Maastricht (Netherlands), Nancy (France), Engelberg (Switzerland), and Southport (United Kingdom). The grand final was held in Ypres (Belgium). The head international referees in charge of supervising the competition were Gennaro Olivieri and Guido Pancaldi.

The season was won by the team from Nancy, France, the runner-up being the team from Riccione, Italy.

== Participants ==
Country	Broadcaster	Code	Colour
Belgium	RTB / BRT	B	Yellow
France	Antenne 2	F	Purple
Italy	RAI	I	Blue
Netherlands	NCRV	NL	Orange
Switzerland	SRG SSR TSI	CH	Gold
United Kingdom	BBC	GB	Red
West Germany	ARD	D	Light blue

== Heats ==
=== Heat 1 ===
Heat 1 was hosted by BRT on 20 May 1975 in Knokke-Heist, Belgium, presented by Mike Verdrengh and Marc Van Poucke.

Place	Country	Town	Points
1	D	Oppenheim	43
2	B	Knokke-Heist	40
3	NL	Hoogvliet	39
4	F	Neuilly-sur-Seine	35
5	CH	Riva San Vitale	32
6	GB	St. Ives	29
7	I	Cosenza	23

=== Heat 2 ===
Heat 2 was hosted by NCRV on 3 June 1975 in Maastricht, Netherlands, presented by Dick Passchier and Barend Barendse.

Place	Country	Town	Points
1	D	Bietigheim-Bissingen	46
2	GB	Swansea	40
3	CH	Zermatt	37
4	I	Bracciano	33
5	B	Rochefort	29
6	F	Narbonne	26
6	NL	Maastricht	26

=== Heat 3 ===
Heat 3 was hosted by RAI on 17 June 1975 in Riccione, Italy, presented by Giulio Marchetti and Rosanna Vaudetti.

Place	Country	Town	Points
1	I	Riccione	42
2	CH	Le Mouret	41
3	F	Saint-Laurent-sur-Sèvre	36
4	NL	Zwijndrecht	35
5	B	Mol	32
6	D	Attendorn	31
7	GB	Onchan	25

=== Heat 4 ===
Heat 4 was hosted by TV DRS on behalf of SRG SSR TSI on 1 July 1975 in Engelberg, Switzerland, presented by Jan Hiermeyer and Heidi Abel.

Place	Country	Town	Points
1	D	Leonberg	41
2	F	Chartres	38
3	I	Aosta	36
3	CH	Giswil	36
5	GB	Darlington	34
6	NL	Veldhoven	30
7	B	Pepinster	29

=== Heat 5 ===
Heat 5 was hosted by ARD on 15 July 1975 in Mannheim, West Germany, presented by Erhard Keller and Marie-Louise Steinbauer.

Place	Country	Town	Points
1	CH	Faido	46
2	NL	Montfoort	41
3	D	Füssen	34
3	F	Aix-les-Bains	34
5	B	Temse	31
6	GB	Kilmarnock	30
7	I	Bosa	18

=== Heat 6 ===
Heat 6 was hosted by Antenne 2 on 29 July 1975 in Nancy, France, presented by Guy Lux and Simone Garnier.

Place	Country	Town	Points
1	F	Nancy	48
2	NL	Bedum	41
3	CH	Adliswil	38
4	D	Simmern	36
5	GB	Southsea	28
6	I	Bordighera	25
7	B	Houdeng-Aimeries	19

=== Heat 7 ===
Heat 7 was hosted by the BBC on 12 August 1975 in Southport, United Kingdom, presented by Stuart Hall and Eddie Waring.

Place	Country	Town	Points
1	NL	Steenwijk	38
2	B	Waterloo	36
3	I	Valmadrera	35
4	D	Baesweiler	30
4	CH	Sainte-Croix	30
6	GB	Cambridge	29
7	F	Saint-Gaudens	24

=== Qualifiers ===
The teams with the most points from each country advanced to the grand final:

Country	Town	Place won	Points won
F	Nancy	1	48
CH	Faido	1	46
D	Bietigheim-Bissingen	1	46
I	Riccione	1	42
B	Knokke-Heist	2	40
GB	Swansea	2	40
NL	Steenwijk	1	38

== Final ==
The final was hosted by BRT on 26 August 1975 in Ypres, Belgium, presented by Mike Verdrengh and Regine Clauwaert.

Place	Country	Town	Points
1	F	Nancy	45
2	I	Riccione	40
3	B	Knokke-Heist	34
4	D	Bietigheim-Bissingen	32
4	NL	Steenwijk	32
6	GB	Swansea	30
7	CH	Faido	28
