= Jeux sans frontières season 9 =

Jeux sans frontières
- Season 9
- No. of teams: 7 countries
- Winner: (United Kingdom) Ely
- Runner-up: (West Germany) Marburg an der Lahn
- Head referees: Gennaro Olivieri; Guido Pancaldi
- No. of episodes: 8

Release
- Original release: 6 June – 12 September 1973

Season chronology
- ← Previous; Season 8 Next → Season 10

The 9th season of the international television game show Jeux sans frontières was held in the summer of 1973. Broadcasters from Belgium, France, Italy, the Netherlands, Switzerland, the United Kingdom, and West Germany participated in the competition coordinated by the European Broadcasting Union (EBU). The different heats were hosted by each of the participant broadcasters in locations in their countries such as Senigallia (Italy), Blankenberge (Belgium), Heiligenhafen (West Germany), Arnhem (Netherlands), Chartres (France), Avenches (Switzerland), and Bristol (United Kingdom). The grand final was held in Paris (France). The head international referees in charge of supervising the competition were Gennaro Olivieri and Guido Pancaldi.

The season was won by the team from Ely, United Kingdom, the runner-up being the team from Marburg an der Lahn, West Germany.

== Participants ==
Country	Broadcaster	Code	Colour
Belgium	RTB / BRT	B	Yellow
France	ORTF	F	Purple
Italy	RAI	I	Blue
Netherlands	NCRV	NL	Orange
Switzerland	SRG SSR TSI	CH	Gold
United Kingdom	BBC	GB	Red
West Germany	ARD	D	Light blue

== Heats ==
=== Heat 1 ===
Heat 1 was hosted by RAI on 6 June 1973 in Senigallia, Italy, presented by Giulio Marchetti and Rosanna Vaudetti.

Place	Country	Town	Points
1	NL	Raalte	43
2	I	Senigallia	37
3	CH	Fontainemelon	36
4	GB	Bicester	31
5	B	Seraing	29
6	D	Alzey	26
7	F	Moëlan-sur-Mer	23

=== Heat 2 ===
Heat 2 was hosted by TSI on behalf of SRG SSR TSI on 20 June 1973 in Bellinzona, Switzerland, presented by Mascia Cantoni and Ezio Guidi.

Place	Country	Town	Points
1	NL	Hoogeveen	45
2	GB	Manchester	44
3	B	Herentals	35
4	D	Ansbach	32
5	I	Matera	31
6	CH	Bellinzona	28
7	F	Bagnères-de-Bigorre	23

=== Heat 3 ===
Heat 3 was hosted by ORTF on 4 July 1973 at the cloister of the cathedral in Chartres, France, presented by Guy Lux and Simone Garnier.

Place	Country	Town	Points
1	B	Ieper	42
2	F	Chartres	40
3	CH	Engelberg	36
4	I	Cantù	35
5	NL	Zandvoort	33
6	GB	Peebles	30
7	D	Hof	29

=== Heat 4 ===
Heat 4 was hosted by NCRV on 18 July 1973 in Arnhem, Netherlands, presented by Barend Barendse and Dick Passchier.

Place	Country	Town	Points
1	GB	Ely	41
2	CH	Châtillon	38
2	D	Meinerzhagen	38
4	NL	Ten Boer	37
5	I	San Vito al Tagliamento	36
6	B	Arlon	30
7	F	Guingamp	28

=== Heat 5 ===
Heat 5 was hosted by the BBC on 1 August 1973 at Durdham Down in Bristol, United Kingdom, presented by Stuart Hall and Eddie Waring.

Place	Country	Town	Points
1	D	Marburg an der Lahn	47
2	F	Cognac	38
3	GB	Blyth	37
4	B	Koekelberg	33
5	CH	Sargans	29
6	NL	Kapelle	26
7	I	Chieri	18

=== Heat 6 ===
Heat 6 was hosted by BRT on 15 August 1973 in Blankenberge, Belgium, presented by Jan Theys and Willy Delabastita.

Place	Country	Town	Points
1	D	Werl	43
2	NL	Geleen	39
3	B	Blankenberge	38
4	I	Battipaglia	32
5	GB	Ashington	31
5	CH	Balerna	31
7	F	Bourg-en-Bresse	26

=== Heat 7 ===
Heat 7 was hosted by ARD on 29 August 1973 in Heiligenhafen, West Germany, presented by Camillo Felgen and Erhard Keller.

Place	Country	Town	Points
1	NL	Heusden-Altena	47
2	D	Heiligenhafen	37
3	F	Vittel	35
4	CH	Grenchen	33
4	GB	Wells	33
6	I	Foligno	28
7	B	Dottignies	24

=== Qualifiers ===
The teams with the most points from each country advanced to the grand final:

Country	Town	Place won	Points won
D	Marburg an der Lahn	1	47
NL	Heusden-Altena	1	47
B	Ieper	1	42
GB	Ely	1	41
F	Chartres	2	40
CH	Châtillon	2	38
I	Senigallia	2	37

== Final ==
The final was hosted by ORTF on 12 September 1973 in Paris, France, presented by Guy Lux and Simone Garnier.

Place	Country	Town	Points
1	GB	Ely	43
2	D	Marburg an der Lahn	41
3	F	Chartres	39
4	I	Senigallia	36
5	B	Ieper	32
6	CH	Châtillon	26
7	NL	Heusden-Altena	24
