= Jeux sans frontières season 1 =

First edition of the European television game show Jeux sans frontières

Jeux sans frontières
- Season 1
- No. of teams: 4 countries
- Winners: Ciney, Belgium; Saint-Amand-les-Eaux, France
- No. of episodes: 9

Release
- Original network: RTB; Première Chaîne; Secondo Programma; Deutsches Fernsehen
- Original release: 26 May – 15 September 1965

Season chronology
- Next → Season 2

The first season of the international television game show Jeux sans frontières was held in summer 1965. Broadcasters from Belgium, France, Italy, and West Germany participated in the competition coordinated by the European Broadcasting Union (EBU). The competition featured teams from towns from those countries competing against each other two by two, broadcast live from both competing towns, to all the participating broadcasters via the Eurovision network, with the broadcaster of the neutral jury's location serving as the broadcaster responsible for transmission. The winners of this edition were the cities of Ciney, Belgium, and Saint-Amand-les-Eaux, France.

== Overview ==
Jeux sans frontières ("Games Without Borders" in French) is an international television game show, based on the French programme Intervilles which was first broadcast in 1962. It was broadcast from 1965 to 1999 under the auspices of the European Broadcasting Union (EBU), which owned the format. In non-French-speaking countries, the show had alternative titles. It is also widely known as It's a Knockout, the title of the BBC's domestic version and national selection for the programme. The idea of the show came from French President Charles de Gaulle, whose wish was that French and German youth would meet in a series of games to reinforce the friendship between the two countries.

=== Format ===
In its original conception, teams from Belgium, France, West Germany, and Italy competed each week in head-to-head competition between two cities or towns from two of the four competing countries. There would be sports events, but also studio-based quizzes each week. Eventually, all teams would have competed against each other and the teams with the highest cumulative points for each nation from the series would meet in two semi-finals, with the two winners meeting in the final.

== Participants ==
Country	Broadcaster	Code	Colour	Cities
Belgium	RTB	B	Yellow	Binche
Belgium	RTB	B	Yellow	Stavelot
Belgium	RTB	B	Yellow	Ciney
France	ORTF	F	Green	Dax
France	ORTF	F	Green	Orange
France	ORTF	F	Green	Saint-Amand-les-Eaux
Italy	RAI	I	Dark Blue	Camogli
Italy	RAI	I	Dark Blue	Orvieto
Italy	RAI	I	Dark Blue	Ischia
West Germany	ARD	D	Red	Warendorf
West Germany	ARD	D	Red	Siegburg
West Germany	ARD	D	Red	Lemgo

== Heats ==
=== Heat 1 ===
Heat 1 was hosted on 26 May 1965. The neutral jury, composed of chairman Pierre Brive, André Rosat (Geneva), Lilo Haussener (Zurich) and Mascia Cantoni (Lugano), was based in Paris, France. The broadcaster responsible for the transmission was ORTF.

Place	Country	Town	Points
1	D	Warendorf	4
2	F	Dax	0

=== Heat 2 ===
Heat 2 was hosted on 9 June 1965. The neutral jury, composed of chairman Georges Kleinmann, Claude Évelyne (Geneva), Max Ernst (Zurich) and Grytzko Mascioni (Lugano), was based in Milan, Italy. The broadcaster responsible for the transmission was RAI.

Place	Country	Town	Points
1	F	Orange	7
2	I	Camogli	5

=== Heat 3 ===
Heat 3 was hosted on 23 June 1965. The neutral jury, composed of chairman Joseph Pasteur, André Rosat (Geneva), Lilo Haussener (Zurich) and Marco Blaser (Lugano), was based in Cologne, West Germany. The broadcaster responsible for the transmission was ARD.

Place	Country	Town	Points
1	B	Binche	4
2	D	Siegburg	4

=== Heat 4 ===
Heat 4 was hosted on 7 July 1965. The neutral jury, composed of chairman André Rosat (Geneva), Lilo Haussener (Zurich) and Mascia Cantoni (Lugano), was based in Paris, France. The broadcaster responsible for the transmission was ORTF.

Place	Country	Town	Points
1	F	Saint-Amand-les-Eaux	4
2	B	Stavelot	-2

=== Heat 5 ===
Heat 5 was hosted on 21 July 1965. The neutral jury, composed of chairman André Rosat (Geneva), Lilo Haussener (Zurich) and Dario Robbiani (Lugano), was based in Zurich, Switzerland. The broadcaster responsible for the transmission was TV DRS on behalf of SRG SSR TSI.

Place	Country	Town	Points
1	I	Orvieto	10
2	D	Lemgo	4

=== Heat 6 ===
Heat 6 was hosted on 4 August 1965. The neutral jury, composed of chairman André Rosat (Geneva), Lilo Haussener (Zurich) and Fausto Sassi (Lugano), was based in Zurich, Switzerland. The broadcaster responsible for the transmission was TV DRS on behalf SRG SSR TSI.

Place	Country	Town	Points
1	B	Ciney	6
2	I	Ischia	4

== Semi-finals ==
=== Semi-final 1 ===
Semi-final 1 was hosted on 18 August 1965. The neutral jury, composed of chairman André Rosat (Geneva), Lilo Haussener (Zurich) and Maria Maddalena Yon (Lugano), was based in Cologne, West Germany. The broadcaster responsible for the transmission was ARD.

Place	Country	Town	Points
1	B	Ciney	13
2	D	Warendorf	13

=== Semi-final 2 ===
Semi-final 2 was hosted on 1 September 1965. The neutral jury, composed of chairman André Rosat (Geneva), Max Ernst (Zurich) and Mascia Cantoni (Lugano), was based in Paris, France. The broadcaster responsible for the transmission was ORTF.

Place	Country	Town	Points
1	F	Saint-Amand-les-Eaux	7
2	I	Orvieto	5

== Final ==
The final was hosted on 15 September 1965. The neutral jury, composed of chairman André Rosat (Geneva), Lilo Haussener (Zurich) and Mascia Cantoni (Lugano), was based in Paris, France. The broadcaster responsible for the transmission was ORTF.

Place	Country	Town	Points
1	B	Ciney	11
1	F	Saint-Amand-les-Eaux	11

== Broadcasts ==
The competition was broadcast live from both competing towns to the participating broadcasters via the Eurovision network, with the broadcaster of the neutral jury's location serving as the broadcaster responsible for transmission.

Broadcasters and commentators in participating countries
Country	Broadcaster(s)	Channel(s)	Presenter(s)/Commentator(s)	Ref.
Belgium	RTB	RTB	Pierre Brive, Paule Herreman and Jean-Claude Menessier	
France	ORTF	Première Chaîne	Simone Garnier, Yvonne Kasawicz, Guy Lux, Joseph Pasteur and Léon Zitrone	
Italy	RAI	Secondo Programma	Lea Landi, Giulio Marchetti and Enzo Tortora	
West Germany	ARD	Deutsches Fernsehen	Arnim Dahl, Camillo Felgen, Ernst-Ludwig Freisewinkel, Lilo Katzke, Albert Raisner and Otto Ernst Rock	

Broadcasters and commentators in non-participating countries
Country	Broadcaster	Channel(s)	Presenter(s)/Commentator(s)	Ref(s)
Switzerland	SRG SSR TSI	TSR	Georges Kleinmann	
Switzerland	SRG SSR TSI	TV DRS	Ernst-Ludwig Freisewinkel	
