= Le Jeu des 1000 euros =

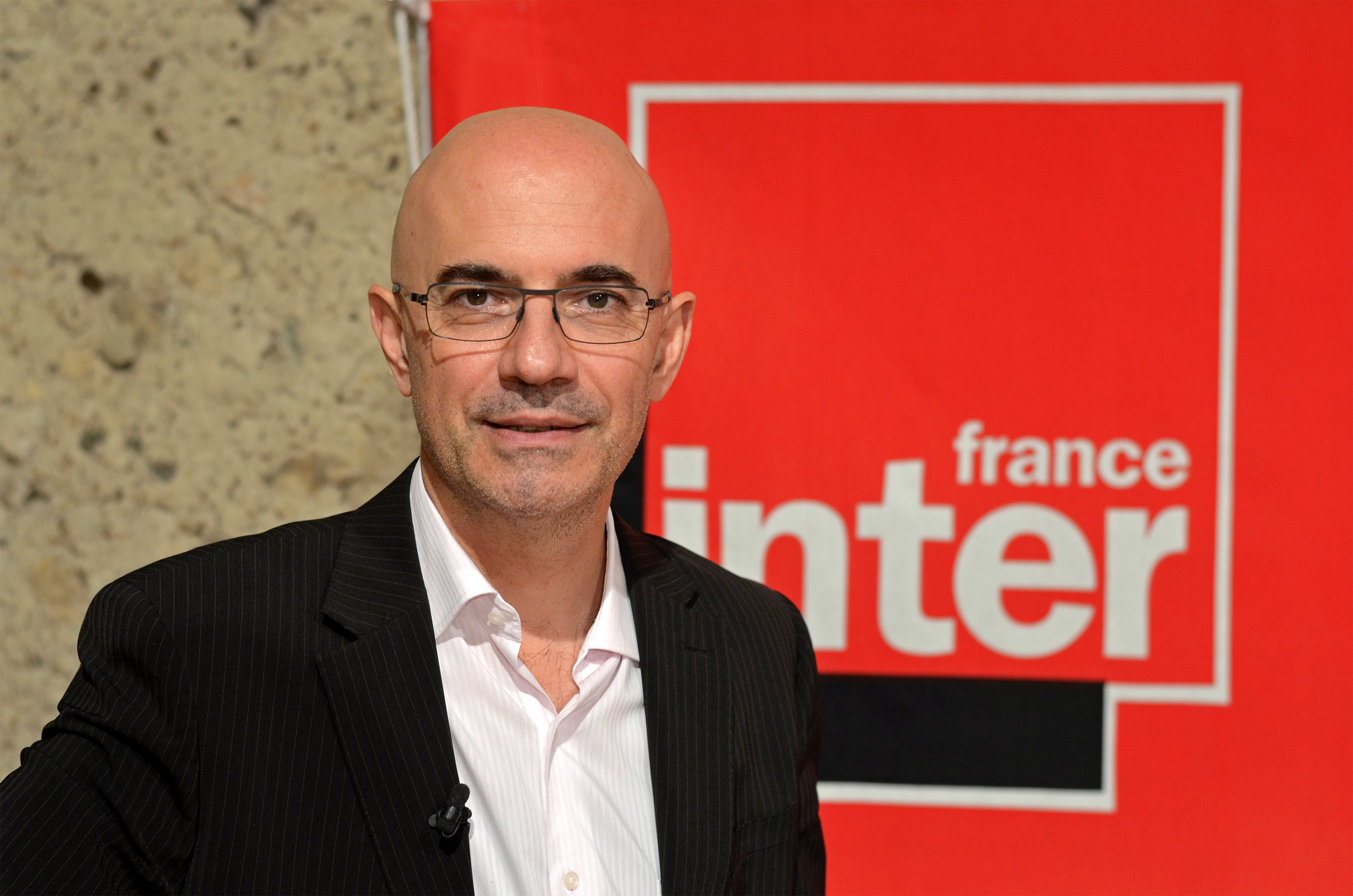
- Nicolas Stoufflet at Couture-sur-Loir (Loir-et-Cher)
- Genre: General-knowledge quiz show
- Running time: Monday - Friday; 12:45 PM UTC+1 to 1:00 PM UTC+1
- Country of origin: France
- Language: French
- Home station: France Inter
- Hosted by: Nicolas Stoufflet
- Recording studio: Varies
- Original release: April 19, 1958 – present
- Website: franceinter.fr/emissions/le-jeu-des-1000-euros

Le Jeu des 1000 euros (The 1000 Euros Game) is a French daily radio game show broadcast on France Inter. Created in 1958 by Henri Kubnick under the name 100 000 francs par jour (100,000 Francs Per Day), it is the longest-running program on French radio.

Because of the change of the French currency value over the years, it was renamed multiple times before taking its present name. It has been hosted by Henri Kubnick, Albert Raisner, Maurice Gardett, Roger Lanzac, Pierre Le Rouzic, Lucien Jeunesse for 30 years from 1965 to 1995, Louis Bozon from September 1995 to June 2008, and is currently being hosted by Nicolas Stoufflet.

== Overview ==
The show travels throughout the year to towns all around France, usually once a week. The show has also travelled to the United States, Portugal, Guadeloupe, Martinique, Réunion, on the aircraft carrier Clemenceau, on MV Massalia, and in a submarine. The show is recorded, then broadcast a few days later in several stages.

=== Blue, white, and red questions ===
Contestants draw six questions in three colors, (blue, white, and red) to answer: three blue questions, two white questions, and one red question. The questions are written by listeners, and ranked by difficulty by the production team. For each question, the contestants are allowed to provide multiple answers for up to 30 seconds. Questions that are not answered correctly are then rephrased, but only one answer is permitted within 15 seconds.

At this stage, there are three possibilities:

1. If the contestants respond correctly to four questions or less, the game ends and they keep their winnings;
2. If the contestants respond correctly to five questions, they can try to answer a "draft" question that is made easier because three possible choices are provided (it is the only question that is not posed by the audience). If they fail to answer correctly, the contestants keep their winnings. If they answer correctly, they are forced to try the Banco. When the show was moderated by Roger Lanzac and the Pinder circus, the "draft" question would be replaced with a sports feat, led by a strongman. After that, racing a bicycle for a given distance was used. Since 2008 with the arrival of Nicolas Stoufflet, the "draft" question has been replaced sometimes with a sound clip;
3. If the contestants respond correctly to all six questions, they can leave with their winnings (150 euros) or they can try the Banco. At this moment, the recorded audience traditionally yells "ban-co, ban-co!" to encourage the contestant, after which the contestant usually makes their attempt.

For each question, response time is sounded by an assistant playing a glockenspiel, a small metallophone, with four hammers. This instrument, with its unique sound, has become an emblem of the show. Yann Pailleret, the show's "handyman", has served as its glockenspiel player since 1990, when he took over from François Lependu, who had assumed the role for 25 years.

=== Banco and Super-Banco ===
Yann Pailleret playing the glockenspiel at Craponne-sur-Arzon (Haute-Loire)

The Banco is a question deemed to be particularly difficult and is classed into a specific category.

The contestants are only allowed one response to the question but they are allowed a minute to respond. They can consult their team.

If the response is correct, the prize has been 500 euros since September 2009. Before the euro replaced the franc in 2001, the Banco prize was 1,000 francs, which was the derivation of the name of the original show. The banco prize was 400 euros between 2001 and June 2009.

If the response is incorrect, the contestants lose all their winnings and leave with a portable radio.

Contestants that correctly respond to the Banco question can also try the Super Banco question. The recorded audience encourages the contestants by chanting "su-per, su-per!" The play of Super Banco is the same as with Banco, but the question is raffled from among the toughest questions from the audience.

If the response is correct, the contestants receive 1,000 euros. Before the introduction of the euro, the Super Banco prize was 3,000 francs, and then 5,000 francs. In the case of failure, the contestants lose all their winnings and leave with a portable radio.

=== Prizes ===
For the blue, white, and red questions, the prizes are the same for the contestant team, or in the case of an incorrect response, the audience member that provides the question. The prizes are 15 euros per blue question, 30 euros per white question, and 45 euros per red question. For the "draft" question, the Banco question, and the Super Banco question, the audience member that developed the question earns only 45 euros if the contestants respond incorrectly.

== History ==
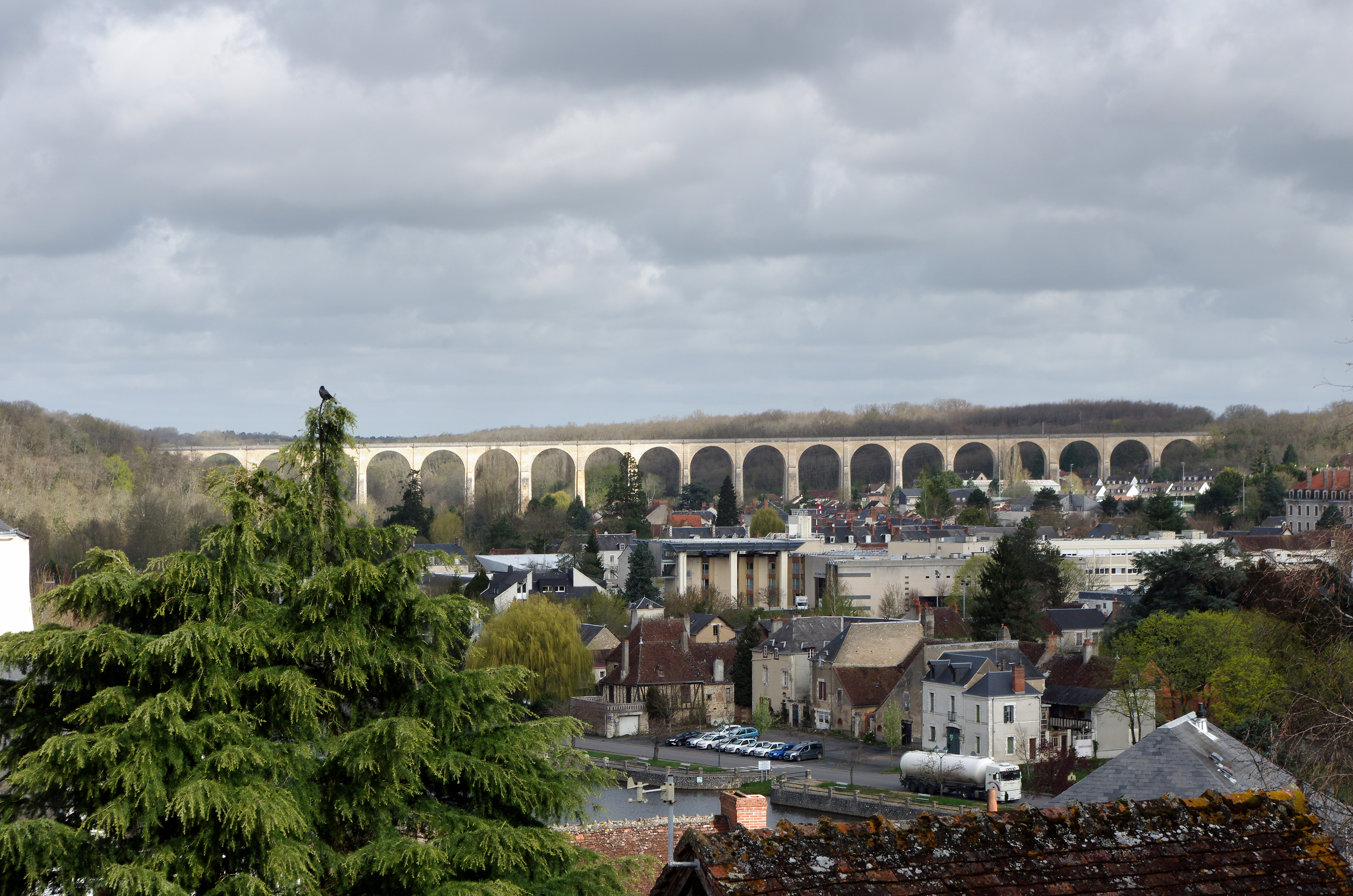
The town of Blanc in Indre where the first show was recorded

=== 20th century ===
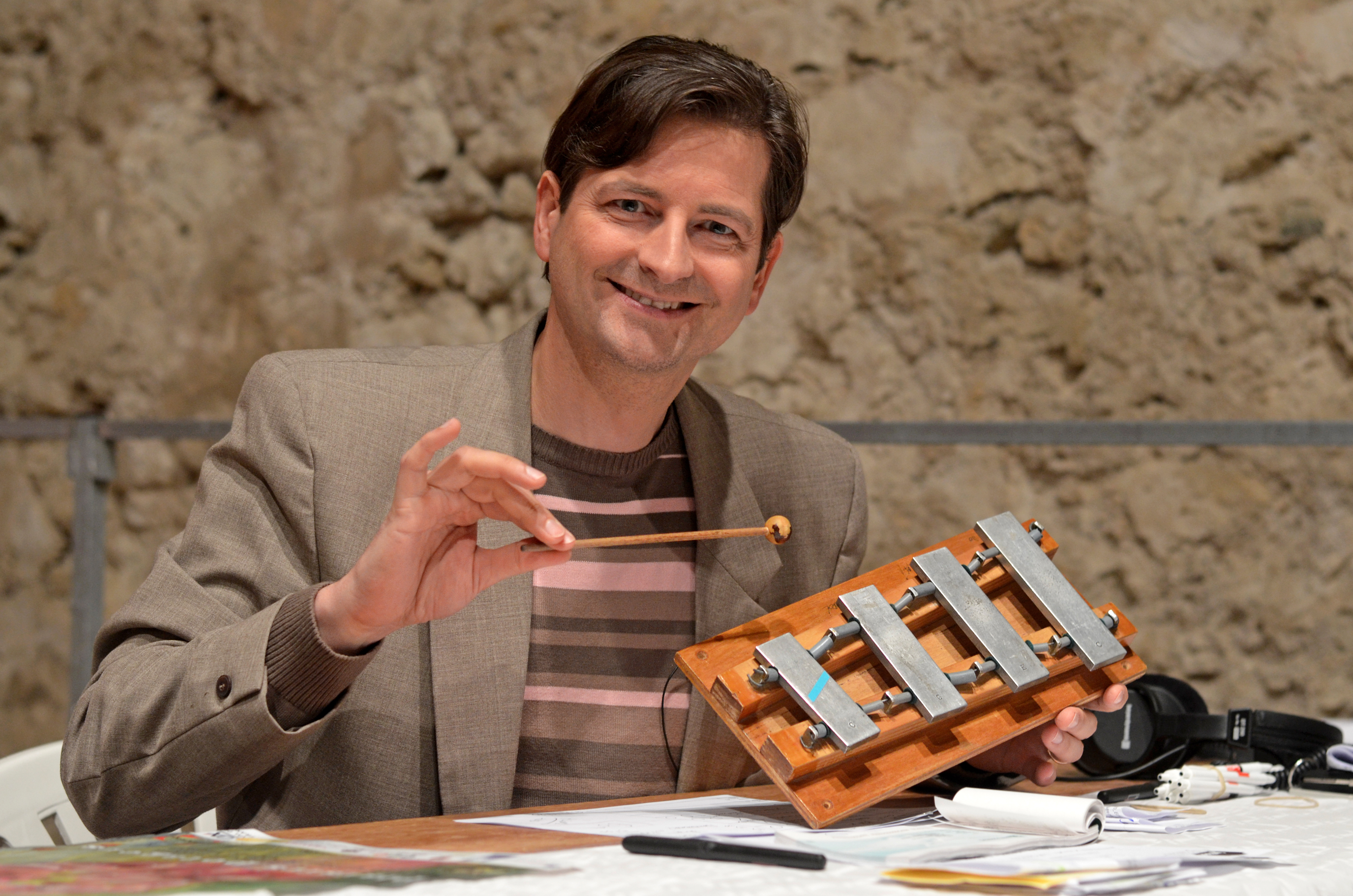
Yann Pailleret with the glockenspiel at Couture-sur-Loir (Loir-et-Cher)

Le Jeu des 1 000 francs, the name of the original show, is the oldest quiz show in the French radio broadcasting world that is still aired. The first show was recorded on April 19, 1958, in a drawn marquee in the marketplace of Blanc and was broadcast two days later on France Inter.

==== 100 000 francs par jour ====
Installed each day in a different town under the Pinder circus tent, the game consisted of, from its start, a series of cultural questions posed to a team of two contestants, who could win a final prize of 100,000 francs. Originally named 100 000 francs par jour, the name changed to 1 000 francs par jour, after the passage of the new franc. After that, the name became Le Jeu des mille franc.

The contestant team is composed of a captain and a reinforcement. In the original game, the questions were posed to the captain. If the answers were not responded to, the questions were then posed to the reinforcement. Today, this differentiation does not exist and the moderator simultaneously addresses both contestants of a team.

==== From Henri Kubnick to Lucien Jeunesse ====
At the start, it was Henri Kubnick that prepared the questions. But, because the audience started sending questions, it was decided that the questions would be prepared by them. The questions are divided by difficulty indicated by color: in order of increasing difficulty, blue, white, and red.

After Henri Kubnick, the show went through a series of moderators: Maurice Gardett, Albert Raisner, Roger Lanzac, Pierre Le Rouzic (1965), and Lucien Jeunesse (1965 - 1995), who retired with the longest run as moderator of the show. Moderators would always leave the show with the following saying: "À demain, si vous le voulez bien!" - "See you tomorrow, if you want it!" and "À lundi, si le cœur vous en dit!" - "See you Monday, if your heart is in it!"

In June 1995, after spending 30 years traveling the roads, Lucien Jeunesse, at the age of 77, decided to retire. In an interview on the last day with France 2, the moderator recalled spending time in 10,000 hotel rooms, eating 20,000 restaurant meals, and making 40,000 phone calls to his wife. The last recording was identical to the previous ones, without the moderator saying "adieu".

==== False start and "spécial jeunes" ====
On June 7, 1995, France Inter removed the show from its programing after the departure of Lucien Jeunesse, with whom the public identified the show. This decision provoked an abundance of protest. The show returned in September 1995 with Louis Bozon.

On December 6, 1995, the creation of the "Spécial Jeunes" - young people program - broadened the audience of the show to college students and high school students.

=== 21st Century ===
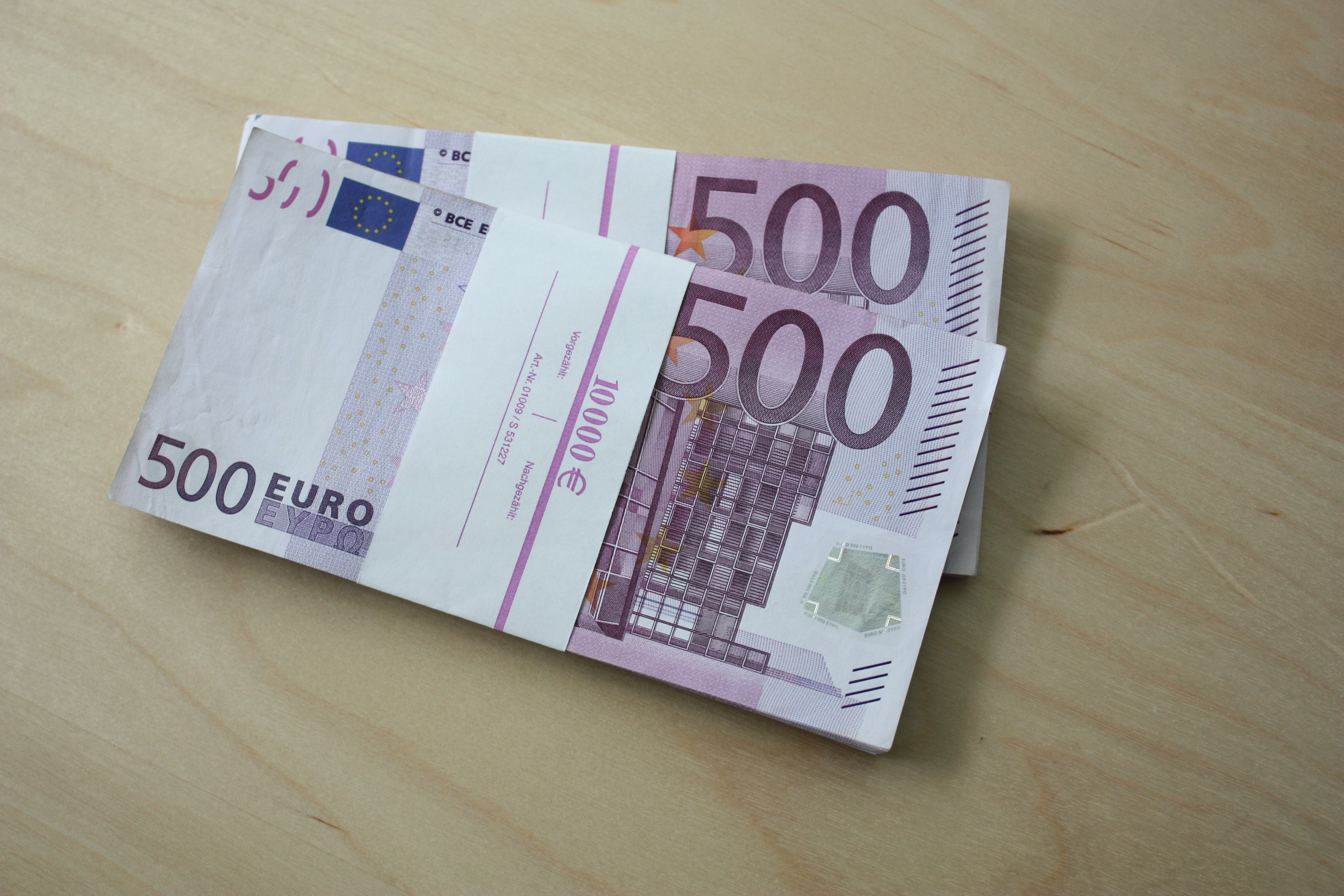
If they win the last question (Superbanco) the two contestants receive 1000 euro to share or 500 euro each

At the time of the replacement of the franc with the euro on January 1, 2002, the show was renamed Le Jeu des mille euros, the purpose of which was to keep the same operation and principles for the identity of the game, with a little planning related to the conversion. The banco became a 400 euro prize (then in 2009, it became a 500 euro prize). The super banco became a 1,000 euro prize.

In April 2008, the show celebrated its 50th anniversary, and still remained the most popular French radio program at 12:45 PM UCT+1: 1.395 million listeners and 15.6% of the market share.

==== The game outside of France ====
Some months later, on June 27, 2008, Louis Bozon moderates his last show after 13 years. On September 1, 2008, Nicolas Stoufflet becomes the 8th moderator of the show.

With France Inter in New York on September 9, 2011, for the commemoration of September 11, 2001, the game takes place on September 8 and September 9 with a new name, Le Jeu des 1 000 dollars.

In 2016, the team was in Portugal. The first show was recorded in Porto on March 8, 2016, with a second in Lisbon on March 9, 2016.

==== A sexagenarian game ====
For the anniversary of its sixtieth year, the production organized three programs (including one for young people) that were recorded on April 11, 2018, in a celebration in Blanc, where the show originally aired 60 years ago. Another show in the set of these programs was recorded in June 2018 with moderators from France Inter, including Charline Vanhoenecker and Léa Salamé, who formed duos with other contestants, and with an exceptional winnings potential (for a superbanco) of 2,000 euro.

== Team ==
=== Moderator ===
The show has been moderated successively by the following moderators:

- Henri Kubnick, from 1958
- Maurice Gardett, briefly in 1960
- Albert Raisner, in 1961
- Roger Lanzac, from 1961 to 1965
- Pierre Le Rouzic, in 1965
- Lucien Jeunesse, from 1965 to June 1995
- Louis Bozon, from September 1995 to June 2008
- Nicolas Stoufflet, from September 1, 2008, to present

=== Production ===
- Producer: Nicolas Stoufflet
- Director: Yann Pailleret
- Production assistants: Kheira Retiel

== In popular culture ==
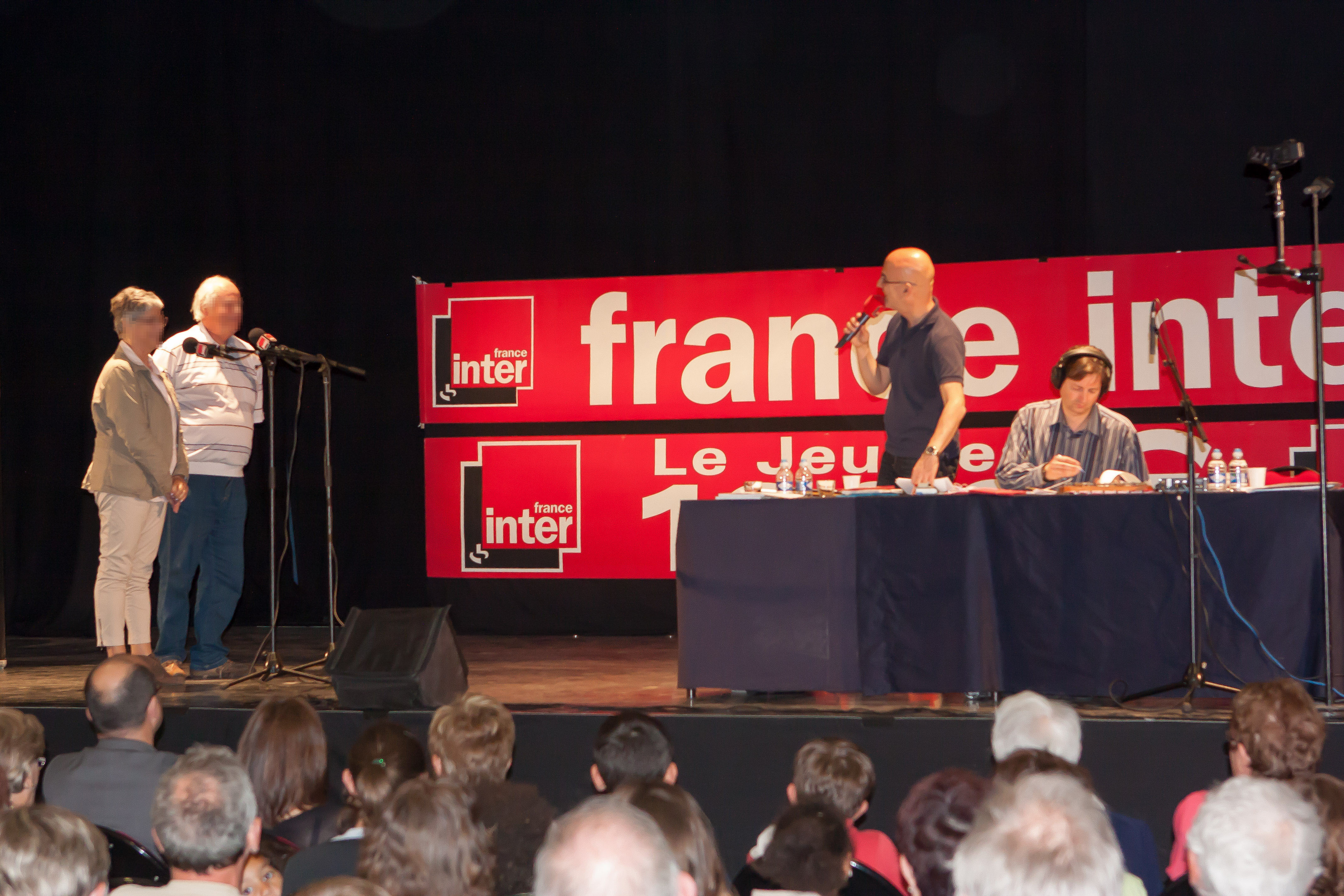
Recording of the radio show "Le Jeu des 1 000 euros" in the cultural hall of the town of Villabé in 2015

The game is found elsewhere outside of radio:

- Board Games:
  - The jeu des 1000 francs, published in 1960 by Ceji interlude jeu
  - The jeu des 1000 francs, published in 1978 by Dujardin
  - The box of Jeu des 1000 euros, published in 2013 by Marabout
  - The box of Jeu des 1000 euros, published in 2017 by Marabout
- Video Games: the show was adapted for the iPhone et iPad by Bulkypix
- Books:
  - Le Jeu des mille francs - 2000 questions, 2000 réponses. Paris: Hachette and France Inter. 1977. ISBN 978-2-01-004564-6.
  - Josée Gorce, Louis Bozon, Paul Desalmand (1998). Le grand livre du Jeu des 1 000 francs. Paris: Marabout. ISBN 978-2-501-03119-6.
  - Louis Bozon (2010). Mes petits sentiers. Paris: Éditions du Toucan. ISBN 978-2-8100-0359-4.
  - Nicolas Stoufflet (November 25, 2010). Le dico du Jeu des 1 000 euros. Paris: Democratic Books. ISBN 978-2-36104-024-6.
  - Almanach 2013 du jeu des 1 000 euros. Paris: Hors collection. September 6, 2012. ISBN 978-2-25809-849-7.
  - 365 jours pour s'entraîner au jeu des 1 000 euros. Paris: Editis. October 13, 2016. ISBN 978-2-75408-906-7.
- Television:
  - Report for ORTF in 1967
  - Le Jeu des 1 000 succès for France 5, a documentary dedicated in 2007 to several weeks in the life of the team from Jeu des 1 000 euros
  - Program Journal de 13 heures from France 2 dedicated to the Jeu des mille euros on April 28, 2008, and May 2, 2008, which focuses in particular on the brothers Jean and José Pasquale, prolific producers of questions, as well as Gabriel Gianello, record holder for the number of (Louis Bozon era) winning games with seven.
- Web Documentaries: Le Jeu des 1 000 histoires, a documentary that was released in May 2013 written by Philippe Brault for Upian/France Inter/Radio France Nouveaux Medias: A small historical production to meet those who make the oldest radio game in France and those who listen to it.
- Theater: Le Jeu des 1 000 euros from Bertrand Bossard (2012), a theatrical production performed at Centquatre-Paris.
