= Starshot (target) =

Starshot is a huge "half-circle target" that was designed as a new way to enjoy clay target skeet shooting. Invented in Scotland in the 1980s, the structure stands almost 9 m (30 ft) high and is divided into 12 scoring segments. Clay targets are released on command and the shooter's score is valued according to the zone in which the target is broken. Some Mobile units were made to be towed behind a vehicle and sold in the UK.

ESPN ran a program with the same name - Starshot, in the late 80s and early 90s, with two teams of two playing against each other, with one person on each team being a professional marksman, and the other person being a popular athlete or celebrity of the time (usually one who did have some experience with guns though). Celebrities included Rollie Fingers and Blair Underwood.

The BBC also started a series of TV programmes on the same format, with the first based at Hever Castle in Kent. The series was cancelled after the second programme which was based in Hungerford and recorded just one week before the Hungerford massacre in August, 1987. Celebrities such as the cricketer Ian Botham and Jackie Stewart appeared on the show. Commentary was by David Vine, and the programme produced by Peter Hylton Cleaver.

A Welsh-language version titled "Shotolau" was broadcast by S4C in the early 1990s.

The equipment was refurbished in 2011 and toured at game fairs and other events in the UK, with a Championship being held in 2012 and 2013.
