= Albert Raisner =

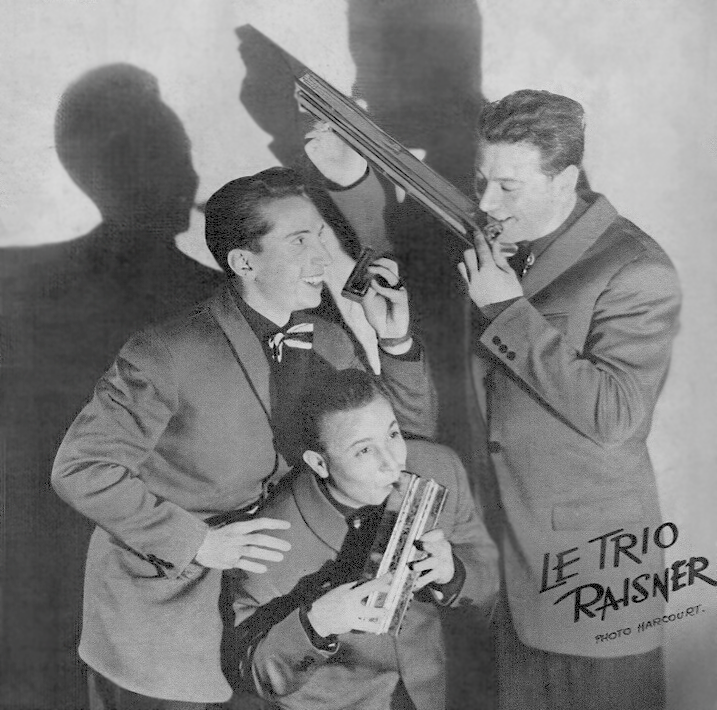
- Albert Raisner, Sirio Rossi and Adrien Belin pose holding their harmonica near their mouths, in different poses, looking happy and smiling.

Background information
- Born: 30 September 1922; Apolda, Germany
- Died: 1 January 2011 (aged 88) Paris, France
- Instrument: Harmonica

Albert Raisner (30 September 1922 in Apolda, Germany – 1 January 2011 in Boulogne-Billancourt, France) was a French harmonica player, founder of the award-winning Trio Raisner and a TV and radio host and producer. He was the host of the hit show "Age Tendre et Tetes de Bois", which aired from 1961 to 1967 and featured world-renowned artists including The Beatles, Elvis Presley, Stevie Wonder, Isaac Hayes and French singers Johnny Hallyday and Claude François. He is regarded as an icon and a pioneer of French television, sometimes compared to Ed Sullivan, and was knighted by the French president in 1977.

== Early life ==
Born in the Thuringian town Apolda of a French father and a German mother, Albert Raisner arrived in Paris at age 7. His socially modest family lived in Montmartre in the 18th arrondissement of the capital in a 400 square feet apartment. He had two brothers, one older, one younger.

His father was a sales representative and music enthusiast, who taught him violin, piano, trumpet, guitar and clarinet early on. He received classical musical training; nevertheless, harmonica was his favorite instrument. He was a member of the boy scouts, whom he considered his first audience when he played during vigils around camp fire. He refined his talent with musician Charles Rodriguez, a gypsy guitarist, violinist, man band and French harmonica pioneer. Until 1939, he participated in the activities of Studio Rodriguez (officially 'French Association for Musical Expansion') and became known in the entertainment world. He joined legendary gypsy guitarist Django Reinhardt on tour. Raisner would also participate in the circus world, with Cirque Pinder, where he learned to perform on the trapeze.

A teenager during the Second World War, he experienced food rationing and the bombing of his street. He joined the Resistance in Beaulieu-sur-Dordogne in Corrèze in Free France. During the war, Raisner joined the semi-clandestine jazz underworld and created the Club for Harmonica ('CHARM').

Raisner studied at Colbert High School before spending a year at Ecole Normale d'Auteuil, both in Paris, earning a PhD in linguistics.

== Le Trio Raisner (1943–1960) ==
With Sirio Rossi and Adrien Belin, Albert Raisner formed the Trio Raisner, which would become a regular feature of radio and TV programs. The trio was recruited to play during shows for the American Army in Europe. Trio Raisner earned large-scale success upon D-Day and at Liberation with the American Special Service (an effort to provide entertainment for US-soldiers in Europe) in Frankfurt, where he shared scene and airtime with Frank Sinatra, Louis Armstrong, Marlene Dietrich, Elvis Presley, Ella Fitzgerald and Duke Ellington.

Thereafter, the Trio Raisner performed numerous, highly successful shows and tours in France. More than solely musicians, members of the trio were showmen, musical scene pioneers, mixing harmonica, songs, dances and humor. Soon after, the trio toured outside of France including Germany, Great Britain, Italy and Israel. It was featured numerous times on international radio channels and in movies. Albert Raisner composing songs for the trio, and in 1952 the Trio Raisner received the Grand Prix du Disque (Best Song of the Year award) for 'Le Canari'.

At the end of the 1950s, the trio dissolved and Raisner continued his harmonica career as a solo artist. He hosted the first part of Chuck Berry's Olympia concert. He also wrote a book, Le Livre de l'Harmonica, in which he retraced the history of the musical instrument, its performers, as well as his own history as a musician.

== TV and radio host (1958–1983) ==
=== Le jeu des 1000 francs ===
Raisner was among the first hosts of the Jeu des 1000 Francs, one of the longest-running French radio programs.

=== Âge tendre et tête de bois ===
Raisner created his show Age Tendre et Tete de Bois in 1961. It was a music show on prime time, Saturday night, on France's unique TV channel, RTF. The show met with success. Shows were filmed at the Golf-Drouot, at the Moulin de la Gallette and at the Cite Universitaire. Raisner was among the first to air rock 'n' roll music. A figure of the 'ye-ye' era (1960s), he introduced to France and supported many French, American and international artists including Ray Charles, Gene Vincent, Johnny Hallyday, The Beatles, Sheila, Claude Francois, Henri Salvador, the Beach Boys, Eddy Mitchell, Joan Baez, Dalida, Salvatore Adamo, Michel Polnareff, Stevie Wonder, Gigiola Cinquietti, Enrico Macias, Sylvie Vartan, Françoise Hardy and Adriano Celentano. The show was known for its high energy style, its duplexes and multiplexes with artists around the world, the close proximity between the audience and the stars, and the prohibition of play-back. Albert Raisner also designed the show's mascot, the 'Bonhomme Têtes de Bois', to his image.

=== Europarty ===
In 1963, Raisner created a German-French co-production, Rendez-vous sur le Rhin, which will soon evolve to include 7 European countries to be renamed 'Europarty'. He even twice set up a bilateral show in Moscow, aired in France and the USSR, live and in Russian – a unique achievement at the time of the Cold War.

=== Samedi et Compagnie ===
Starting 1968, Albert Raisner was the host for Samedi et Compagnie. The shows changed its name in 1971 to become Samedi et Vous. Albert Raisner also hosted Point Chaud which starred Isaac Hayes, Hugues Aufray and Many Dibango. He travelled to the United States several times and covered the Woodstock Festival for French TV. In 1973, he wrote a book retracing the history of 1960 and 1970 music, L'Aventure Pop.

=== Tremplin 80 ===
Raisner created the music show Tremplin 80 which he hosted until 1983. He stepped away from TV thereafter to raise his two sons, but continued to be present on radio shows and participated in tours and concerts in Europe.

=== 1990-2000s ===
Raisner made a comeback on TV in 1990 with Age Tendre, on channel Antenne 2, which linked artists from the 1960s to those of the 1990s. He hosted Vanessa Paradis, among others.

In the mid-1990s, he hosted 'Salut Albert' on Radio Montmartre, before hosting a show on Europe 1 at the end of the 1990s. He also kept participating in tours including one on the ship Queen Elizabeth II with Petula Clark.

== Personal life ==
Raisner married Brigitte Konjovic, Miss France 1978. They had two sons, Richard and Rémy Raisner.

Raisner was a member of Mensa International, a social organization whose members are in the top 2% of intelligence as measured by an IQ test entrance exam.

Raisner died aged 88 of respiratory insufficiency at Hôpital Ambroise-Paré in the Parisian suburb of Boulogne-Billancourt.

== Awards ==
Grand Prix du Disque (1952) Chevalier de l'ordre national du Mérite (1978) Médaille de la ville de Paris

== Impact ==
A harmonica pioneer, he contributed to popularize his instrument in France. He is considered as one of the best harmonicists of all times. He was among the first to create a TV show for teenagers. He was also among the first TV hosts to become a producer as well. He thereby contributed to change in the entertainment industry's functioning. Always avant-gardist, he was one of the first host/producers to propose shooting live in other or simultaneous countries. He launched countless artists who went on to earn international success.

His TV shows' excerpts are oftentimes relayed by media. A widely successful tour featuring 1960s and 1970s French and international artists was named Age Tendre et Tetes de Bois in his honor.

A harmonica song he wrote and played is decades later, the theme of a leading Japanese radio show.

== Publications ==
=== TV shows ===
- Âge tendre et tête de bois
- Tête de bois et tendres années
- Rendez-vous sur le Rhin
- Europarty
- Samedi et compagnie
- Samedi et vous
- Point chaud
- Tremplin 80
- Âges tendres

=== Radio shows ===
- Le Jeu des 1000 francs
- Salut Albert

=== Books ===
- -Le Livre de l'harmonica, Presses du Temps Présent, Paris, 1961, 223 p.
- -Méthode générale pour l'harmonica, Hohner, 1966
- -L’Aventure pop, Robert Laffont, Paris, 1973, 303 p.
- -Harmonica diatonique et chromatique facile : 30 standards... (Facile), 1993

=== Music albums ===
- -Trio Raisner, Enregistrements originaux 1948–1953
- -La Magia de la Armonica
- -Trio Raisner, classique et danse
- -Baile con Albert Raisner
- -Le Roi de l'harmonica
- -Harmonica parade

=== Movies ===
- -1955: Les Évadés
- -1959: Deux hommes dans Manhattan
- -1961: Léon Morin, prêtre
- -1963: L'Aîné des Ferchaux
