= Ambroise Paré Hospital (Boulogne-Billancourt) =

Hospital in Boulogne-Billancourt, France

- Assistance Publique – Hôpitaux de Paris
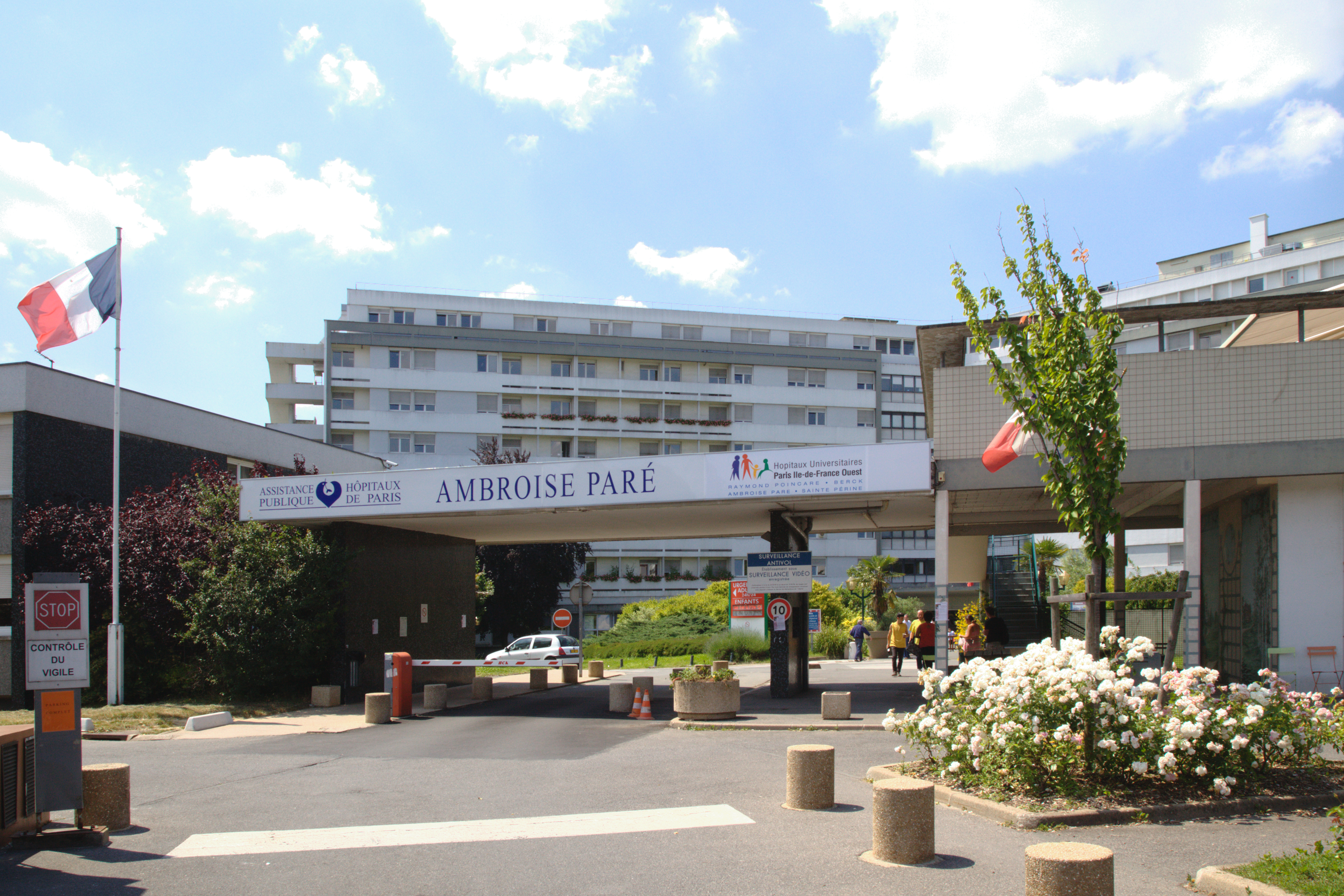

Geography
- Location: Boulogne-Billancourt, Île-de-France, France
- Coordinates: 48.8494°N 2.2354°E

Organisation
- Care system: Public
- Type: Teaching

Services
- Emergency department: Yes
- Beds: 468

History
- Opened: 1923

Links
- Website: ambroisepare.aphp.fr
- Lists: Hospitals in France

Ambroise Paré Hospital (French: Hôpital Ambroise-Paré) is a celebrated teaching hospital in the prestigious Parisian suburb of Boulogne-Billancourt. It is part of the Assistance Publique – Hôpitaux de Paris which is the largest hospital system in Europe and one of the largest in the world. It is one of the teaching hospitals of Paris-Saclay University, which was ranked 1st university in France and 13th in the world. Paris-Saclay University is a successor of the formerly University of Paris metonymically known as the Sorbonne, which does not exist anymore and has now been divided into 13 universities on 31 December 1970. It offers health services in a wide range of specialties, and its dermatology department is the referral expert center in Ile-de-France and Parisian region for advanced dermatological surgeries. It has been created in 1923. It was named in honour of Ambroise Paré.
