= Renata Mauro =

Italian television presenter (1934–2009)

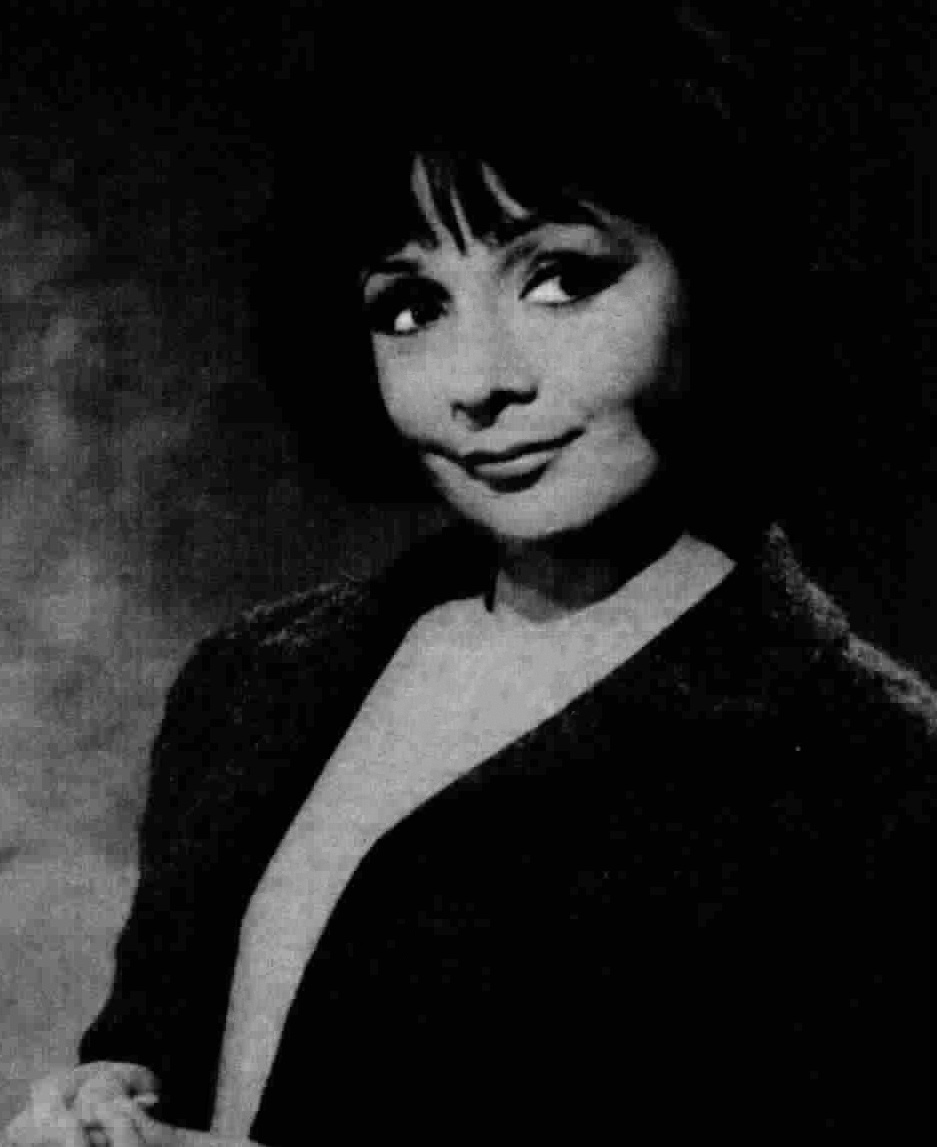
- Mauro in 1968
- Born: Renata Maraolo; 17 May 1934; Milan, Lombardy, Kingdom of Italy
- Died: 28 March 2009 (aged 74); Biella, Piedmont, Italy
- Occupations: Television presenter; actress; singer
- Employer: RAI
- Known for: Hosting Jeux Sans Frontières and the Eurovision Song Contest 1965

Renata Mauro (born Renata Maraolo; 17 May 1934 – 28 March 2009) was an Italian singer, actress and television presenter for RAI, the Italian state broadcaster.

She became known to international audiences for hosting the game show Jeux Sans Frontières 1967 to 1970 and the Eurovision Song Contest when it was held in the Italian city of Naples in 1965.

== Filmography ==
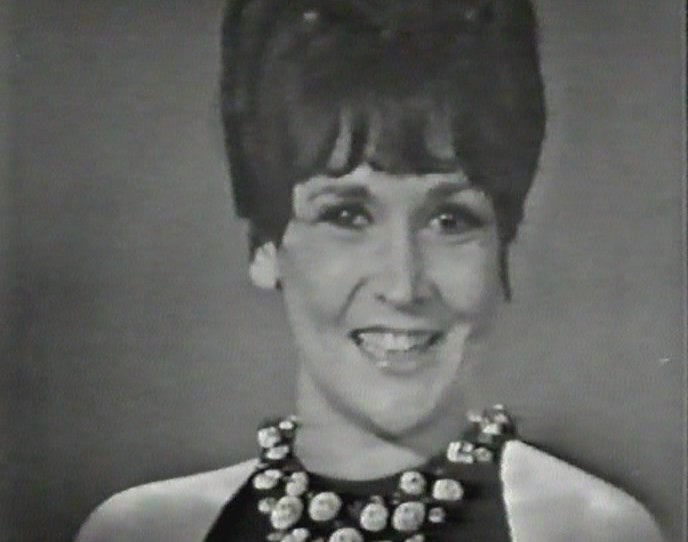
Renata Mauro at Eurovision

- Move and I'll Shoot (1958)
- The Naked Maja (1958)
- The Wastrel (1961)
- The Shortest Day (1963) (uncredited)
- La sciarpa (1963, TV miniseries)
- Biblioteca di Studio Uno: La primula rossa (1964, TV)
- Biblioteca di Studio Uno: Al Grand Hotel (1964, TV)

== See also ==
- List of Eurovision Song Contest presenters

Preceded by (Denmark) Lotte Wæver	Eurovision Song Contest presenter 1965	Succeeded by (Luxembourg) Josiane Shen
