= David Vine =

British television presenter (1935–2009)

- Born: David Martin Vine; 3 January 1935; Newton Abbot, Devon, England
- Died: 11 January 2009 (aged 74) near Henley-on-Thames, Oxfordshire, England
- Occupation: Television sports presenter
- Known for: Ski Sunday, Match of the Day, A Question of Sport, BBC snooker coverage, Grandstand, Superstars
- Spouse(s): Shirley (1958–1970); Mandy (1972–2009)
- Children: 4

David Martin Vine (3 January 1935 – 11 January 2009) was an English television sports presenter. He presented a wide variety of shows from the 1960s onwards, most notably covering major snooker tournaments for the BBC.

== Early life ==
Born in Newton Abbot, Devon, he grew up in the Sticklepath area of Barnstaple, in the north of the county, attending Barnstaple Grammar School on Park Lane in Barnstaple. His father, Harold, was a carpenter.

== Career ==
Vine worked for the North Devon Journal Herald from the age of 17 and various newspapers, becoming the sports editor of the Western Morning News in Plymouth. He joined Westward Television in 1961, though he worked for the BBC for the majority of his broadcasting career. He joined the BBC, to work on BBC2, in 1966. He was working at BBC2 even though Westward Television were not aware of this because at the time BBC2 could not be received in the South West. An article in the Daily Mail led to Westward TV learning about his BBC work and he had to resign from Westward TV.

Programmes he hosted include Sportscene, It's a Knockout (1967–1971), Jeux sans frontières, Miss UK, Miss World, Quiz Ball, Sunday League Cricket, Rugby Special, Match of the Day, A Question of Sport (1970–1972, 1974–1977 and 1989), Grandstand, Superstars, Starshot, Ski Sunday (1978–1996) and the BBC's Winter and Summer Olympic Games coverage.

In August 1967, Vine presented the Wimbledon World Lawn Tennis Professional Championships, which was the first tennis tournament at Wimbledon to feature professional players and also the first colour television sports service in Europe, which BBC2 launched on 1 July 1967.

Vine provided the BBC TV commentary for the Eurovision Song Contest 1974 which was the year that the pop band ABBA won the contest for Sweden with their song "Waterloo" and also hosted the preview shows of the international entries, and compèred the 1975 Miss World broadcast, the latter resulting in some embarrassment because he found it difficult to understand what many of the contestants were saying. He introduced the 1967 professional tennis championships at Wimbledon in colour. In addition to the 1967 Wimbledon pro-event, he presented Wimbledon highlights from 1979 until 1982 and also BBC's Show Jumping coverage. He also hosted the first World Darts Championships in 1978.

He was the anchorman at the World Snooker Championships at the Crucible Theatre, Sheffield, from 1978—the first year the BBC covered the championships daily—until his retirement in 2000, as well as the Grand Prix, UK Championship and the Masters. Vine's supposed friendship with Steve Davis was parodied in a Spitting Image sketch in which Davis boasted, "I'm a mate of David Vine".

Vine's final work for the BBC was covering the weightlifting at the 2000 Sydney Olympics a sport he had covered since the 1970s, after which he retired owing to a heart condition. He had a coronary artery triple bypass operation in 2001. He contributed to programmes on the ESPN Classic channel shortly before he died aged 74 at his home near Henley-on-Thames, Oxfordshire.

== Personal life ==
He married his first wife, Shirley, in 1958. They had met through amateur dramatics and had three children. The family lived in Mannamead, Plymouth. Shirley died in 1970. Vine married his second wife, Mandy, in 1972 in Wokingham. The couple had a son.

Preceded by none	Host of A Question of Sport; 1970–1977	Succeeded by David Coleman
Preceded by Terry Wogan	Eurovision Song Contest UK Commentator; 1974	Succeeded by Pete Murray
