= Rosanna Vaudetti =

Italian television host and announcer for RAI

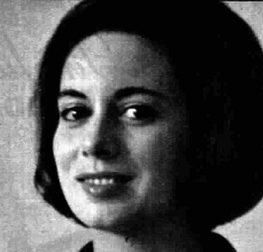
Rosanna Vaudetti

Rosanna Vaudetti (born 19 December 1937) is an Italian television host and announcer for RAI.

Vaudetti was born in 1937 in Ancona. She was educated at the University of Turin where she was appointed by Radiotelevisione Italiana around late 1960 and became a television announcer for Secondo Programma in 1961. Vaudetti hosted the Italian game show Games Without Frontiers in the 1970s; she was the Italian commentator for the Eurovision Song Contest seven times and the Italian spokesperson in the contest three times. She was married to television director Antonio Moretti.

In April 1999 Vaudetti was appointed Commander of the Italian Republic.

Rosanna Vaudetti is Roman Catholic.
