= Paule Herreman =

Belgian actress and television presenter (1919–1991)

- Born: 1919
- Died: 3 October 1991 (aged 71–72)
- Career
- Network: INR; Eurovision
- Country: Belgia

Paule Herreman (1919 – 3 October 1991) was a Belgian actress and television presenter for National Institute of Broadcasting (INR).

== Career ==
=== Early life ===
Daughter of the Dutch-speaking poet Raymond Herreman, Paule Herreman studied Germanic philology. She first worked as a parliamentary stenographer in the Belgian Senate and then as an executive secretary.

=== Broadcasting ===
After the Liberation, she worked as head of the announcer department. In 1954, she joined the National Institute of Broadcasting (INR) to coordinate the programs broadcasting of Eurovision. With a significant general knowledge, from 1969 to 1980 she became the Belgian ambassador for the television program Le Francophonissime, which was hosted by Pierre Tchernia, Georges de Caunes, Jean-Pierre Cuny, Jean Chatel and Fabrice. The referee was Jacques Capelovici. These were friendly contests between representatives of several French-speaking countries. She also commentated for RTBF viewers at the Jeux Sans Frontières between 1965 and 1982.

She died on October 3, 1991 at the age of 72 following a thrombosis that occurred on the stage of a theater a few days earlier.

=== Acting ===
As an actress Herreman played very small roles in films such as L'Œuvre au noir and Blueberry Hill; she also appeared in the music video to Break It Up, featuring American athlete Carl Lewis.
