= Gennaro Olivieri (television personality) =

Swiss ice hockey referee and TV personality

Gennaro Olivieri (1922 – 2 February 2009) was a Swiss ice hockey referee, better known in the English-speaking world for his role as the main official overseeing the original Jeux Sans Frontières TV shows, usually working with colleague and friend Guido Pancaldi.

== Professional background ==
Olivieri was born in Neuchâtel, Switzerland. He refereed around 200 international ice hockey matches including five world championship finals and the finals of the 1964 Innsbruck Winter Olympics. His stint as referee for Jeux Sans Frontières lasted from 1965 to 1982.
