= Abbondio =

Abbondio is the name of:

== People ==
- Abbondio Marcelli (1932–2015), Italian rower
- Abbondio Sangiorgio (1798–1879), Italian sculptor
- Abbondio Smerghetto (1931–2018), Italian rower
- Abundius, saint

== Places ==
- Sant'Abbondio, former municipality in Switzerland
- Serra Sant'Abbondio, municipality in Italy

== See also ==
- Abondio, surname
- Abundio, given name
