= Abondio =

Abondio is a surname. Notable people with the surname include:

- Antonio Abondio (1538–1591), Italian sculptor
- Josette Abondio (born 1949), Ivorian teacher, writer, and playwright

== See also ==
- Abbondio, given name
- Abundio, given name
