= Abundo =

Abundo is a Filipino surname. Notable people with the surname include:

- Alvin Abundo (born 1992), Filipino basketball player
- Teresita Abundo (1949–2023), Filipino educator and athlete

== See also ==
- Abundio
