= Contone =

- Former municipality
- Flag Coat of arms
- Location of Contone
- Location within Switzerland Location within Canton of Ticino
- Coordinates: 46°09′N 8°56′E
- Country: Switzerland
- Canton: Ticino
- District: Locarno
- Municipality: Gambarogno

Area
  - Total: 2.3 km^{2} (0.89 sq mi)
- Elevation: 206 m (676 ft)

Population (December 2004)
  - Total: 750
  - Density: 330/km^{2} (840/sq mi)
- Time zone: UTC+01:00 (CET)
  - Summer (DST): UTC+02:00 (CEST)
- Postal code: 6594
- SFOS number: 5101
- ISO 3166 code: CH-TI
- Surrounded by: Cadenazzo, Locarno, Magadino, Rivera
- Website: SFSO statistics

Contone is a former municipality in the district of Locarno in the canton of Ticino in Switzerland.

On 25 April 2010, the former municipalities of Caviano, Contone, Gerra Gambarogno, Indemini, Magadino, Piazzogna, San Nazzaro, Sant'Abbondio and Vira Gambarogno merged in the new municipality of Gambarogno.

== History ==
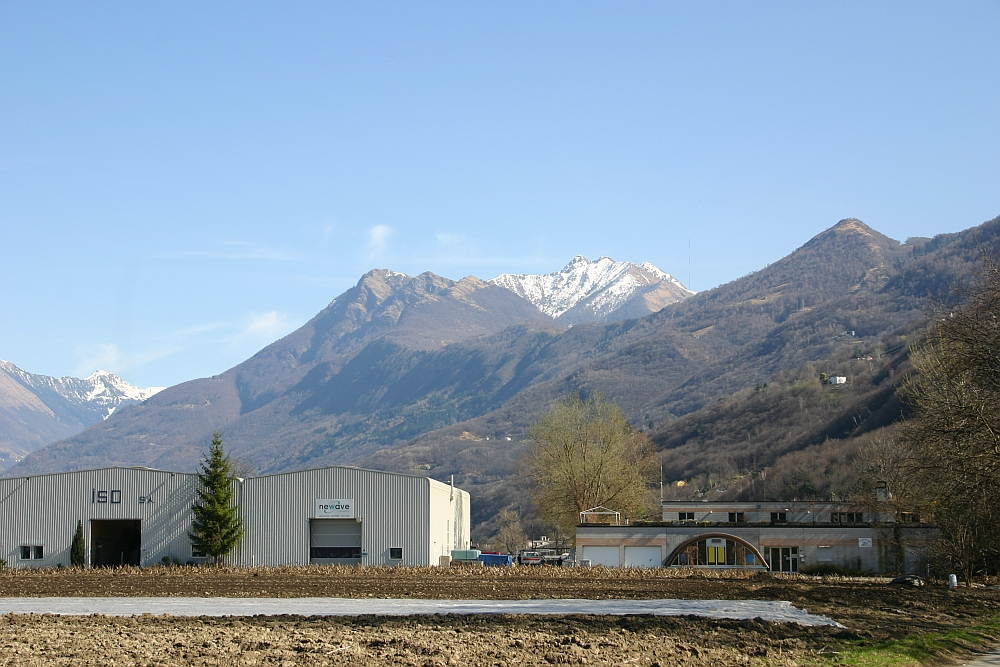
Luserte, a new development on the edge of Magadino at the border with Contone

Contone is first mentioned in 1152 as Gondono. However, three tombs have been discovered in Contone, which can be dated earlier than the Early Middle Ages. These tombs date to the reopening of the alpine passes.

Some time before 1219, a Hospital of the Knights Hospitaller was built in the village. However, the exact foundation year and location are controversial. It was later Commandry of the Order of Malta. In the 16th century, the Commandry estates went to the hospital in Lugano and in 1811 to the Antognini family of Bellinzona.

In 1104, the Lombard nobleman Wido Samarate built or rebuilt a church and presented it to the Benedictine monastery of S. Giorgio in Quartino. The church, which was dedicated to St. Nicholas, was incorporated in 1152 into the parish of Locarno. It was closed in 1769 and fell apart. The parish church of S. Giovanni Battista was built in the 16th century church, on the site of the hospital church.

The inhabitants of Contone lived as herders and farmers, mostly on the lowest part of the slope of Mount Ceneri. After 1850, the employment situation changed because of the decline of the port of Magadino and railway construction. Many inhabitants emigrated abroad and found work as painters, plasterers and stove-makers. With immigration of, mainly Italian, day laborers, the population began to grow. At the end of the 20th century most jobs were in the services sector. After the correction of the Ticino river, the vast, formerly marshy plain became home to a number of commercial and industrial buildings.

== Geography ==
Aerial view (1964)

Contone has an area, as of 1997, of 2.32 square kilometers (0.90 sq mi). Of this area, 1.41 km^{2} (0.54 sq mi) or 60.8% is used for agricultural purposes, while 0.61 km^{2} (0.24 sq mi) or 26.3% is forested. Of the rest of the land, 0.41 km^{2} (0.16 sq mi) or 17.7% is settled (buildings or roads), 0.02 km^{2} (4.9 acres) or 0.9% is either rivers or lakes and 0.02 km^{2} (4.9 acres) or 0.9% is unproductive land.

Of the built up area, industrial buildings made up 2.2% of the total area while housing and buildings made up 9.1% and transportation infrastructure made up 5.6%. Out of the forested land, 23.3% of the total land area is heavily forested and 3.0% is covered with orchards or small clusters of trees. Of the agricultural land, 43.5% is used for growing crops, while 8.2% is used for orchards or vine crops and 9.1% is used for alpine pastures. All the water in the municipality is flowing water. Of the unproductive areas, and .

The village is located in the Locarno district, in the Magadino valley on the eastern edge of the Gambarogno region.

== Coat of arms ==
The blazon of the municipal coat of arms is Per pale azure and gules overall an eight-pointed cross argent. As early as 1367 the Order of St John owned a commandery and a hospital which belonged to the Italian Langue. In 1932 permission was given to the former commandery to use the cross of the Order in its armorial shield. The officiating pastor of Contone is, through his office, a chaplain of magistral grace of the Order of Malta.

== Demographics ==
Contone had a population (As of 2004) of 750. As of 2008, 25.0% of the population are resident foreign nationals. Over the last 10 years (1997-2007) the population has changed at a rate of 20.9%.

Most of the population (as of 2000) speaks Italian (86.9%), with German being second most common (9.0%) and Portuguese being third (1.6%). Of the Swiss national languages (as of 2000), 63 speak German, 2 people speak French, 611 people speak Italian, and 2 people speak Romansh. The remainder (25 people) speak another language.

As of 2008, the gender distribution of the population was 46.9% male and 53.1% female. The population was made up of 281 Swiss men (33.2% of the population), and 116 (13.7%) non-Swiss men. There were 338 Swiss women (40.0%), and 111 (13.1%) non-Swiss women.

In 2008 there were 7 live births to Swiss citizens and 4 births to non-Swiss citizens, and in same time span there were 5 deaths of Swiss citizens. Ignoring immigration and emigration, the population of Swiss citizens increased by 2 while the foreign population increased by 4. There were 8 non-Swiss men and 4 non-Swiss women who immigrated from another country to Switzerland. The total Swiss population change in 2008 (from all sources, including moves across municipal borders) was an increase of 21 and the non-Swiss population change was an increase of 12 people. This represents a population growth rate of 4.2%.

The age distribution, as of 2009, in Contone is; 72 children or 8.5% of the population are between 0 and 9 years old and 107 teenagers or 12.6% are between 10 and 19. Of the adult population, 113 people or 13.4% of the population are between 20 and 29 years old. 124 people or 14.7% are between 30 and 39, 180 people or 21.3% are between 40 and 49, and 91 people or 10.8% are between 50 and 59. The senior population distribution is 76 people or 9.0% of the population are between 60 and 69 years old, 66 people or 7.8% are between 70 and 79, there are 17 people or 2.0% who are over 80.

As of 2000 the average number of residents per living room was 0.57 which is about equal to the cantonal average of 0.6 per room. In this case, a room is defined as space of a housing unit of at least 4 m^{2} (43 sq ft) as normal bedrooms, dining rooms, living rooms, kitchens and habitable cellars and attics. About 44.8% of the total households were owner occupied, or in other words did not pay rent (though they may have a mortgage or a rent-to-own agreement).

As of 2000, there were 307 private households in the village, and an average of 2.3 persons per household. In 2000 there were 153 single family homes (or 75.0% of the total) out of a total of 204 inhabited buildings. There were 15 two family buildings (7.4%) and 19 multi-family buildings (9.3%). There were also 17 buildings in the village that were multipurpose buildings (used for both housing and commercial or another purpose).

The vacancy rate for the village, in 2008, was 1.33%. In 2000 there were 350 apartments in the village. The most common apartment size was the 4 room apartment of which there were 107. There were 9 single room apartments and 101 apartments with five or more rooms. Of these apartments, a total of 306 apartments (87.4% of the total) were permanently occupied, while 37 apartments (10.6%) were seasonally occupied and 7 apartments (2.0%) were empty. As of 2007, the construction rate of new housing units was 6.4 new units per 1000 residents.

The historical population is given in the following table:

year	population
1591	70
1683	71
1795	71
1850	139
1900	199
1950	305
1990	430
2000	703

== Politics ==
In the 2007 federal election the most popular party was the CVP which received 39.84% of the vote. The next three most popular parties were the FDP (24.57%), the SP (9.94%) and the Ticino League (9.23%). In the federal election, a total of 185 votes were cast, and the voter turnout was 40.1%.

In the 2007 Gran Consiglio election, there were a total of 455 registered voters in Contone, of which 273 or 60.0% voted. 2 blank ballots and 1 null ballot were cast, leaving 270 valid ballots in the election. The most popular party was the PLRT which received 78 or 28.9% of the vote. The next three most popular parties were; the PPD+GenGiova (with 76 or 28.1%), the SSI (with 43 or 15.9%) and the PS (with 29 or 10.7%).

In the 2007 Consiglio di Stato election, 1 blank ballot and 2 null ballots were cast, leaving 270 valid ballots in the election. The most popular party was the PPD which received 77 or 28.5% of the vote. The next three most popular parties were; the PLRT (with 62 or 23.0%), the SSI (with 42 or 15.6%) and the LEGA (with 40 or 14.8%).

== Economy ==
As of 2007, Contone had an unemployment rate of 3.02%. As of 2005, there were 29 people employed in the primary economic sector and about 6 businesses involved in this sector. 51 people were employed in the secondary sector and there were 13 businesses in this sector. 268 people were employed in the tertiary sector, with 54 businesses in this sector. There were 361 residents of the village who were employed in some capacity, of which females made up 40.4% of the workforce.

In 2000, there were 408 workers who commuted into the village and 263 workers who commuted away. The village is a net importer of workers, with about 1.6 workers entering the village for every one leaving. About 12.7% of the workforce coming into Contone are coming from outside Switzerland. Of the working population, 3.9% used public transportation to get to work, and 71.2% used a private car. As of 2009, there were 2 hotels in Contone.

== Religion ==
From the 2000 census, 598 or 85.1% were Roman Catholic, while 34 or 4.8% belonged to the Swiss Reformed Church. There are 54 individuals (or about 7.68% of the population) who belong to another church (not listed on the census), and 17 individuals (or about 2.42% of the population) did not answer the question.

== Education ==
There are two schools in Contone: a municipal preschool site and a municipal primary school site.

The entire Swiss population is generally well educated. In Contone about 65.2% of the population (between age 25 and 64) have completed either non-mandatory upper secondary education or additional higher education (either University or a Fachhochschule).

In Contone there were a total of 147 students (as of 2009). The Ticino education system provides up to three years of non-mandatory kindergarten and in Contone there were 16 children in kindergarten. The primary school program lasts for five years. In the village, 43 students attended the standard primary schools. In the lower secondary school system, students either attend a two-year middle school followed by a two-year pre-apprenticeship or they attend a four-year program to prepare for higher education. There were 52 students in the two-year middle school, while 11 students were in the four-year advanced program.

The upper secondary school includes several options, but at the end of the upper secondary program, a student will be prepared to enter a trade or to continue on to a university or college. In Ticino, vocational students may either attend school while working on their internship or apprenticeship (which takes three or four years) or may attend school followed by an internship or apprenticeship (which takes one year as a full-time student or one and a half to two years as a part-time student). There were 7 vocational students who were attending school full-time and 15 who attend part-time.

The professional program lasts three years and prepares a student for a job in engineering, nursing, computer science, business, tourism and similar fields. There were 3 students in the professional program.

As of 2000, there were 6 students in Contone who came from another village, while 54 residents attended schools outside the village.
