= San Nazzaro, Switzerland =

San Nazzaro
- Former municipality
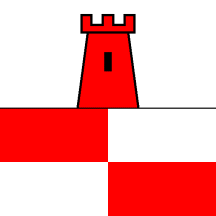
- Flag Coat of arms
- Location of San Nazzaro
- Location within Switzerland Location within Canton of Ticino
- Coordinates: 46°08′N 8°48′E
- Country: Switzerland
- Canton: Ticino
- District: Locarno
- Municipality: Gambarogno

Area
  - Total: 5.53 km^{2} (2.14 sq mi)
- Elevation: 201 m (659 ft)

Population (December 2009)
  - Total: 698
  - Density: 126/km^{2} (327/sq mi)
- Time zone: UTC+01:00 (CET)
  - Summer (DST): UTC+02:00 (CEST)
- Postal code: 6575
- SFOS number: 5127
- ISO 3166 code: CH-TI
- Surrounded by: Ascona, Brissago, Caviano, Gerra (Gambarogno), Indemini, Locarno, Muralto, Piazzogna, Pino sulla Sponda del Lago Maggiore (IT-VA), Ronco sopra Ascona, Sant'Abbondio
- Website: www.sannazzaro.ch

San Nazzaro is a former municipality in the district of Locarno in the canton of Ticino in Switzerland.

On 25 April 2010, the former municipalities of Caviano, Contone, Gerra Gambarogno, Indemini, Magadino, Piazzogna, San Nazzaro, Sant'Abbondio and Vira Gambarogno merged in the new municipality of Gambarogno.

== History ==
San Nazzaro is first mentioned in 1258 as sancto Nazario.

In the hamlet of Vairano, cremation urns have been found which may date back to the Bronze Age cremations. Additionally, Roman era pottery and coins have also been discovered. In the hamlet of Mossana, a number of Roman graves were discovered. In the hamlet of Taverna, there used to stand a tower, which had probably been given by Frederick I Barbarossa in 1186 to the Orelli family. The tower later passed into the possession of the nobility of Locarno and was used in the control of trade in the Upper Lake Maggiore and Gambarogno river areas. Even in the Middle Ages it was a center place in the Gambarogno valley. In the 13th century, the Vicinanza meetings were held in the church square in Taverna. In 1487, the Gambarogno became independent of Locarno, and San Nazzaro became the seat of the Podestà and the court.

It was part of the parish of Vira, until it became an independent parish in 1558. The parish church of SS Nazzaro e Celso was first mentioned in 1258. It was rebuilt in 1790 in the classicist style and enlarged.

The population lived, primarily, from agriculture and grazing. The local economy was supplemented in the 15th century by emigration, mostly of bricklayers and builders, to Italy. In the second half of the 20th century, there was a strong population growth, as the village became home to a few tourist hotels and many second homes. In 2000, approximately two thirds of the workers in the municipality were commuters.

== Geography ==
Aerial view (1946)

San Nazzaro has an area, as of 1997, of 5.53 square kilometers (2.14 sq mi). Of this area, 0.65 km^{2} (0.25 sq mi) or 11.8% is used for agricultural purposes, while 4.19 km^{2} (1.62 sq mi) or 75.8% is forested. Of the rest of the land, 0.67 km^{2} (0.26 sq mi) or 12.1% is settled (buildings or roads), 0.1 km^{2} (25 acres) or 1.8% is either rivers or lakes and 0.24 km^{2} (0.093 sq mi) or 4.3% is unproductive land.

Of the built up area, housing and buildings made up 9.6% and transportation infrastructure made up 2.5%. Out of the forested land, 64.9% of the total land area is heavily forested and 3.8% is covered with orchards or small clusters of trees. Of the agricultural land, 1.4% is used for growing crops and 9.6% is used for alpine pastures. All the water in the municipality is flowing water. Of the unproductive areas, 3.3% is unproductive vegetation and 1.1% is too rocky for vegetation.

The village is located in the Locarno district, east of Lake Maggiore. It consists of the hamlets of Casenzano, Taverna and Vairano.

== Coat of arms ==
The blazon of the municipal coat of arms is Per fess argent a tower gules issaunt and quartered gules and argent.

== Demographics ==
San Nazzaro has a population (As of 2009) of 698. As of 2008, 17.2% of the population are resident foreign nationals. Over the last 10 years (1997-2007) the population has changed at a rate of 18.4%.

Most of the population (as of 2000) speaks Italian (69.7%), with German being second most common (24.8%) and French being third (1.4%). Of the Swiss national languages (as of 2000), 159 speak German, 9 people speak French, 447 people speak Italian. The remainder (26 people) speak other languages.

As of 2008, the gender distribution of the population was 48.1% male and 51.9% female. The population was made up of 276 Swiss men (39.5% of the population), and 60 (8.6%) non-Swiss men. There were 310 Swiss women (44.4%), and 52 (7.4%) non-Swiss women.

In 2008 there were 5 live births to Swiss citizens and 1 birth to non-Swiss citizens, and in same time span there were 4 deaths of Swiss citizens. Ignoring immigration and emigration, the population of Swiss citizens increased by 1 while the foreign population increased by 1. There were 2 Swiss men who emigrated from Switzerland and 1 Swiss woman who immigrated back to Switzerland. At the same time, there were 6 non-Swiss men and 2 non-Swiss women who immigrated from another country to Switzerland. The total Swiss population change in 2008 (from all sources, including moves across municipal borders) was a decrease of 2 and the non-Swiss population change was a decrease of 4 people. This represents a population growth rate of -0.8%.

The age distribution, as of 2009, in San Nazzaro is; 50 children or 7.2% of the population are between 0 and 9 years old and 62 teenagers or 8.9% are between 10 and 19. Of the adult population, 52 people or 7.4% of the population are between 20 and 29 years old. 66 people or 9.5% are between 30 and 39, 115 people or 16.5% are between 40 and 49, and 113 people or 16.2% are between 50 and 59. The senior population distribution is 115 people or 16.5% of the population are between 60 and 69 years old, 76 people or 10.9% are between 70 and 79, there are 49 people or 7.0% who are over 80.

As of 2000 the average number of residents per living room was 0.51 which is fewer people per room than the cantonal average of 0.6 per room. In this case, a room is defined as space of a housing unit of at least 4 m^{2} (43 sq ft) as normal bedrooms, dining rooms, living rooms, kitchens and habitable cellars and attics. About 58.3% of the total households were owner occupied, or in other words did not pay rent (though they may have a mortgage or a rent-to-own agreement).

As of 2000, there were 278 private households in the village, and an average of 2.1 persons per household. In 2000 there were 444 single family homes (or 75.3% of the total) out of a total of 590 inhabited buildings. There were 82 two family buildings (13.9%) and 31 multi-family buildings (5.3%). There were also 33 buildings in the village that were multipurpose buildings (used for both housing and commercial or another purpose).

The vacancy rate for the village, in 2008, was 0%. In 2000 there were 816 apartments in the village. The most common apartment size was the 3 room apartment of which there were 227. There were 42 single room apartments and 169 apartments with five or more rooms. Of these apartments, a total of 278 apartments (34.1% of the total) were permanently occupied, while 531 apartments (65.1%) were seasonally occupied and 7 apartments (0.9%) were empty. As of 2007, the construction rate of new housing units was 26.6 new units per 1000 residents.

The historical population is given in the following table:

year	population
1591	375
1683	346
1795	340
1850	477
1900	314
1950	291
2000	641

== Politics ==
In the 2007 federal election the most popular party was the FDP which received 33.86% of the vote. The next three most popular parties were the SP (21.2%), the CVP (18.43%) and the SVP (14.1%). In the federal election, a total of 216 votes were cast, and the voter turnout was 41.0%.

In the 2007 Gran Consiglio election, there were a total of 512 registered voters in San Nazzaro, of which 265 or 51.8% voted. 4 blank ballots were cast, leaving 261 valid ballots in the election. The most popular party was the PLRT which received 78 or 29.9% of the vote. The next three most popular parties were; the PS (with 49 or 18.8%), the SSI (with 46 or 17.6%) and the PPD+GenGiova (with 35 or 13.4%).

In the 2007 Consiglio di Stato election, 3 blank ballots were cast, leaving 262 valid ballots in the election. The most popular party was the PLRT which received 71 or 27.1% of the vote. The next three most popular parties were; the PS (with 53 or 20.2%), the SSI (with 50 or 19.1%) and the LEGA (with 36 or 13.7%).

== Economy ==
As of 2007, San Nazzaro had an unemployment rate of 3.04%. As of 2005, there were 15 people employed in the primary economic sector and about 3 businesses involved in this sector. 68 people were employed in the secondary sector and there were 10 businesses in this sector. 156 people were employed in the tertiary sector, with 24 businesses in this sector. There were 253 residents of the village who were employed in some capacity, of which females made up 43.9% of the workforce.

In 2000, there were 256 workers who commuted into the village and 128 workers who commuted away. The village is a net importer of workers, with about 2.0 workers entering the village for every one leaving. About 34.0% of the workforce coming into San Nazzaro are coming from outside Switzerland. Of the working population, 4.3% used public transportation to get to work, and 59.3% used a private car. As of 2009, there were 3 hotels in San Nazzaro with a total of 81 rooms and 184 beds.

== Religion ==
From the 2000 census, 430 or 67.1% were Roman Catholic, while 93 or 14.5% belonged to the Swiss Reformed Church. There are 93 individuals (or about 14.51% of the population) who belong to another church (not listed on the census), and 25 individuals (or about 3.90% of the population) did not answer the question.

== Education ==
The Gambarogno municipal preschool/primary school system is headquartered in San Nazzaro, and the town has a primary school site.

The municipal library, Biblioteca comunale Gambarogno in San Nazzaro, opened in 2014. There is also a toy library (ludoteca) in San Nazzaro, which opened in 1997.

The entire Swiss population is generally well educated. In San Nazzaro about 74% of the population (between age 25-64) have completed either non-mandatory upper secondary education or additional higher education (either University or a Fachhochschule).

In San Nazzaro there were a total of 94 students (as of 2009). The Ticino education system provides up to three years of non-mandatory kindergarten and in San Nazzaro there were 8 children in kindergarten. The primary school program lasts for five years and includes both a standard school and a special school. In the village, 33 students attended the standard primary schools and 1 student attended the special school. In the lower secondary school system, students either attend a two-year middle school followed by a two-year pre-apprenticeship or they attend a four-year program to prepare for higher education. There were 29 students in the two-year middle school, while 9 students were in the four-year advanced program.

The upper secondary school includes several options, but at the end of the upper secondary program, a student will be prepared to enter a trade or to continue on to a university or college. In Ticino, vocational students may either attend school while working on their internship or apprenticeship (which takes three or four years) or may attend school followed by an internship or apprenticeship (which takes one year as a full-time student or one and a half to two years as a part-time student). There were 2 vocational students who were attending school full-time and 10 who attend part-time.

The professional program lasts three years and prepares a student for a job in engineering, nursing, computer science, business, tourism and similar fields. There were 2 students in the professional program.

As of 2000, there were 15 students in San Nazzaro who came from another village, while 39 residents attended schools outside the village.
