= Piazzogna =

- Former municipality
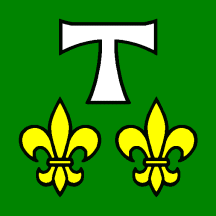
- Flag Coat of arms
- Location of Piazzogna
- Location within Switzerland Location within Canton of Ticino
- Coordinates: 46°08′N 8°49′E
- Country: Switzerland
- Canton: Ticino
- District: Locarno
- Municipality: Gambarogno

Area
  - Total: 3.87 km^{2} (1.49 sq mi)
- Elevation: 365 m (1,198 ft)

Population (December 2004)
  - Total: 397
  - Density: 103/km^{2} (266/sq mi)
- Time zone: UTC+01:00 (CET)
  - Summer (DST): UTC+02:00 (CEST)
- Postal code: 6579
- SFOS number: 5123
- ISO 3166 code: CH-TI
- Surrounded by: Indemini, Locarno, Minusio, Muralto, San Nazzaro, Vira (Gambarogno)
- Website: www.piazzogna.ch

Piazzogna is a former municipality in the district of Locarno in the canton of Ticino in Switzerland.

On 25 April 2010, the former municipalities of Caviano, Contone, Gerra Gambarogno, Indemini, Magadino, Piazzogna, San Nazzaro, Sant'Abbondio and Vira Gambarogno merged in the new municipality of Gambarogno.

== History ==
Piazzogna is first mentioned in 1337 as Piazognia. It was mentioned again between 1542 and 1546 as part of the award given by the local bailiff during arbitration. The arbitration dealt with the rights of neighboring villages to use alpine meadows. Piazzogna belonged first to the municipality and parish of Vira, but by 1704 it had become an independent municipality. However, it didn't become an independent political municipality until 1803.

The original village church of S. Antonio Abate was probably built in the Middle Ages in the romanesque style. However it fell into ruin and collapsed between the 17th and 18th centuries. The parish built a new church in 1752. In the wake of the village's independence from the parish of Vira in 1837, this church was expanded several times in the 19th century.

The hamlet of Alabardia, once part of the parish of San Nazzaro, became widely known in 1783 as the center of Horace-Bénédict de Saussure barometric experiments conducted around Lake Maggiore.

== Geography ==
Piazzogna has an area, as of 1997, of 3.87 square kilometers (1.49 sq mi). Of this area, 0.38 km^{2} (0.15 sq mi) or 9.8% is used for agricultural purposes, while 3.11 km^{2} (1.20 sq mi) or 80.4% is forested. Of the rest of the land, 0.26 km^{2} (0.10 sq mi) or 6.7% is settled (buildings or roads), 0.01 km^{2} (2.5 acres) or 0.3% is either rivers or lakes and 0.24 km^{2} (0.093 sq mi) or 6.2% is unproductive land.

Of the built up area, housing and buildings made up 4.4% and transportation infrastructure made up 2.1%. Out of the forested land, 57.9% of the total land area is heavily forested, while 19.9% is covered in small trees and shrubbery and 2.6% is covered with orchards or small clusters of trees. Of the agricultural land, 4.4% is used for growing crops and 4.4% is used for alpine pastures. All the water in the municipality is in lakes. Of the unproductive areas, 5.9% is unproductive vegetation.

The village is located in the Locarno district, on a terrace above the Gambarogno valley.

== Coat of arms ==
The blazon of the municipal coat of arms is Vert a tau cross patte couped argent and in base two fleurs-de-lis or.

== Demographics ==
Piazzogna has a population (as of December 2004) of 397. As of 2008, 14.7% of the population are resident foreign nationals. Over the last 10 years (1997–2007) the population has changed at a rate of 7.8%.

Most of the population (as of 2000) speaks Italian (80.7%), with German being second most common (16.3%) and French being third (1.1%). Of the Swiss national languages (as of 2000), 59 speak German, 4 people speak French, 292 people speak Italian. The remainder (7 people) speak another language.

As of 2008, the gender distribution of the population was 47.7% male and 52.3% female. The population was made up of 156 Swiss men (39.8% of the population), and 31 (7.9%) non-Swiss men. There were 186 Swiss women (47.4%), and 19 (4.8%) non-Swiss women.

In 2008 there were 4 live births to Swiss citizens, 3 deaths of Swiss citizens and 2 non-Swiss citizen deaths. Ignoring immigration and emigration, the population of Swiss citizens increased by 1 while the foreign population decreased by 2. There was 1 non-Swiss man and 1 non-Swiss woman who immigrated from another country to Switzerland. The total Swiss population change in 2008 (from all sources, including moves across municipal borders) was an increase of 12 and the non-Swiss population change was an increase of 8 people. This represents a population growth rate of 5.3%.

The age distribution, as of 2009, in Piazzogna is; 35 children or 8.9% of the population are between 0 and 9 years old and 32 teenagers or 8.2% are between 10 and 19. Of the adult population, 43 people or 11.0% of the population are between 20 and 29 years old. 55 people or 14.0% are between 30 and 39, 73 people or 18.6% are between 40 and 49, and 45 people or 11.5% are between 50 and 59. The senior population distribution is 48 people or 12.2% of the population are between 60 and 69 years old, 41 people or 10.5% are between 70 and 79, there are 20 people or 5.1% who are over 80.

As of 2000 the average number of residents per living room was 0.58 which is about equal to the cantonal average of 0.6 per room. In this case, a room is defined as space of a housing unit of at least 4 m^{2} (43 sq ft) as normal bedrooms, dining rooms, living rooms, kitchens and habitable cellars and attics. About 58.5% of the total households were owner occupied, or in other words did not pay rent (though they may have a mortgage or a rent-to-own agreement).

As of 2000, there were 160 private households in the village, and an average of 2.3 persons per household. In 2000 there were 209 single family homes (or 70.6% of the total) out of a total of 296 inhabited buildings. There were 50 two family buildings (16.9%) and 19 multi-family buildings (6.4%). There were also 18 buildings in the village that were multipurpose buildings (used for both housing and commercial or another purpose).

The vacancy rate for the village, in 2008, was 0%. In 2000 there were 434 apartments in the village. The most common apartment size was the 3 room apartment of which there were 141. There were 36 single room apartments and 59 apartments with five or more rooms. Of these apartments, a total of 159 apartments (36.6% of the total) were permanently occupied, while 273 apartments (62.9%) were seasonally occupied and 2 apartments (0.5%) were empty. As of 2007, the construction rate of new housing units was 2.7 new units per 1000 residents.

The historical population is given in the following table:

year	population
1669	20 Hearths
1808	157
1850	221
1900	152
1950	185
1990	264
2000	362

== Politics ==
In the 2007 federal election the most popular party was the FDP which received 29.28% of the vote. The next three most popular parties were the SP (21.48%), the CVP (19.63%) and the Ticino League (16.92%). In the federal election, a total of 123 votes were cast, and the voter turnout was 42.1%.

In the 2007 Gran Consiglio election, there were a total of 303 registered voters in Piazzogna, of which 197 or 65.0% voted. 5 blank ballots and 1 null ballot were cast, leaving 191 valid ballots in the election. The most popular party was the PLRT which received 44 or 23.0% of the vote. The next three most popular parties were; the PS (with 41 or 21.5%), the SSI (with 40 or 20.9%) and the LEGA (with 29 or 15.2%).

In the 2007 Consiglio di Stato election, 1 null ballot was cast, leaving 198 valid ballots in the election. The most popular party was the LEGA which received 64 or 32.3% of the vote. The next three most popular parties were; the PS (with 44 or 22.2%), the PLRT (with 33 or 16.7%) and the SSI (with 30 or 15.2%).

== Economy ==
As of 2007, Piazzogna had an unemployment rate of 4.04%. As of 2005, there were 3 people employed in the primary economic sector and about 2 businesses involved in this sector. 19 people were employed in the secondary sector and there were 9 businesses in this sector. 72 people were employed in the tertiary sector, with 12 businesses in this sector. There were 156 residents of the village who were employed in some capacity, of which females made up 37.8% of the workforce.

In 2000, there were 33 workers who commuted into the village and 98 workers who commuted away. The village is a net exporter of workers, with about 3.0 workers leaving the village for every one entering. About 30.3% of the workforce coming into Piazzogna are coming from outside Switzerland. Of the working population, 5.1% used public transportation to get to work, and 64.1% used a private car. As of 2009, there was one hotel in Piazzogna.

== Religion ==
From the 2000 census, 281 or 77.6% were Roman Catholic, while 28 or 7.7% belonged to the Swiss Reformed Church. There are 41 individuals (or about 11.33% of the population) who belong to another church (not listed on the census), and 12 individuals (or about 3.31% of the population) did not answer the question.

== Education ==
The entire Swiss population is generally well educated. In Piazzogna about 71.9% of the population (between age 25 and 64) have completed either non-mandatory upper secondary education or additional higher education (either University or a Fachhochschule).

In Piazzogna there were a total of 50 students (as of 2009). The Ticino education system provides up to three years of non-mandatory kindergarten and in Piazzogna there were 8 children in kindergarten. The primary school program lasts for five years. In the village, 17 students attended the standard primary schools. In the lower secondary school system, students either attend a two-year middle school followed by a two-year pre-apprenticeship or they attend a four-year program to prepare for higher education. There were 12 students in the two-year middle school, while 5 students were in the four-year advanced program.

The upper secondary school includes several options, but at the end of the upper secondary program, a student will be prepared to enter a trade or to continue on to a university or college. In Ticino, vocational students may either attend school while working on their internship or apprenticeship (which takes three or four years) or may attend school followed by an internship or apprenticeship (which takes one year as a full-time student or one and a half to two years as a part-time student). There were 2 vocational students who were attending school full-time and 6 who attend part-time.

As of 2000, there were 41 students from Piazzogna who attended schools outside the village.
