= Gerra (Gambarogno) =

- Former municipality
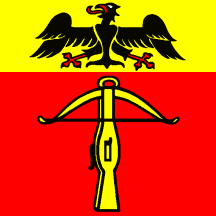
- Flag Coat of arms
- Location of Gerra (Gambarogno)
- Location within Switzerland Location within Canton of Ticino
- Coordinates: 46°07′N 8°47′E
- Country: Switzerland
- Canton: Ticino
- District: Locarno
- Municipality: Gambarogno

Area
  - Total: 3.14 km^{2} (1.21 sq mi)
- Elevation: 216 m (709 ft)

Population (December 2009)
  - Total: 305
  - Density: 97.1/km^{2} (252/sq mi)
- Time zone: UTC+01:00 (CET)
  - Summer (DST): UTC+02:00 (CEST)
- Postal code: 6576
- SFOS number: 5106
- ISO 3166 code: CH-TI
- Surrounded by: Brissago, Caviano, Indemini, Pino sulla Sponda del Lago Maggiore (IT-VA), Ronco sopra Ascona, San Nazzaro, Sant'Abbondio
- Website: SFSO statistics

Gerra (Gambarogno) is a former municipality in the district of Locarno in the canton of Ticino in Switzerland.

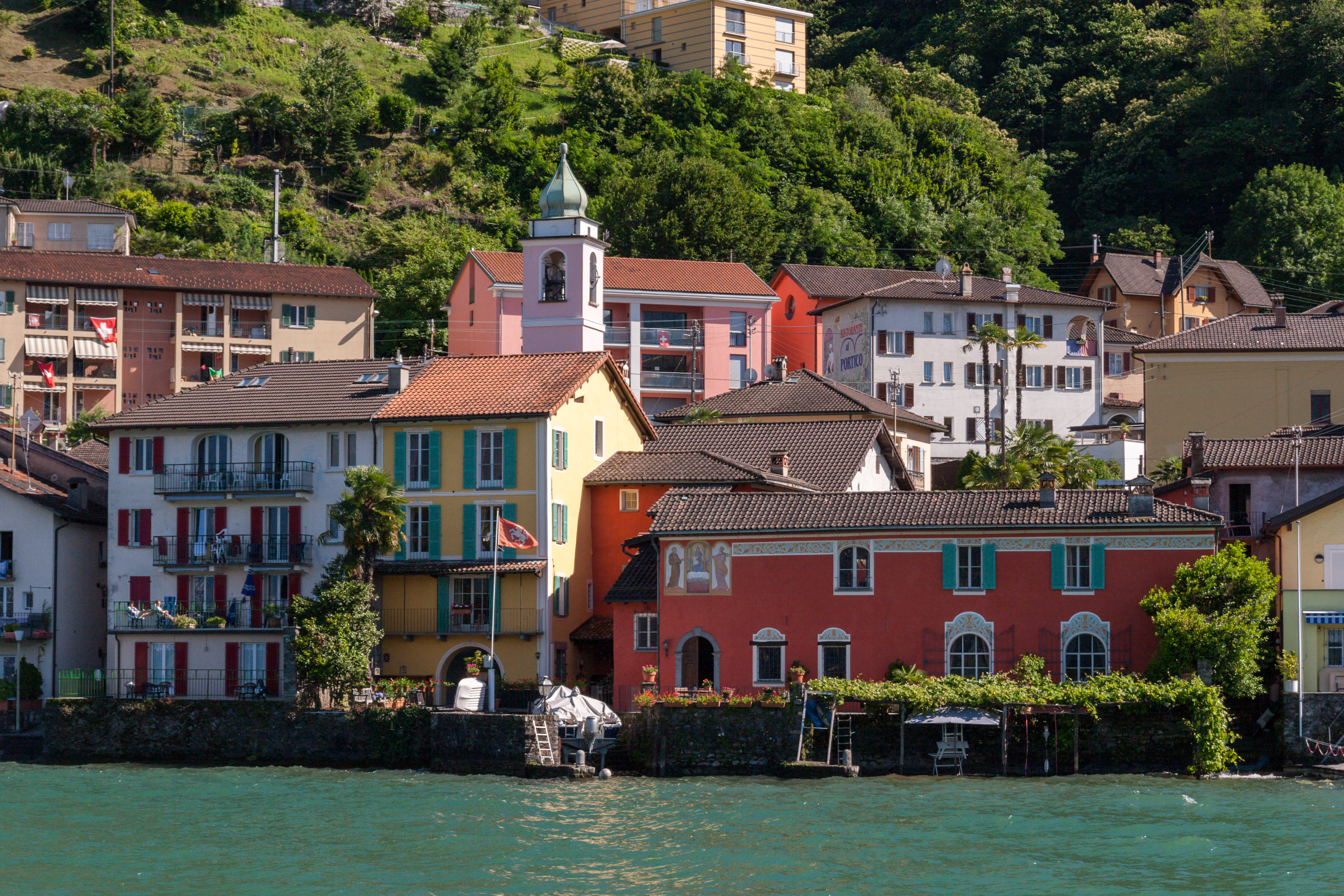
Gerra (Gambarogno) /Lago Maggiore

On 25 April 2010, the former municipalities of Caviano, Contone, Gerra Gambarogno, Indemini, Magadino, Piazzogna, San Nazzaro, Sant'Abbondio and Vira Gambarogno merged in the new municipality of Gambarogno.

== History ==
The name Gerra is probably from the 18th century, when the village of Ronco de Martignoni (which was first mentioned in 1591) expanded into the Gerra river delta and the shores of Lake Maggiore.

Gerra was part of the old Vicinanza of Gambarogno. In the 16th century, Ronco de Martignoni, Ronco di Sopra and Scimiana joined to form an independent municipality. This municipality is listed in the register of lands of the parish of S. Abbondio from 1596. In 1744, the St. Rochus and Sebastian parish church was built.

Of the three inhabited settlement cores, Scimiana has remained nearly unchanged. The network of narrow streets and typical Gambarogno style alleys have been preserved, while most of the wooden balconies are gone and the fishermen's houses have disappeared. At the beginning of the 21st century more than half the working population is employed in the services sector, and most work outside of the municipality.

== Geography ==
Aerial view (1946)

Gerra has an area, as of 1997, of 3.14 square kilometers (1.21 sq mi). Of this area, 0.31 km^{2} (0.12 sq mi) or 9.9% is used for agricultural purposes, while 2.64 km^{2} (1.02 sq mi) or 84.1% is forested. Of the rest of the land, 0.28 km^{2} (0.11 sq mi) or 8.9% is settled (buildings or roads), 0.06 km^{2} (15 acres) or 1.9% is either rivers or lakes and 0.07 km^{2} (17 acres) or 2.2% is unproductive land.

Of the built up area, housing and buildings made up 6.7% and transportation infrastructure made up 1.9%. Out of the forested land, 80.6% of the total land area is heavily forested and 3.5% is covered with orchards or small clusters of trees. Of the agricultural land, 2.2% is used for growing crops and 6.7% is used for alpine pastures. Of the water in the village, 1.3% is in lakes and 0.6% is in rivers and streams. Of the unproductive areas, 1.6% is unproductive vegetation.

The village is located in the Locarno district. It consists of the villages of Ronco, Riva and Scimiana.

== Coat of arms ==
The blazon of the municipal coat of arms is Gules a crossbow or and in a chief of the last an eagle displayed sable langued, beaked and membered of the first. The coat of arms come from the arms of the Balestra family. This is an example of canting as Balestra, means arbalest or crossbow.

== Demographics ==
Gerra has a population (as of December 2009) of 305. As of 2008, 16.5% of the population are resident foreign nationals. Over the last 10 years (1997–2007) the population has changed at a rate of 9%.

Most of the population (as of 2000) speaks Italian (67.3%), with German being second most common (28.3%) and French being third (1.6%). Of the Swiss national languages (as of 2000), 72 speak German, 4 people speak French, 171 people speak Italian, and 1 person speaks Romansh. The remainder (6 people) speak another language.

As of 2008, the gender distribution of the population was 49.5% male and 50.5% female. The population was made up of 123 Swiss men (40.3% of the population), and 28 (9.2%) non-Swiss men. There were 134 Swiss women (43.9%), and 20 (6.6%) non-Swiss women.

In 2008 there were 4 live births to Swiss citizens and were 5 deaths of Swiss citizens. Ignoring immigration and emigration, the population of Swiss citizens decreased by 1 while the foreign population remained the same. There was 1 non-Swiss man and 1 non-Swiss woman who immigrated from another country to Switzerland. The total Swiss population change in 2008 (from all sources, including moves across municipal borders) was an increase of 1 and there was no non-Swiss population change. This represents a population growth rate of 0.3%.

The age distribution, as of 2009, in Gerra is; 28 children or 9.2% of the population are between 0 and 9 years old and 28 teenagers or 9.2% are between 10 and 19. Of the adult population, 17 people or 5.6% of the population are between 20 and 29 years old. 33 people or 10.8% are between 30 and 39, 47 people or 15.4% are between 40 and 49, and 46 people or 15.1% are between 50 and 59. The senior population distribution is 53 people or 17.4% of the population are between 60 and 69 years old, 31 people or 10.2% are between 70 and 79, there are 22 people or 7.2% who are over 80.

As of 2000 the average number of residents per living room was 0.54 which is fewer people per room than the cantonal average of 0.6 per room. In this case, a room is defined as space of a housing unit of at least 4 m^{2} (43 sq ft) as normal bedrooms, dining rooms, living rooms, kitchens and habitable cellars and attics. About 50.4% of the total households were owner occupied, or in other words did not pay rent (though they may have a mortgage or a rent-to-own agreement).

As of 2000, there were 127 private households in the village, and an average of 2. persons per household. In 2000 there were 241 single family homes (or 75.8% of the total) out of a total of 318 inhabited buildings. There were 32 two family buildings (10.1%) and 31 multi-family buildings (9.7%). There were also 14 buildings in the village that were multipurpose buildings (used for both housing and commercial or another purpose).

The vacancy rate for the village, in 2008, was 0%. In 2000 there were 475 apartments in the village. The most common apartment size was the 3 room apartment of which there were 126. There were 39 single room apartments and 76 apartments with five or more rooms. Of these apartments, a total of 123 apartments (25.9% of the total) were permanently occupied, while 349 apartments (73.5%) were seasonally occupied and 3 apartments (0.6%) were empty. As of 2007, the construction rate of new housing units was 0 new units per 1000 residents.

The historical population is given in the following table:

year	population
1591	27 Hearths
1669	57
1801	405
1850	651
1900	451
1950	330

== Politics ==
In the 2007 federal election the most popular party was the FDP which received 33.16% of the vote. The next three most popular parties were the SP (23.37%), the CVP (18.8%) and the SVP (11.1%). In the federal election, a total of 101 votes were cast, and the voter turnout was 42.6%.

In the 2007 Gran Consiglio election, there were a total of 224 registered voters in Gerra, of which 121 or 54.0% voted. The most popular party was the PLRT which received 41 or 33.9% of the vote. The next three most popular parties were; the SSI (with 22 or 18.2%), the PS (with 21 or 17.4%) and the LEGA (with 17 or 14.0%).

In the 2007 Consiglio di Stato election, 2 blank ballots were cast, leaving 119 valid ballots in the election. The most popular party was the PLRT which received 36 or 30.3% of the vote. The next three most popular parties were; the LEGA (with 22 or 18.5%), the LEGA (with 22 or 18.5%) and the PS (with 21 or 17.6%).

== Economy ==
As of 2007, Gerra had an unemployment rate of 2.93%. As of 2005, there were 2 people employed in the primary economic sector and about 1 business involved in this sector. 5 people were employed in the secondary sector and there was 1 business in this sector. 51 people were employed in the tertiary sector, with 13 businesses in this sector. There were 106 residents of the village who were employed in some capacity, of which females made up 37.7% of the workforce.

In 2000, there were 22 workers who commuted into the village and 70 workers who commuted away. The village is a net exporter of workers, with about 3.2 workers leaving the village for every one entering. About 31.8% of the workforce coming into Gerra are coming from outside Switzerland. Of the working population, 6.6% used public transportation to get to work, and 61.3% used a private car. As of 2009, there were 2 hotels in Gerra.

== Religion ==
From the 2000 census, 176 or 69.3% were Roman Catholic, while 40 or 15.7% belonged to the Swiss Reformed Church. There are 33 individuals (or about 12.99% of the population) who belong to another church (not listed on the census), and 5 individuals (or about 1.97% of the population) did not answer the question.

== Education ==
There is a municipal preschool site in Gerra.

The entire Swiss population is generally well educated. In Gerra about 81.3% of the population (between age 25 and 64) have completed either non-mandatory upper secondary education or additional higher education (either University or a Fachhochschule).

In Gerra there were a total of 43 students (as of 2009). The Ticino education system provides up to three years of non-mandatory kindergarten and in Gerra there were 3 children in kindergarten. The primary school program lasts for five years and includes both a standard school and a special school. In the village, 17 students attended the standard primary schools and 1 student attended the special school. In the lower secondary school system, students either attend a two-year middle school followed by a two-year pre-apprenticeship or they attend a four-year program to prepare for higher education. There were 10 students in the two-year middle school, while 6 students were in the four-year advanced program.

The upper secondary school includes several options, but at the end of the upper secondary program, a student will be prepared to enter a trade or to continue on to a university or college. In Ticino, vocational students may either attend school while working on their internship or apprenticeship (which takes three or four years) or may attend school followed by an internship or apprenticeship (which takes one year as a full-time student or one and a half to two years as a part-time student). There were 2 vocational students who were attending school full-time and 4 who attend part-time.

As of 2000, there were 24 students from Gerra who attended schools outside the village.
