= Magadino =

- Former municipality
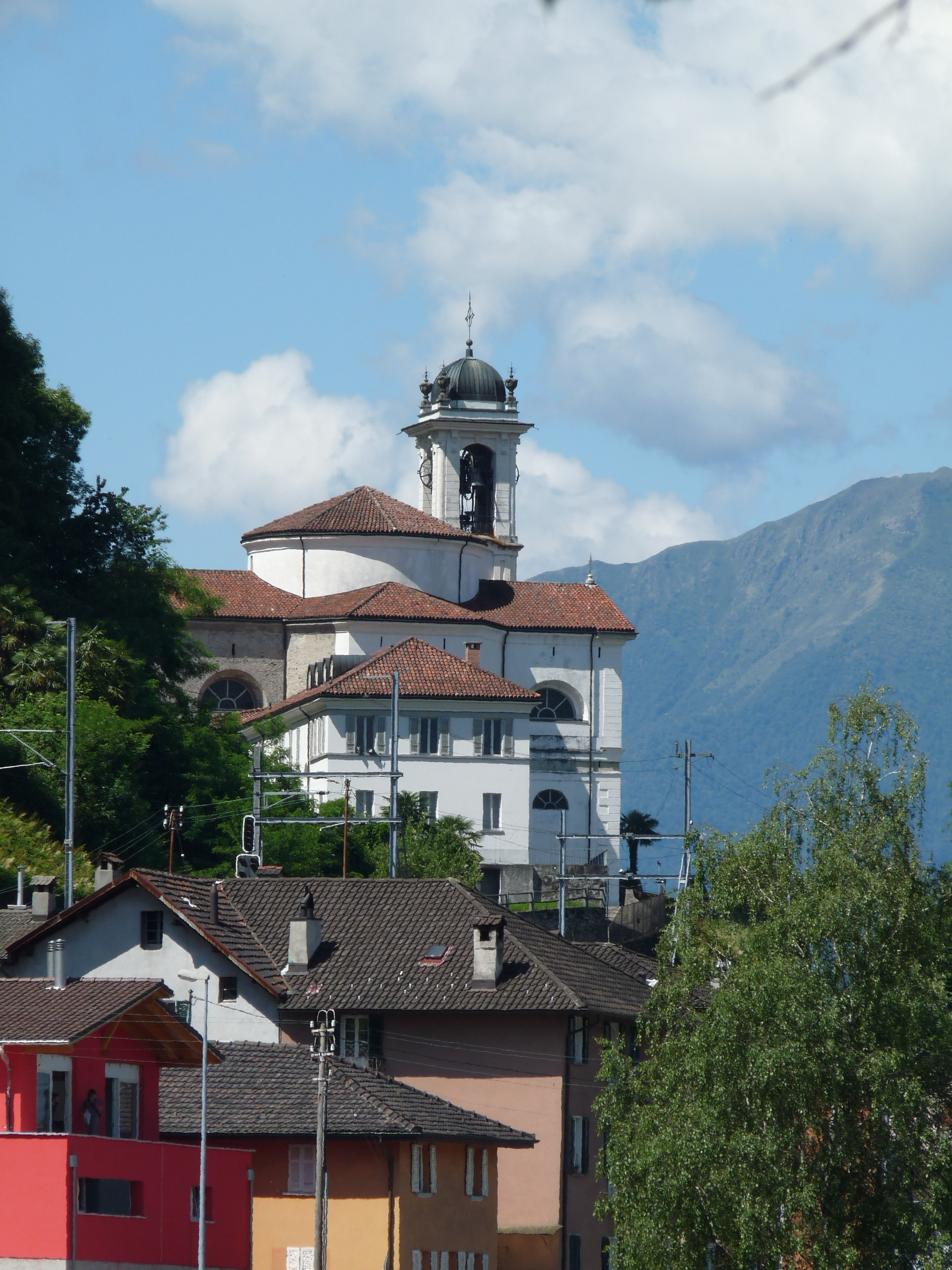
- Magadino village church

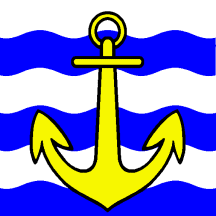
- Flag Coat of arms
- Location of Magadino
- Location within Switzerland Location within Canton of Ticino
- Coordinates: 46°09′N 8°51′E
- Country: Switzerland
- Canton: Ticino
- District: Locarno
- Municipality: Gambarogno

Area
  - Total: 7.23 km^{2} (2.79 sq mi)
- Elevation: 196 m (643 ft)

Population (December 2007)
  - Total: 1,604
  - Density: 222/km^{2} (575/sq mi)
- Time zone: UTC+01:00 (CET)
  - Summer (DST): UTC+02:00 (CEST)
- Postal code: 6573
- SFOS number: 5116
- ISO 3166 code: CH-TI
- Surrounded by: Contone, Locarno, Minusio, Rivera, Tenero-Contra, Vira (Gambarogno)
- Website: SFSO statistics

Magadino (Lombard: Magadign) is a former municipality in the district of Locarno in the canton of Ticino in Switzerland.

On 25 April 2010, the former municipalities of Caviano, Contone, Gerra Gambarogno, Indemini, Magadino, Piazzogna, San Nazzaro, Sant'Abbondio and Vira Gambarogno merged in the new municipality of Gambarogno.

== History ==
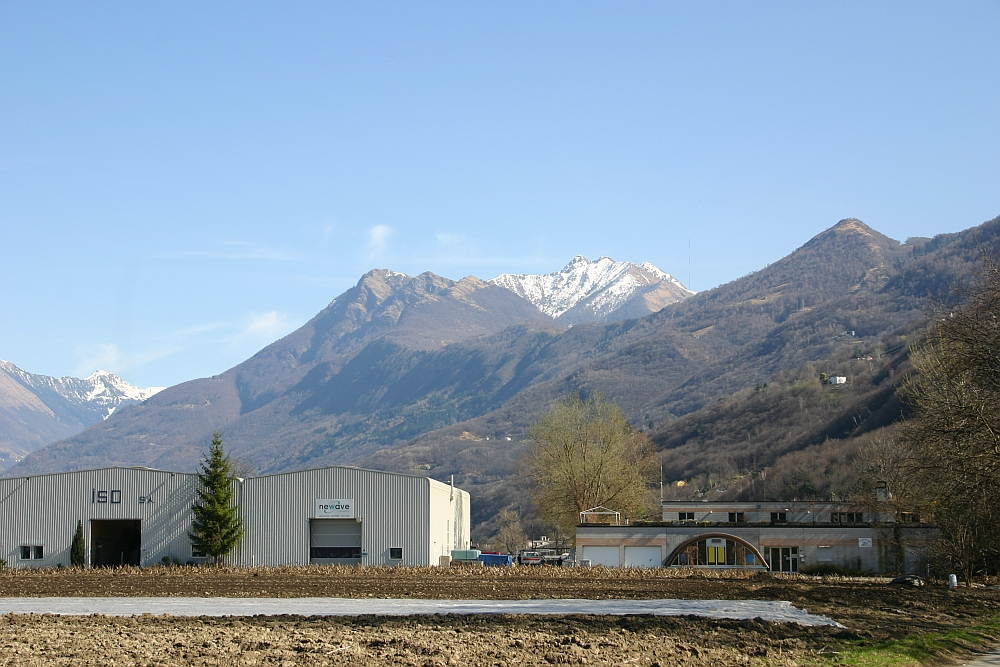
Luserte in Quartino, a neighborhood in Magadino

Magadino is first mentioned in 1254 as de Magadino. It was also previously known, in German, as Megadin though this name is no longer used.

During the Late Middle Ages the village was mentioned when certain feudal rights were transferred from the Bishop of Como to the Capitanei of Locarno transferred. Until 1342, these rights included the right to collect tolls on goods traveling through the area. The village of Quartino was, in the 11th to 16th century, a Benedictine priory. The priory of St. George belonged to the abbey of S. Benigno di Fruttuaria in Piedmont, then to S. Gemolo di Ganna in Lombardy. In the 17th century the monastic estates came to the hospital in Locarno.

Together with the villages of Quartino and Orgnana, Magadino belonged to the parish of S. Pietro in Vira, until it became an independent parish in 1846. The church of San Carlo was built in 1844–46.

The Codice delle strade di Como (1335) mentions a tower in Magadino, though no trace of the tower has been found. A castle is also mentioned in a chronicle from the 17th century, but it is also lost. The chronicle says it was built in 1365 on the orders of Galeazzo Visconti for the inhabitants of Locarno and destroyed in 1518 by the Swiss.

Magadino was a major port and an important customs station at the transit route north from Lombardy to the cities of the Alps, and its importance grew in 1515 after the collapse of the bridge over the Ticino river at Bellinzona. With the introduction of regular steamship traffic (1826) and the opening of the road over the Gotthard Pass (1830) Magadino became a stop on the coach routes. Many new warehouses, hotels and restaurants were built, some of which are still visible today. The decline of the port began with the opening of the railway lines to Locarno (1874) and Luino (1882). The town stagnated between the 1880s until the 1960s. In 2000, the majority of the population worked outside the village. In 2005, almost half of the jobs were in the services sector.

== Geography ==
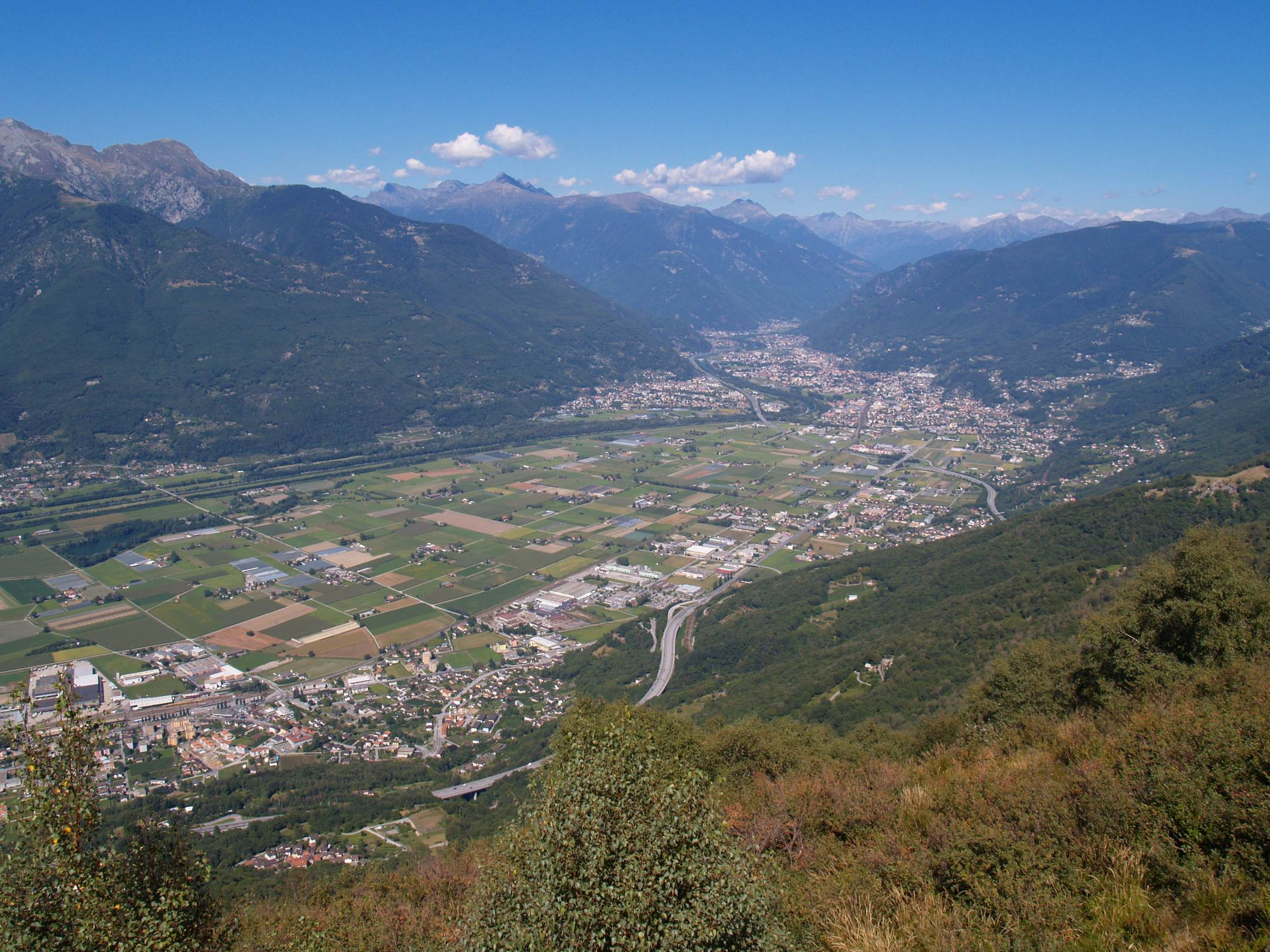
Magadino from the air

Aerial view by Walter Mittelholzer (1933)

Magadino has an area, as of 1997, of 7.23 square kilometers (2.79 sq mi). Of this area, 2.28 km^{2} (0.88 sq mi) or 31.5% is used for agricultural purposes, while 4.19 km^{2} (1.62 sq mi) or 58.0% is forested. Of the rest of the land, 1.19 km^{2} (0.46 sq mi) or 16.5% is settled (buildings or roads), 0.14 km^{2} (35 acres) or 1.9% is either rivers or lakes and 0.13 km^{2} (32 acres) or 1.8% is unproductive land.

Of the built up area, industrial buildings made up 2.5% of the total area while housing and buildings made up 8.0% and transportation infrastructure made up 4.7%. Out of the forested land, 55.9% of the total land area is heavily forested and 2.1% is covered with orchards or small clusters of trees. Of the agricultural land, 22.0% is used for growing crops, while 1.5% is used for orchards or vine crops and 8.0% is used for alpine pastures. Of the water in the village, 1.4% is in lakes and 0.6% is in rivers and streams. Of the unproductive areas, 1.8% is unproductive vegetation.

The village is located in the Locarno district, on the banks of the Riviera del Gambarogno. The municipality includes a nature preserve. The Bolle marsh between the mouths of the Verzasca and Ticino rivers. It consists of the village of Magadino and the hamlets of Quartino and Orgnana.

The neighboring villages are Contone and Vira (Gambarogno).

== Coat of arms ==
The blazon of the municipal coat of arms is Barry wavy of six argent and azure overall an anchor or. The anchor refers to Magadino's harbor on Lake Maggiore.

== Demographics ==
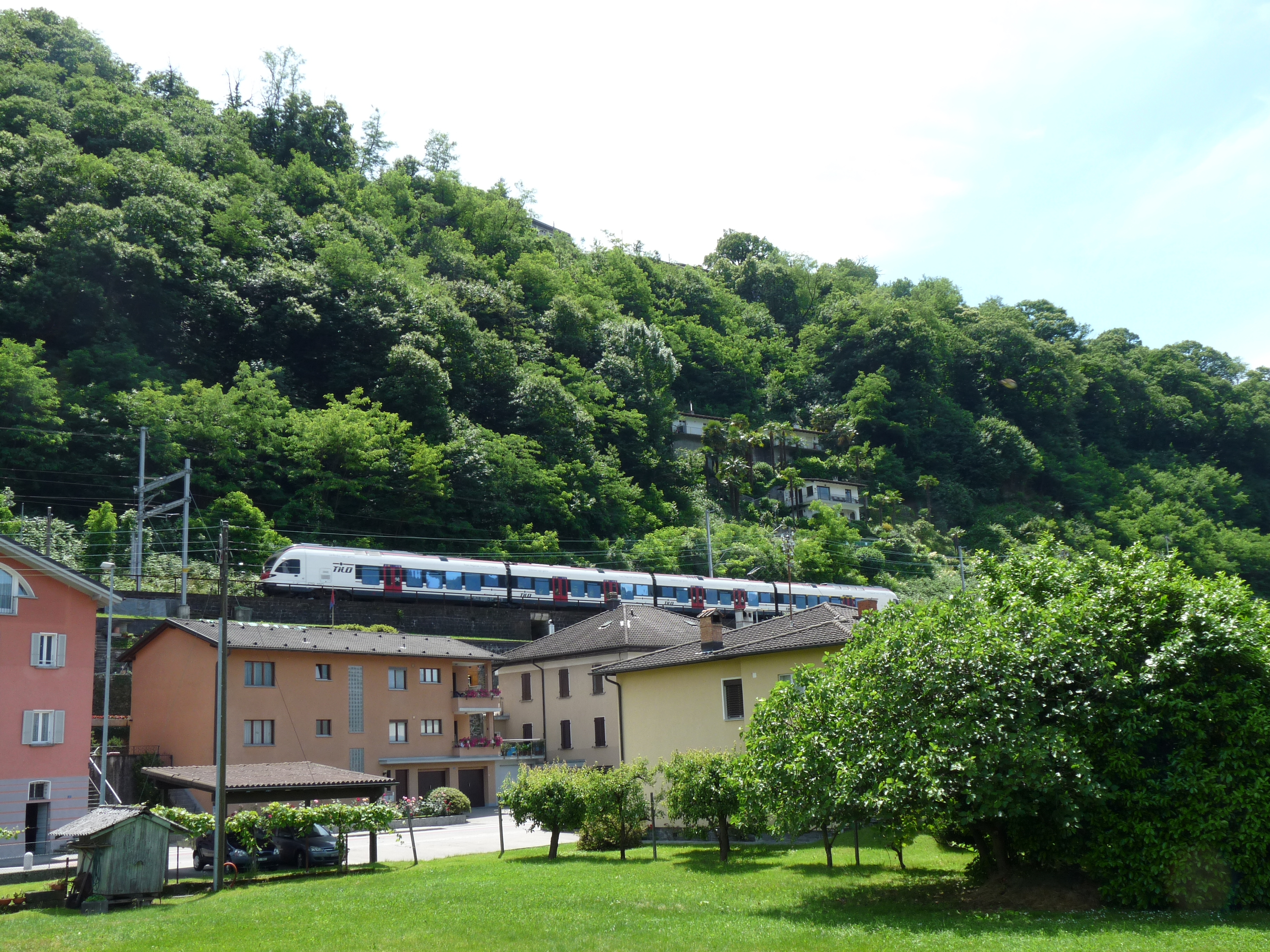
Train line near Magadino

As of December 2007, Magadino had a population of 1,604. As of 2008, 21.2% of the population are resident foreign nationals. Over the last 10 years (1997-2007) the population has changed at a rate of 5.9%.

Most of the population (as of 2000) speaks Italian (82.0%), with German being second most common (11.3%) and French being third (1.5%). Of the Swiss national languages (as of 2000), 170 speak German, 23 people speak French, 1,229 people speak Italian. The remainder (77 people) speak another language.

As of 2008, the gender distribution of the population was 48.0% male and 52.0% female. The population was made up of 598 Swiss men (35.4% of the population), and 212 (12.6%) non-Swiss men. There were 712 Swiss women (42.2%), and 166 (9.8%) non-Swiss women.

In 2008 there were 14 live births to Swiss citizens and 6 births to non-Swiss citizens, and in same time span there were 11 deaths of Swiss citizens and 1 non-Swiss citizen death. Ignoring immigration and emigration, the population of Swiss citizens increased by 3 while the foreign population increased by 5. There were 3 Swiss women who immigrated back to Switzerland. At the same time, there were 11 non-Swiss men and 13 non-Swiss women who immigrated from another country to Switzerland. The total Swiss population change in 2008 (from all sources, including moves across municipal borders) was an increase of 13 and the non-Swiss population change was an increase of 25 people. This represents a population growth rate of 2.4%.

The age distribution, as of 2009, in Magadino is; 166 children or 9.8% of the population are between 0 and 9 years old and 189 teenagers or 11.2% are between 10 and 19. Of the adult population, 162 people or 9.6% of the population are between 20 and 29 years old. 238 people or 14.1% are between 30 and 39, 316 people or 18.7% are between 40 and 49, and 222 people or 13.2% are between 50 and 59. The senior population distribution is 176 people or 10.4% of the population are between 60 and 69 years old, 134 people or 7.9% are between 70 and 79, there are 85 people or 5.0% who are over 80.

As of 2000 the average number of residents per living room was 0.58 which is about equal to the cantonal average of 0.6 per room. In this case, a room is defined as space of a housing unit of at least 4 m^{2} (43 sq ft) as normal bedrooms, dining rooms, living rooms, kitchens and habitable cellars and attics. About 51.1% of the total households were owner occupied, or in other words did not pay rent (though they may have a mortgage or a rent-to-own agreement).

As of 2000, there were 677 private households in the village, and an average of 2.2 persons per household. In 2000 there were 514 single family homes (or 73.2% of the total) out of a total of 702 inhabited buildings. There were 99 two family buildings (14.1%) and 64 multi-family buildings (9.1%). There were also 25 buildings in the village that were multipurpose buildings (used for both housing and commercial or another purpose).

The vacancy rate for the village, in 2008, was 0.35%. In 2000 there were 1,075 apartments in the village. The most common apartment size was the 3 room apartment of which there were 336. There were 44 single room apartments and 188 apartments with five or more rooms. Of these apartments, a total of 671 apartments (62.4% of the total) were permanently occupied, while 377 apartments (35.1%) were seasonally occupied and 27 apartments (2.5%) were empty. As of 2007, the construction rate of new housing units was 1.9 new units per 1000 residents.

The historical population is given in the following table:

| year | population |
|---|---|
| 1850 | 586 |
| 1880 | 901 |
| 1900 | 725 |
| 1950 | 821 |
| 1990 | 1,228 |
| 2000 | 1,449 |
| 2007 | 1,604 |

== Heritage sites of national significance ==
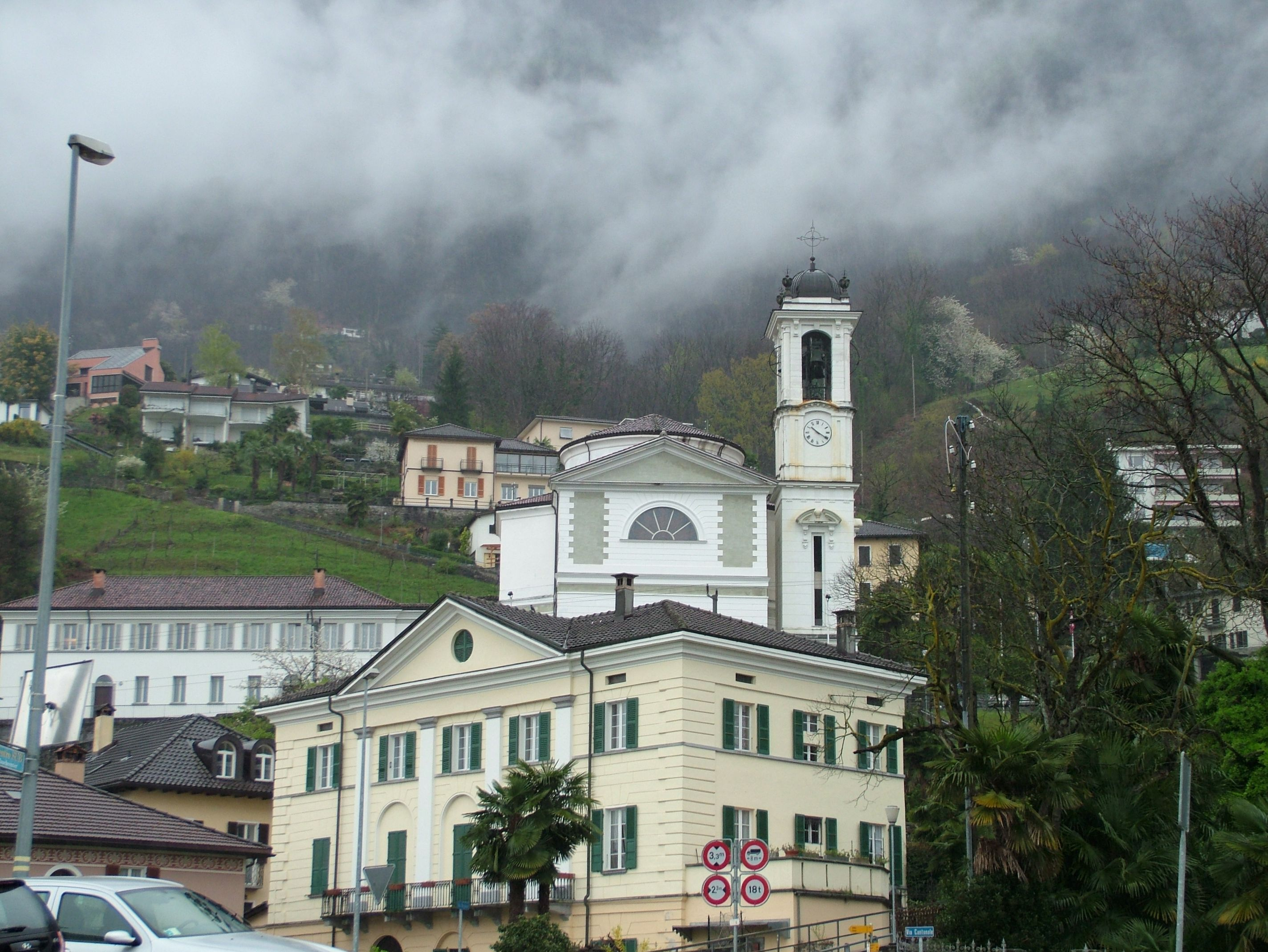
Church of S. Carlo

The Complesso di S. Carlo, a church and parish house, and the Villa Ghisler are listed as Swiss heritage site of national significance.

== Politics ==
In the 2007 federal election the most popular party was the FDP which received 34.26% of the vote. The next three most popular parties were the CVP (20.18%), the SP (18.25%) and the Ticino League (14.36%). In the federal election, a total of 427 votes were cast, and the voter turnout was 39.9%.

In the 2007 Gran Consiglio election, there were a total of 1,065 registered voters in Magadino, of which 645 or 60.6% voted. 6 blank ballots and 2 null ballots were cast, leaving 637 valid ballots in the election. The most popular party was the PLRT which received 171 or 26.8% of the vote. The next three most popular parties were; the LEGA (with 117 or 18.4%), the LEGA (with 117 or 18.4%) and the PS (with 100 or 15.7%).

In the 2007 Consiglio di Stato election, 2 blank ballots and 4 null ballots were cast, leaving 639 valid ballots in the election. The most popular party was the PLRT which received 159 or 24.9% of the vote. The next three most popular parties were; the LEGA (with 147 or 23.0%), the PS (with 120 or 18.8%) and the PPD (with 97 or 15.2%).

== Economy ==
As of 2007, Magadino had an unemployment rate of 4.02%. As of 2005, there were 32 people employed in the primary economic sector and about 10 businesses involved in this sector. 455 people were employed in the secondary sector and there were 43 businesses in this sector. 383 people were employed in the tertiary sector, with 68 businesses in this sector. There were 688 residents of the village who were employed in some capacity, of which females made up 40.1% of the workforce.

In 2000, there were 635 workers who commuted into the village and 456 workers who commuted away. The village is a net importer of workers, with about 1.4 workers entering the village for every one leaving. About 22.2% of the workforce coming into Magadino are coming from outside Switzerland. Of the working population, 6.7% used public transportation to get to work, and 70.5% used a private car.

As of 2009, there were 2 hotels in Magadino.

== Religion ==
From the 2000 census, 1,184 or 79.0% were Roman Catholic, while 134 or 8.9% belonged to the Swiss Reformed Church. There are 136 individuals (or about 9.07% of the population) who belong to another church (not listed on the census), and 45 individuals (or about 3.00% of the population) did not answer the question.

== Education ==
The entire Swiss population is generally well educated. In Magadino about 70.3% of the population (between age 25 and 64) have completed either non-mandatory upper secondary education or additional higher education (either University or a Fachhochschule).

In Magadino there were a total of 283 students (as of 2009). The Ticino education system provides up to three years of non-mandatory kindergarten and in Magadino there were 38 children in kindergarten. The primary school program lasts for five years and includes both a standard school and a special school. In the village, 82 students attended the standard primary schools and 9 students attended the special school. In the lower secondary school system, students either attend a two-year middle school followed by a two-year pre-apprenticeship or they attend a four-year program to prepare for higher education. There were 68 students in the two-year middle school, while 29 students were in the four-year advanced program.

The upper secondary school includes several options, but at the end of the upper secondary program, a student will be prepared to enter a trade or to continue on to a university or college. In Ticino, vocational students may either attend school while working on their internship or apprenticeship (which takes three or four years) or may attend school followed by an internship or apprenticeship (which takes one year as a full-time student or one and a half to two years as a part-time student). There were 17 vocational students who were attending school full-time and 39 who attend part-time.

The professional program lasts three years and prepares a student for a job in engineering, nursing, computer science, business, tourism and similar fields. There was 1 student in the professional program.

As of 2000, there were 2 students in Magadino who came from another village, while 71 residents attended schools outside the village.

== Climate ==
Magadino has an oceanic climate that closely borders on a humid subtropical climate under the Köppen climate classification. With winter overnight lows averaging near −3 °C (27 °F), the local climate also has sizeable continental influences. Even with the continental aspect, extremes seldom differ vastly from the means. As a result, the normal annual temperature range only goes from 33 °C (91 °F) to about −9 °C (16 °F). Magadino has an average of 1,806 mm (71.1 in) of precipitation in just 101 days, due to heavy convection for much of the year.

Climate data for Magadino/Cadenazzo, elevation 203 m (666 ft), (1991–2020 normals, extremes since 1955)
| Month | Jan | Feb | Mar | Apr | May | Jun | Jul | Aug | Sep | Oct | Nov | Dec | Year |
|---|---|---|---|---|---|---|---|---|---|---|---|---|---|
| Record high °C (°F) | 23.7 (74.7) | 23.9 (75.0) | 28.0 (82.4) | 30.7 (87.3) | 31.6 (88.9) | 36.1 (97.0) | 37.2 (99.0) | 36.1 (97.0) | 31.9 (89.4) | 29.6 (85.3) | 22.8 (73.0) | 21.1 (70.0) | 37.2 (99.0) |
| Mean maximum °C (°F) | 13.8 (56.8) | 16.2 (61.2) | 22.2 (72.0) | 24.8 (76.6) | 28.3 (82.9) | 31.3 (88.3) | 32.0 (89.6) | 31.5 (88.7) | 27.6 (81.7) | 23.1 (73.6) | 18.0 (64.4) | 14.3 (57.7) | 32.7 (90.9) |
| Mean daily maximum °C (°F) | 6.7 (44.1) | 9.3 (48.7) | 14.3 (57.7) | 17.9 (64.2) | 21.8 (71.2) | 25.8 (78.4) | 28.0 (82.4) | 27.3 (81.1) | 22.6 (72.7) | 17.0 (62.6) | 11.2 (52.2) | 6.9 (44.4) | 17.4 (63.3) |
| Daily mean °C (°F) | 1.5 (34.7) | 3.6 (38.5) | 8.4 (47.1) | 12.3 (54.1) | 16.3 (61.3) | 20.1 (68.2) | 21.9 (71.4) | 21.1 (70.0) | 16.9 (62.4) | 11.9 (53.4) | 6.4 (43.5) | 1.8 (35.2) | 11.9 (53.4) |
| Mean daily minimum °C (°F) | −2.8 (27.0) | −1.7 (28.9) | 2.0 (35.6) | 5.8 (42.4) | 10.3 (50.5) | 14.1 (57.4) | 15.6 (60.1) | 15.4 (59.7) | 11.6 (52.9) | 7.1 (44.8) | 2.0 (35.6) | −2.4 (27.7) | 6.4 (43.5) |
| Mean minimum °C (°F) | −6.8 (19.8) | −5.9 (21.4) | −3.0 (26.6) | 0.2 (32.4) | 5.3 (41.5) | 9.3 (48.7) | 10.9 (51.6) | 10.4 (50.7) | 6.0 (42.8) | 0.9 (33.6) | −3.7 (25.3) | −7.2 (19.0) | −8.8 (16.2) |
| Record low °C (°F) | −13.9 (7.0) | −16.9 (1.6) | −7.7 (18.1) | −4.0 (24.8) | −2.2 (28.0) | 3.9 (39.0) | 5.0 (41.0) | 6.1 (43.0) | 2.2 (36.0) | −3.4 (25.9) | −10.0 (14.0) | −13.2 (8.2) | −16.9 (1.6) |
| Average precipitation mm (inches) | 71.6 (2.82) | 62.1 (2.44) | 86.9 (3.42) | 158.0 (6.22) | 197.0 (7.76) | 178.4 (7.02) | 156.0 (6.14) | 194.0 (7.64) | 195.7 (7.70) | 202.2 (7.96) | 214.3 (8.44) | 90.0 (3.54) | 1,806.2 (71.11) |
| Average snowfall cm (inches) | 14.0 (5.5) | 3.9 (1.5) | 0.9 (0.4) | 0.0 (0.0) | 0.0 (0.0) | 0.0 (0.0) | 0.0 (0.0) | 0.0 (0.0) | 0.0 (0.0) | 0.0 (0.0) | 0.2 (0.1) | 11.1 (4.4) | 30.1 (11.9) |
| Average precipitation days (≥ 1.0 mm) | 5.3 | 4.5 | 6.3 | 9.6 | 11.9 | 10.6 | 9.1 | 10.3 | 8.5 | 9.4 | 9.5 | 6.2 | 101.2 |
| Average snowy days (≥ 1.0 cm) | 1.3 | 1.0 | 0.3 | 0.0 | 0.0 | 0.0 | 0.0 | 0.0 | 0.0 | 0.0 | 0.1 | 1.2 | 3.9 |
| Average relative humidity (%) | 77 | 70 | 63 | 65 | 69 | 70 | 69 | 73 | 76 | 81 | 80 | 79 | 73 |
| Mean monthly sunshine hours | 110.6 | 143.5 | 195.2 | 190.3 | 207.0 | 239.0 | 270.5 | 249.2 | 193.5 | 144.8 | 96.1 | 82.4 | 2,122.1 |
| Percentage possible sunshine | 62 | 63 | 60 | 51 | 49 | 56 | 63 | 63 | 58 | 52 | 50 | 58 | 57 |
Source 1: NOAA
Source 2: MeteoSwiss (snow 1981–2010); Infoclimat
