= Ronco sopra Ascona =

- Municipality
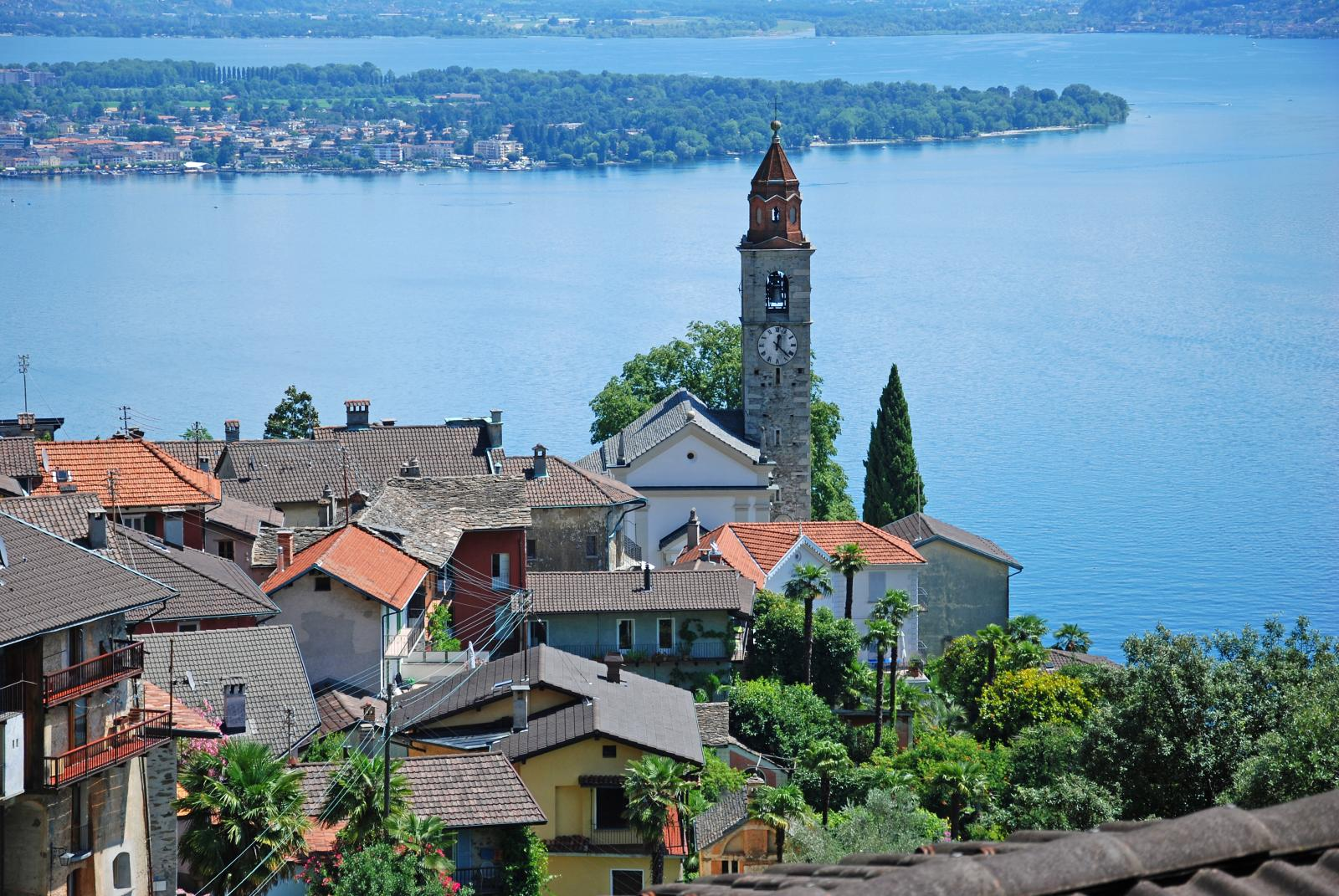
- Ronco sopra Ascona village

- Flag Coat of arms
- Location of Ronco sopra Ascona
- Location within Switzerland Location within Canton of Ticino
- Coordinates: 46°8′N 8°44′E
- Country: Switzerland
- Canton: Ticino
- District: Locarno

Government
  - Mayor: Sindaco; Paolo Senn

Area
  - Total: 5.02 km^{2} (1.94 sq mi)
- Elevation: 353 m (1,158 ft)

Population (December 2024)
  - Total: 522
  - Density: 104/km^{2} (269/sq mi)
- Time zone: UTC+01:00 (CET)
  - Summer (DST): UTC+02:00 (CEST)
- Postal code: 6622
- SFOS number: 5125
- ISO 3166 code: CH-TI
- Surrounded by: Ascona, Brissago, Caviano, Gerra (Gambarogno), Maccagno con Pino e Veddasca (IT-VA), San Nazzaro, Sant'Abbondio
- Website: www.ronco-s-ascona.ch

Ronco sopra Ascona is a municipality near Locarno in the canton of Ticino in Switzerland around 5 kilometers along the shore north of the border with Italy. It lies on the northern shore of Lake Maggiore, which stretches far to the south into Italy, being the second largest lake in Italy. It does not include the Brissago islands in the lake.

== History ==
Aerial view (1946)

Ronco sopra Ascona is first mentioned in 1264 as Roncha. In 1498 it was mentioned as Ronca de Scona. Ronco sopra Ascona and Ascona a Vicinanza by 1321. The vicinanza had its own statutes by 1369, and broke up in 1641. In the early modern period it was part of the Bailiwick of Locarno.

The Church of S. Martino is first mentioned in 1498. In 1626 it broke away from the parish of Ascona to form an independent parish. However, the local priest elected was chosen by the priest in Ascona from 1632 until 1813.

Viticulture and animal husbandry were the main sources of income in the village. Many inhabitants emigrated to Tuscany, where they had a monopoly on customs duties for goods coming from Florence and Livorno. Starting in the 19th century these emigrants also began going overseas. Since the mid-20th century Ronco sopra Ascona is a popular resort, with many vacation homes. In 2000, about three-fifths of the workforce commutes.

== Geography ==
Ronco sopra Ascona has an area, as of 1997, of 5.02 square kilometers (1.94 sq mi). Of this area, 0.44 km^{2} (0.17 sq mi) or 8.8% is used for agricultural purposes, while 3.87 km^{2} (1.49 sq mi) or 77.1% is forested. Of the rest of the land, 0.61 km^{2} (0.24 sq mi) or 12.2% is settled (buildings or roads), 0.01 km^{2} (2.5 acres) or 0.2% is either rivers or lakes and 0.37 km^{2} (0.14 sq mi) or 7.4% is unproductive land.

Of the built up area, housing and buildings made up 8.6% and transportation infrastructure made up 3.4%. Out of the forested land, 72.5% of the total land area is heavily forested and 3.6% is covered with orchards or small clusters of trees. Of the agricultural land, 0.0% is used for growing crops and 8.6% is used for alpine pastures. All the water in the municipality is flowing water. Of the unproductive areas, 7.2% is unproductive vegetation.

The municipality is located in the Locarno district. It consists of the village of Ronco sopra Ascona and the hamlets Fontana Martina and Porto Ronco.

== Coat of arms ==
The blazon of the municipal coat of arms is Vert St. Marin armoured argent riding a horse sable cutting his cloak gules with a sword of the second giving it to a beggar of the same kneeling in the base.

== Natives/residents ==
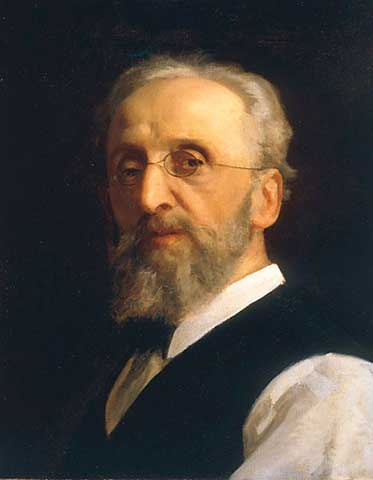
Self portrait of Antonio Ciseri

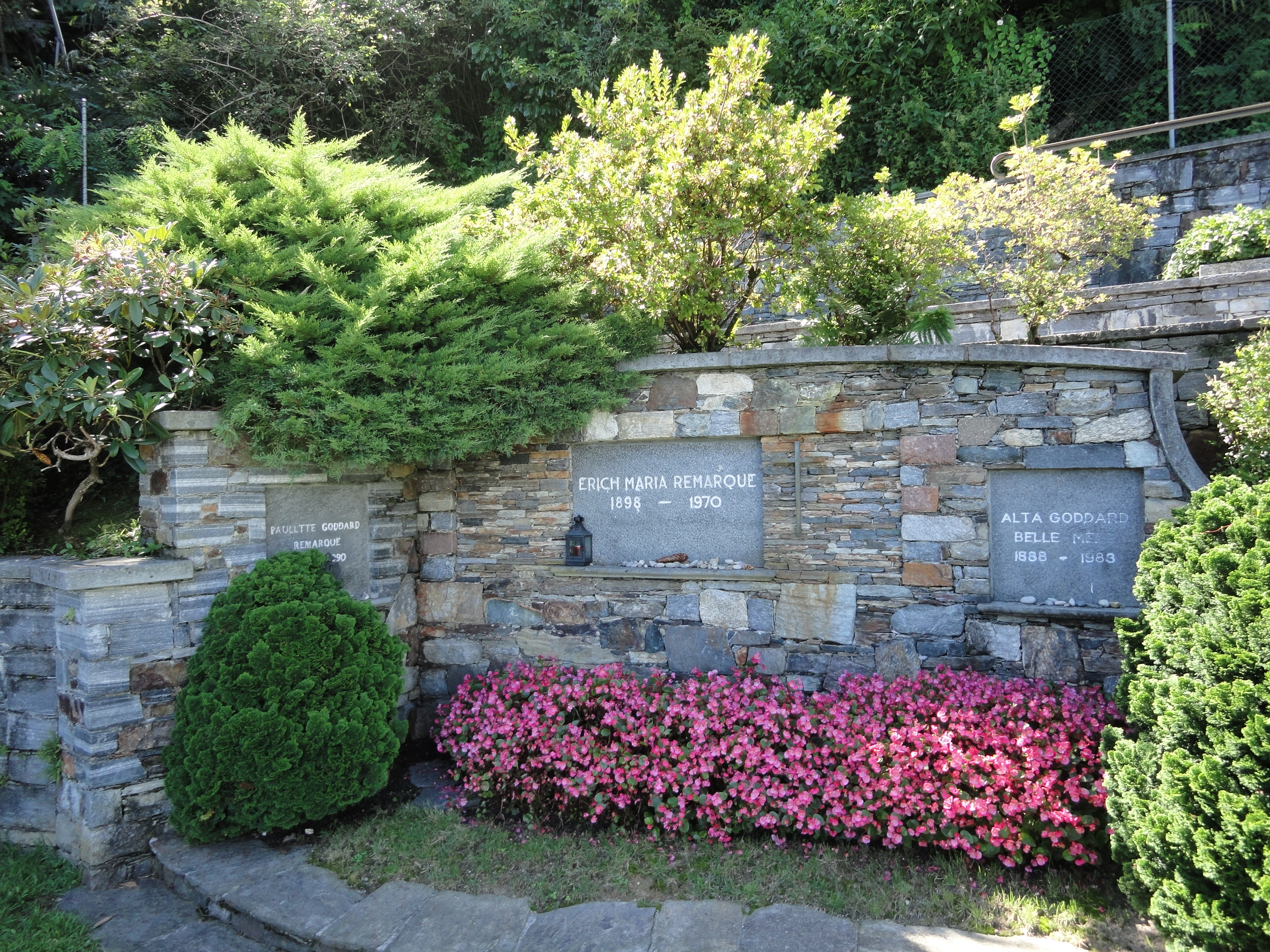
Remarque tomb

The painter Antonio Ciseri was born there in 1821.

German writer Erich Maria Remarque lived in Porto Ronco in the Casa Monte Tabor together with his wife, American actress Paulette Goddard, until he died in 1970. Paulette Goddard died there in 1990. The couple is buried alongside each other in Ronco's cemetery.

== Demographics ==
Ronco sopra Ascona has a population (as of December 2020) of 550. As of 2008, 24.8% of the population are resident foreign nationals. Over the last 10 years (1997–2007) the population has changed at a rate of -9.8%.

Most of the population (as of 2000) speaks Italian (61.5%), with German being second most common (33.7%) and Portuguese being third (1.7%). Of the Swiss national languages (as of 2000), 222 speak German, 8 people speak French, 405 people speak Italian. The remainder (24 people) speak another language.

As of 2008, the gender distribution of the population was 50.6% male and 49.4% female. The population was made up of 253 Swiss men (37.4% of the population), and 89 (13.2%) non-Swiss men. There were 256 Swiss women (37.9%), and 78 (11.5%) non-Swiss women.

In 2008 there were 7 live births to Swiss citizens and were 10 deaths of Swiss citizens. Ignoring immigration and emigration, the population of Swiss citizens decreased by 3 while the foreign population remained the same. There was 1 Swiss man and 2 Swiss women who emigrated from Switzerland. At the same time, there were 11 non-Swiss men and 5 non-Swiss women who immigrated from another country to Switzerland. The total Swiss population change in 2008 (from all sources, including moves across municipal borders) was a decrease of 10 and the non-Swiss population change was an increase of 8 people. This represents a population growth rate of -0.3%.

The age distribution, as of 2009, in Ronco sopra Ascona is; 36 children or 5.3% of the population are between 0 and 9 years old and 43 teenagers or 6.4% are between 10 and 19. Of the adult population, 56 people or 8.3% of the population are between 20 and 29 years old. 53 people or 7.8% are between 30 and 39, 109 people or 16.1% are between 40 and 49, and 119 people or 17.6% are between 50 and 59. The senior population distribution is 119 people or 17.6% of the population are between 60 and 69 years old, 92 people or 13.6% are between 70 and 79, there are 49 people or 7.2% who are over 80.

As of 2000, there were 343 private households in the municipality, and an average of 1.9 persons per household. In 2000 there were 482 single family homes (or 72.4% of the total) out of a total of 666 inhabited buildings. There were 104 two family buildings (15.6%) and 58 multi-family buildings (8.7%). There were also 22 buildings in the municipality that were multipurpose buildings (used for both housing and commercial or another purpose).

The vacancy rate for the municipality, in 2008, was 0%. In 2000 there were 992 apartments in the municipality. The most common apartment size was the 3 room apartment of which there were 298. There were 105 single room apartments and 154 apartments with five or more rooms. Of these apartments, a total of 341 apartments (34.4% of the total) were permanently occupied, while 643 apartments (64.8%) were seasonally occupied and 8 apartments (0.8%) were empty. As of 2007, the construction rate of new housing units was 0 new units per 1000 residents.

The historical population is given in the following table:

year	population
1850	378
1900	257
1950	540
1980	745
1990	702
2000	659

== Politics ==
In the 2007 federal election the most popular party was the SVP which received 24.48% of the vote. The next three most popular parties were the SP (23.26%), the FDP (22.77%) and the Ticino League (11.48%). In the federal election, a total of 212 votes were cast, and the voter turnout was 43.5%.

In the 2007 Gran Consiglio election, there were a total of 482 registered voters in Ronco sopra Ascona, of which 241 or 50.0% voted. 1 blank ballot and 2 null ballots were cast, leaving 238 valid ballots in the election. The most popular party was the PLRT which received 54 or 22.7% of the vote. The next three most popular parties were; the PS (with 46 or 19.3%), the SSI (with 42 or 17.6%) and the UDC (with 34 or 14.3%).

In the 2007 Consiglio di Stato election, 1 blank ballot and 1 null ballot was cast, leaving 240 valid ballots in the election. The most popular party was the PS which received 55 or 22.9% of the vote. The next three most popular parties were; the PLRT (with 54 or 22.5%), the LEGA (with 53 or 22.1%) and the SSI (with 28 or 11.7%).

== Economy ==
As of 2007, Ronco sopra Ascona had an unemployment rate of 3.59%. As of 2005, there were 6 people employed in the primary economic sector and about 5 businesses involved in this sector. 15 people were employed in the secondary sector and there were 8 businesses in this sector. 119 people were employed in the tertiary sector, with 27 businesses in this sector. There were 285 residents of the municipality who were employed in some capacity, of which females made up 40.0% of the workforce.

In 2000, there were 87 workers who commuted into the municipality and 178 workers who commuted away. The municipality is a net exporter of workers, with about 2.0 workers leaving the municipality for every one entering. About 25.3% of the workforce coming into Ronco sopra Ascona are coming from outside Switzerland. Of the working population, 6.7% used public transportation to get to work, and 53.7% used a private car.

As of 2009, there were 5 hotels in Ronco sopra Ascona with a total of 69 rooms and 128 beds.

== Religion ==
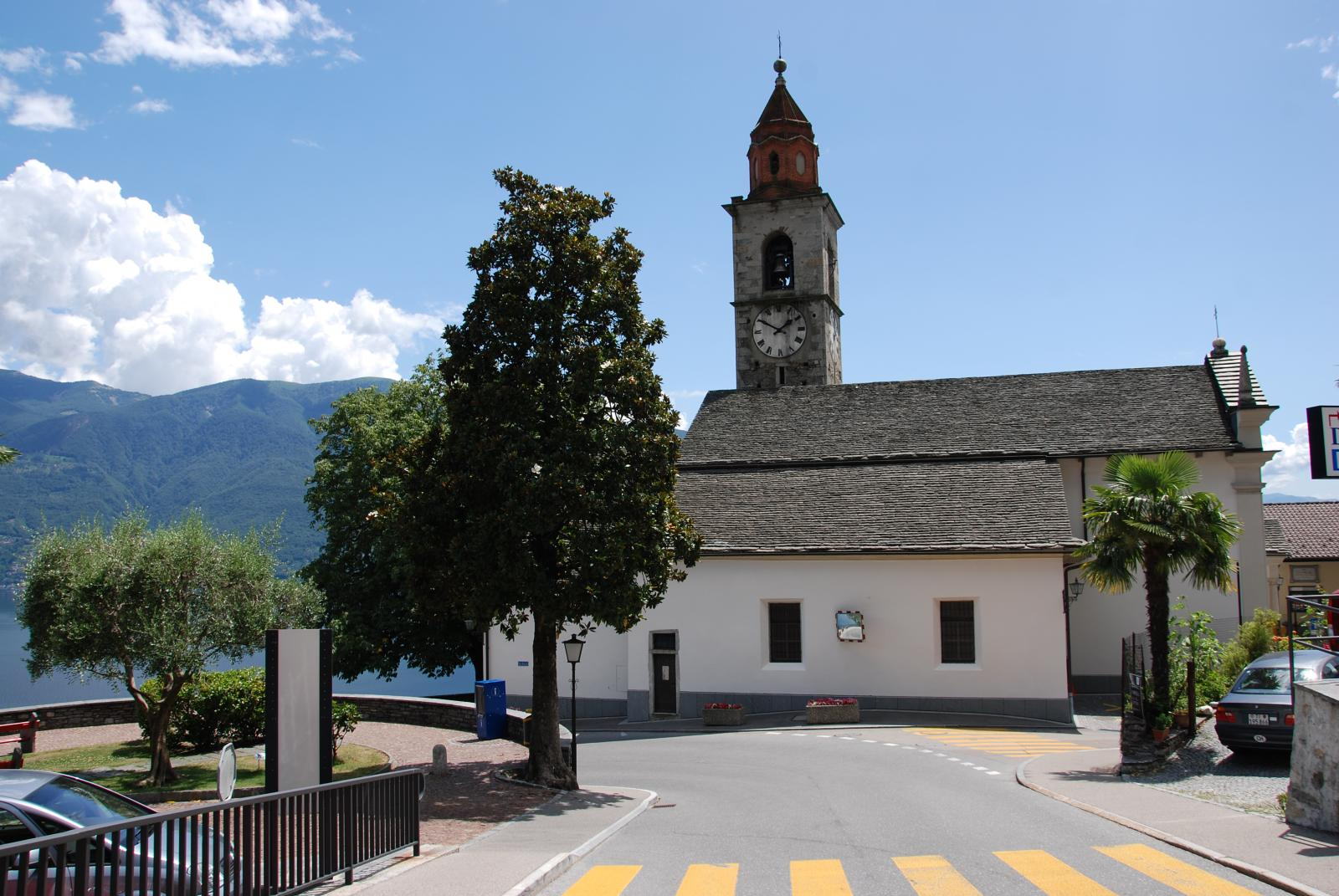
Church of Ronco sopra Ascona

From the 2000 census, 407 or 61.8% were Roman Catholic, while 151 or 22.9% belonged to the Swiss Reformed Church. There were 76 persons (or about 11.53% of the population) who belong to another church (not listed on the census), and 25 persons (or about 3.79% of the population) did not answer the question.

== Education ==
In Ronco sopra Ascona about 68.9% of the population (between age 25 and 64) have completed either non-mandatory upper secondary education or additional higher education (either university or a Fachhochschule).

In Ronco sopra Ascona there were a total of 57 students (as of 2009). The Ticino education system provides up to three years of non-mandatory kindergarten and in Ronco sopra Ascona there were 10 children in kindergarten. The primary school program lasts for five years. In the village, 11 students attended the standard primary schools. In the lower secondary school system, students either attend a two-year middle school followed by a two-year pre-apprenticeship or they attend a four-year program to prepare for higher education. There were 13 students in the two-year middle school, while 11 students were in the four-year advanced program.

The upper secondary school includes several options, but at the end of the upper secondary program, a student will be prepared to enter a trade or to continue on to a university or college. In Ticino, vocational students may either attend school while working on their internship or apprenticeship (which takes three or four years) or may attend school followed by an internship or apprenticeship (which takes one year as a full-time student or one and a half to two years as a part-time student). There were 2 vocational students who were attending school full-time and 7 who attend part-time.

The professional program lasts three years and prepares a student for a job in engineering, nursing, computer science, business, tourism and similar fields. There were 3 students in the professional program.

As of 2000, there were 3 students in Ronco sopra Ascona who came from another municipality, while 66 residents attended schools outside the municipality.
