= Indemini =

- Former municipality
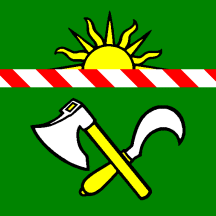
- Flag Coat of arms
- Location of Indemini
- Location within Switzerland Location within Canton of Ticino
- Coordinates: 46°05′40″N 8°49′34″E
- Country: Switzerland
- Canton: Ticino
- District: Locarno
- Municipality: Gambarogno

Area
  - Total: 11.3 km^{2} (4.4 sq mi)
- Elevation: 950 m (3,120 ft)

Population (December 2009)
  - Total: 43
  - Density: 3.8/km^{2} (9.9/sq mi)
- Time zone: UTC+01:00 (CET)
  - Summer (DST): UTC+02:00 (CEST)
- Postal code: 6571
- SFOS number: 5110
- ISO 3166 code: CH-TI
- Surrounded by: Alto Malcantone, Curiglia con Monteviasco (IT-VA), Gerra (Gambarogno), Piazzogna, San Nazzaro, Sant'Abbondio, Sigirino, Veddasca (IT-VA), Vira (Gambarogno)
- Website: indemini.ch

Indemini (Italian pronunciation: [inˈdeːmini]) is a former municipality in the district of Locarno in the canton of Ticino in Switzerland.

On 25 April 2010, the former municipalities of Caviano, Contone, Gerra Gambarogno, Indemini, Magadino, Piazzogna, San Nazzaro, Sant'Abbondio and Vira Gambarogno merged into the new municipality of Gambarogno.

== History ==
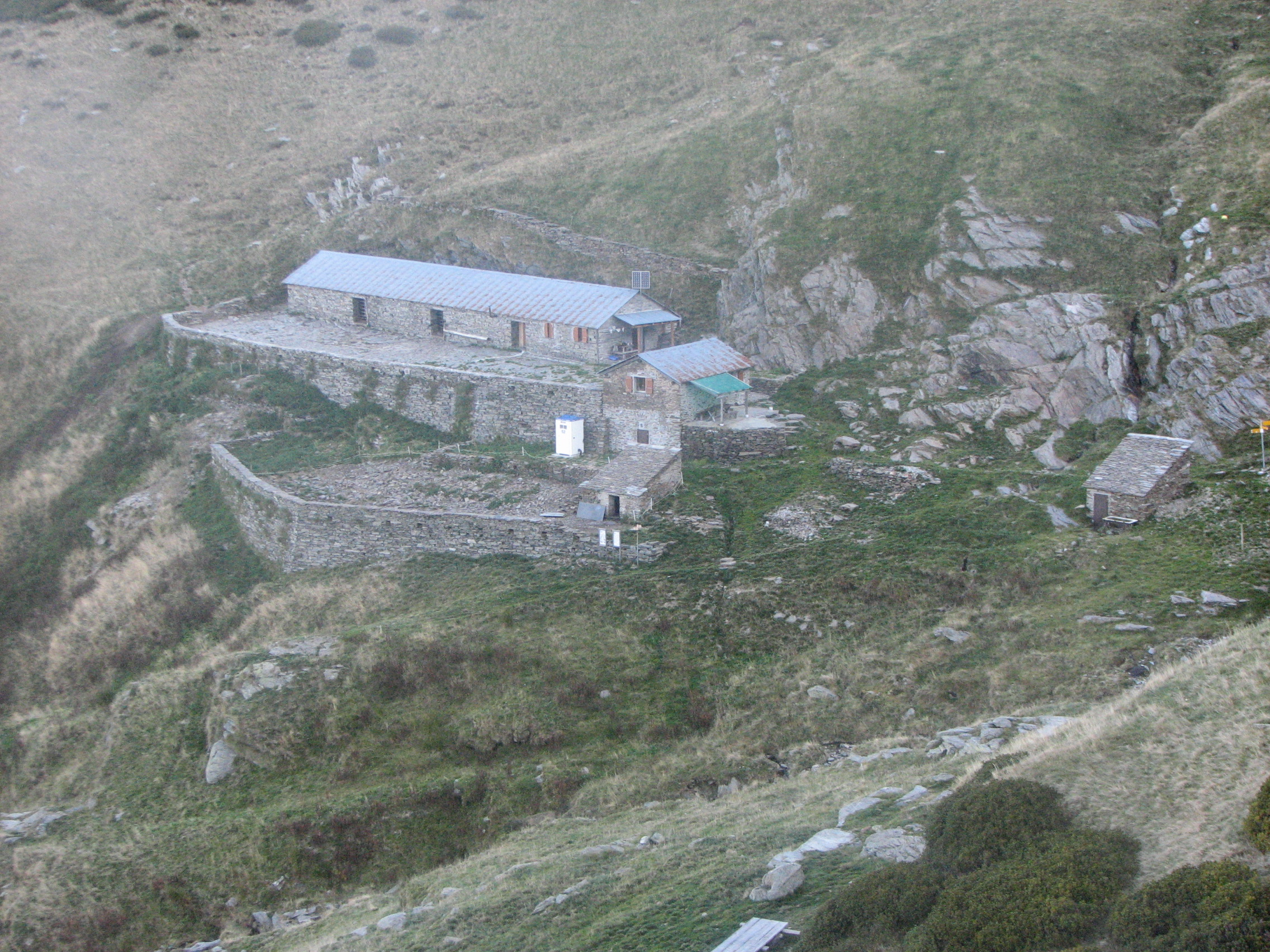
Montoia alpine pasture, one of summer pastures near Indemini

Indemini is first mentioned in 1260 as Indemine. In the Middle Ages it was part of the Vicinanza of Gambarogno. In the 17th century there were disputes over alpine pastures and forest owned by the village cooperatives of the Valle Veddasca and the Malcantone. In 1752, these border disputes were resolved with the Treaty of Varese. In 1800, the Helvetic government considered exchanging Indemini for Campione d'Italia in the Cisalpine Republic.

A vice-parish was formed in 1556 after they broke away from the parish of Vira. The church of San Bartolomeo, which is probably built before 1213, was expanded in the 17th century and renovated in the 19th century.

The village was isolated for most of its history. It wasn't until 1917–18 that a roadway was built on the Swiss side. A road from Italy wasn't built until 1964. The isolation helped Indemini to retain its rural appearance. In the past, the village economy relied on agriculture, but it declined in importance in the 1970s and 80s. During most of the year, the village is mostly abandoned, but in the summer season the population expands rapidly.

== Geography ==
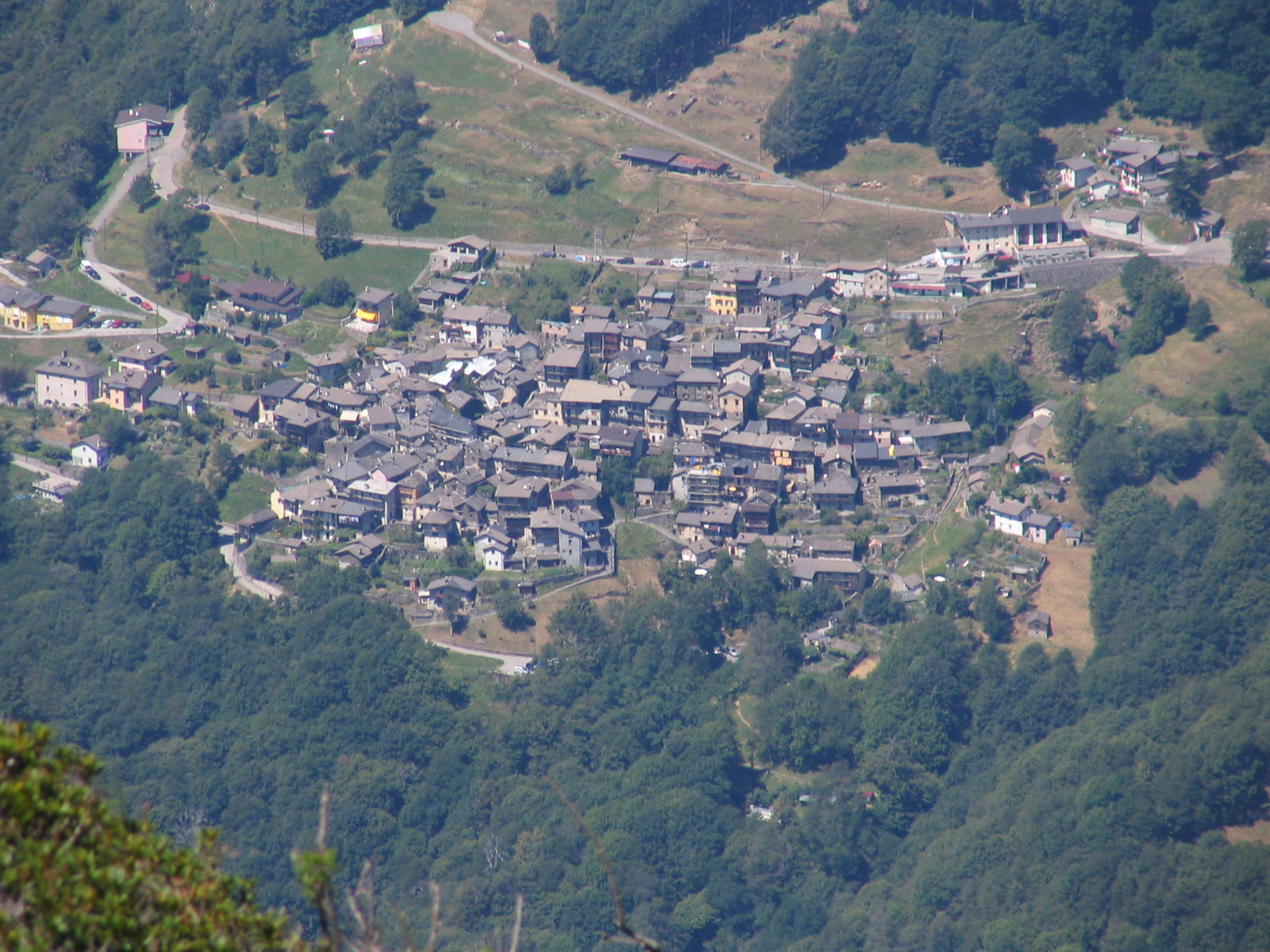
Indemini village

Aerial view (1954)

Indemini has an area, as of 1997, of 11.32 square kilometers (4.37 sq mi). Of this area, 0.11 km^{2} (0.042 sq mi) or 1.0% is used for agricultural purposes, while 8.86 km^{2} (3.42 sq mi) or 78.3% is forested. Of the rest of the land, 0.13 km^{2} (32 acres) or 1.1% is settled (buildings or roads), 0.07 km^{2} (17 acres) or 0.6% is either rivers or lakes and 1.5 km^{2} (0.58 sq mi) or 13.3% is unproductive land.

Of the built up area, housing and buildings made up 0.5% and transportation infrastructure made up 0.4%. Out of the forested land, 55.8% of the total land area is heavily forested, while 20.2% is covered in small trees and shrubbery and 2.2% is covered with orchards or small clusters of trees. Of the agricultural land, 0.4% is used for growing crops. All the water in the municipality is flowing water. Of the unproductive areas, 11.8% is unproductive vegetation and 1.4% is too rocky for vegetation.

The village is located in the Locarno district at an elevation of 938 m (3,077 ft) in the upper Valle Veddasca on the Italian border.

== Coat of arms ==
The blazon of the municipal coat of arms is Vert, a sickle and axe argent handled or in saltire and in chief a sun issuant from a barulette bendy argent and red.

== Demographics ==
Indemini has a population (as of December 2009) of 43. As of 2008, 4.7% of the population are resident foreign nationals. Over the last 10 years (1997–2007) the population has changed at a rate of −26.7%.

An even amount of the population (as of 2000) speaks German and Italian (48.7% each), with the rest speaking French (2.6%). Of the Swiss national languages (as of 2000), 19 speak German, 1 person speaks French, 19 people speak Italian.

As of 2008, the gender distribution of the population was 58.1% male and 41.9% female. The population was made up of 24 Swiss men (55.8% of the population), and 1 (2.3%) non-Swiss man. There were 16 Swiss women (37.2%), and 2 (4.7%) non-Swiss women. In 2008 there was the death of a Swiss citizen. Ignoring immigration and emigration, the population of Swiss citizens decreased by 1 while the foreign population remained the same. There was 1 Swiss man who immigrated back to Switzerland. The total Swiss population change in 2008 (from all sources, including moves across municipal borders) was a decrease of 2 and the non-Swiss population change was an increase of 1 person. This represents a population growth rate of −2.3%.

The age distribution, as of 2009, in Indemini is; there are no children between 0 and 9 years old and there are 2 teenagers or 4.7% who are between 10 and 19. Of the adult population, 6 people or 14.0% of the population are between 20 and 29 years old. 9 people or 20.9% are between 40 and 49, and 9 people or 20.9% are between 50 and 59. The senior population distribution is 12 people or 27.9% of the population are between 60 and 69 years old, 1 person is between 70 and 79, there are 4 people or 9.3% who are over 80.

As of 2000 the average number of residents per living room was 0.55 which is about equal to the cantonal average of 0.6 per room. In this case, a room is defined as space of a housing unit of at least 4 m^{2} (43 sq ft) as normal bedrooms, dining rooms, living rooms, kitchens and habitable cellars and attics. About 66.7% of the total households were owner occupied, or in other words did not pay rent (though they may have a mortgage or a rent-to-own agreement).

As of 2000, there were 21 private households in the village, and an average of 1.9 persons per household. In 2000 there were 213 single family homes (or 97.3% of the total) out of a total of 219 inhabited buildings. There were 3 two family buildings (1.4%) and 1 multi-family buildings (0.5%). There were also 2 buildings in the village that were multipurpose buildings (used for both housing and commercial or another purpose).

The vacancy rate for the village, in 2008, was 0%. In 2000 there were 225 apartments in the village. The most common apartment size was the 3-room apartment of which there were 66. There were 35 single room apartments and 28 apartments with five or more rooms. Of these apartments, a total of 21 apartments (9.3% of the total) were permanently occupied, while 204 apartments (90.7%) were seasonally occupied. As of 2007, the construction rate of new housing units was 0 new units per 1000 residents.

The historical population is given in the following table:

| year | population |
|---|---|
| 1591 | c. 200 |
| 1683 | 376 |
| 1801 | 287 |
| 1850 | 409 |
| 1900 | 340 |
| 1950 | 206 |
| 1970 | 64 |
| 2000 | 39 |

== Politics ==
In the 2007 federal election the most popular party was the FDP which received 30.43% of the vote. The next three most popular parties were the SP (16.85%), the CVP (14.13%) and the SVP (11.96%). In the federal election, a total of 23 votes were cast, and the voter turnout was 40.4%.

In the 2007 Gran Consiglio election, there were a total of 51 registered voters in Indemini, of which 24 or 47.1% voted. The most popular party was the PLRT which received 6 or 25.0% of the vote. The next three most popular parties were; the PS (with 5 or 20.8%), the PPD+GenGiova (with 4 or 16.7%) and the LEGA (with 2 or 8.3%).

In the 2007 Consiglio di Stato election, The most popular party was the PLRT which received 8 or 33.3% of the vote. The next three most popular parties were; the PLRT (with 8 or 33.3%), the PPD (with 4 or 16.7%) and the LEGA (with 2 or 8.3%).

== Economy ==
As of 2007, Indemini had an unemployment rate of 0%. As of 2005, there were 6 people employed in the primary economic sector and about 3 businesses involved in this sector. No one was employed in the secondary sector and there were no businesses in this sector. 6 people were employed in the tertiary sector, with 3 businesses in this sector. There were 12 residents of the village who were employed in some capacity, of which females made up 16.7% of the workforce.

In 2000, there were 5 workers who commuted into the village and 2 workers who commuted away. The village is a net importer of workers, with about 2.5 workers entering the village for every one leaving. Of the working population, 8.3% used public transportation to get to work, and 16.7% used a private car.

== Religion ==
From the 2000 census, 17 or 43.6% were Roman Catholic, while 10 or 25.6% belonged to the Swiss Reformed Church. There are 12 individuals (or about 30.77% of the population) who belong to another church (not listed on the census).

== Education ==
The entire Swiss population is generally well educated. In Indemini about 61.2% of the population (between age 25–64) have completed either non-mandatory upper secondary education or additional higher education (either University or a Fachhochschule).

In Indemini there were a total of 6 students (as of 2009). The Ticino education system provides up to three years of non-mandatory kindergarten and in Indemini there were children in kindergarten. The primary school program lasts for five years. In the village, 1 student attended the standard primary school. In the lower secondary school system, students either attend a two-year middle school followed by a two-year pre-apprenticeship or they attend a four-year program to prepare for higher education. There was 1 student in the two-year middle school, while 1 student was in the four-year advanced program.

The upper secondary school includes several options, but at the end of the upper secondary program, a student will be prepared to enter a trade or to continue on to a university or college. In Ticino, vocational students may either attend school while working on their internship or apprenticeship (which takes three or four years) or may attend school followed by an internship or apprenticeship (which takes one year as a full-time student or one and a half to two years as a part-time student). There were 2 vocational students who were attending school full-time and 0 who attend part-time.

The professional program lasts three years and prepares a student for a job in engineering, nursing, computer science, business, tourism and similar fields. There was 1 student in the professional program.

As of 2000, there were 9 students from Indemini who attended schools outside the village.
