= Caviano =

- Former municipality
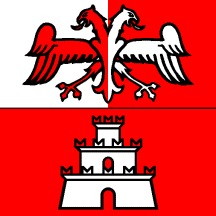
- Flag Coat of arms
- Location of Caviano
- Location within Switzerland Location within Canton of Ticino
- Coordinates: 46°06′N 8°46′E
- Country: Switzerland
- Canton: Ticino
- District: Locarno
- Municipality: Gambarogno

Area
  - Total: 3.2 km^{2} (1.2 sq mi)
- Elevation: 282 m (925 ft)

Population (December 2004)
  - Total: 124
  - Density: 39/km^{2} (100/sq mi)
- Time zone: UTC+01:00 (CET)
  - Summer (DST): UTC+02:00 (CEST)
- Postal code: 6578
- SFOS number: 5098
- ISO 3166 code: CH-TI
- Localities: Dirinella, Scalano
- Surrounded by: Brissago, Gerra, Pino sulla Sponda del Lago Maggiore, Ronco sopra Ascona, San Nazzaro, Sant'Abbondio, Veddasca
- Website: SFSO statistics

Caviano is a former municipality in the district of Locarno in the canton of Ticino in Switzerland.

On 25 April 2010, the former municipalities of Caviano, Contone, Gerra Gambarogno, Indemini, Magadino, Piazzogna, San Nazzaro, Sant'Abbondio and Vira Gambarogno merged in the new municipality of Gambarogno.

== History ==
Caviano is first mentioned in 1258 as Caviliano.

In 1264 and again in 1365, the Bishop of Como transferred part of the tithes of the Gambarogno valley, including Caviano and Scaiano, to the Magoria and Duno families from Locarno. Caviano originally belonged to the parish of Locarno, then in 1558 to Sant'Abbondio. It became a separate parish in 1850. The old church, the foundation is pre-Roman, was demolished in 1864 after the completion of the new church of S. Maria Nascente. Due to limited fishing and farming land, much of the population emigrated to other cantons or countries. The old outskirts of the village is still easily visible. In the settlement of Cento Campi, there were a number of alpine shelters and barns with thatched roofs, though most have fallen into disrepair. This type of shelter/barn was commonly used on the pastures (monti) around Lake Maggiore.

== Geography ==
Caviano has an area, as of 1997, of 3.2 square kilometers (1.2 sq mi). Of this area, 0.19 km^{2} (0.073 sq mi) or 5.9% is used for agricultural purposes, while 2.62 km^{2} (1.01 sq mi) or 81.9% is forested. Of the rest of the land, 0.23 km^{2} (0.089 sq mi) or 7.2% is settled (buildings or roads), 0.03 km^{2} (7.4 acres) or 0.9% is either rivers or lakes and 0.05 km^{2} (12 acres) or 1.6% is unproductive land.

Of the built up area, housing and buildings made up 5.0% and transportation infrastructure made up 1.9%. Out of the forested land, 79.7% of the total land area is heavily forested and 2.2% is covered with orchards or small clusters of trees. Of the agricultural land, 0.3% is used for growing crops and 5.0% is used for alpine pastures. Of the water in the village, 0.6% is in lakes and 0.3% is in rivers and streams. Of the unproductive areas, 1.3% is unproductive vegetation.

The village is located in the Locarno district, above Lake Maggiore. It was the westernmost municipality in the Gambarogno and shared a border with Italy at Dirinella. It consists of the village of Caviano and the hamlets of Scaiano.

== Coat of arms ==
The blazon of the municipal coat of arms is Per fess chief per pale argent and gules over the two a two-headed eagle displayed counterchanged and in base gules a tower with two turrets argent. The coat of arms comes from the Magoria family of Locarno and the Duni family of Ascona, both of which had feudal rights in Caviano."

== Demographics ==
Caviano has a population (As of 2004) of 124. As of 2008, 8.9% of the population are resident foreign nationals. Over the last 10 years (1997-2007) the population has changed at a rate of -21.8%.

Most of the population (as of 2000) speaks Italian (67.6%), with German being second most common (27.0%) and French being third (1.8%). Of the Swiss national languages (as of 2000), 30 speak German, 2 people speak French, 75 people speak Italian, and 1 person speaks Romansh. The remainder (3 people) speak another language.

As of 2008, the gender distribution of the population was 50.8% male and 49.2% female. The population was made up of 52 Swiss men (44.1% of the population), and 8 (6.8%) non-Swiss men. There were 53 Swiss women (44.9%), and 5 (4.2%) non-Swiss women.

In 2008 there were 2 live births to Swiss citizens and 1 death of a Swiss citizen. Ignoring immigration and emigration, the population of Swiss citizens increased by 1 while the foreign population remained the same. There was 1 Swiss woman who immigrated back to Switzerland and 1 non-Swiss man who immigrated from another country to Switzerland. The total Swiss population change in 2008 (from all sources, including moves across municipal borders) was an increase of 2 and the non-Swiss population change was a decrease of 1 people. This represents a population growth rate of 0.9%.

The age distribution, as of 2009, in Caviano is; 8 children or 6.8% of the population are between 0 and 9 years old and 7 teenagers or 5.9% are between 10 and 19. Of the adult population, 15 people or 12.7% of the population are between 20 and 29 years old. 6 people or 5.1% are between 30 and 39, 14 people or 11.9% are between 40 and 49, and 30 people or 25.4% are between 50 and 59. The senior population distribution is 21 people or 17.8% of the population are between 60 and 69 years old, 12 people or 10.2% are between 70 and 79, there are 5 people or 4.2% who are over 80.

As of 2000 the average number of residents per living room was 0.63 which is about equal to the cantonal average of 0.6 per room. In this case, a room is defined as space of a housing unit of at least 4 m^{2} (43 sq ft) as normal bedrooms, dining rooms, living rooms, kitchens and habitable cellars and attics. About 71.7% of the total households were owner occupied, or in other words did not pay rent (though they may have a mortgage or a rent-to-own agreement).

As of 2000, there were 46 private households in the village, and an average of 2.4 persons per household. In 2000 there were 259 single family homes (or 90.6% of the total) out of a total of 286 inhabited buildings. There were 15 two family buildings (5.2%) and 7 multi-family buildings (2.4%). There were also 5 buildings in the village that were multipurpose buildings (used for both housing and commercial or another purpose).

The vacancy rate for the village, in 2008, was 0%. In 2000 there were 328 apartments in the village. The most common apartment size was the 3 room apartment of which there were 110. There were 24 single room apartments and 50 apartments with five or more rooms. Of these apartments, a total of 46 apartments (14.0% of the total) were permanently occupied, while 282 apartments (86.0%) were seasonally occupied. As of 2007, the construction rate of new housing units was 0 new units per 1000 residents.

The historical population is given in the following table:

year	population
1591	59 Hearths
1808	249
1850	332
1900	272
1950	184
2000	111

== Politics ==
In the 2007 federal election the most popular party was the FDP which received 34.74% of the vote. The next three most popular parties were the SP (22.11%), the CVP (14.39%) and the Green Party (11.23%). In the federal election, a total of 37 votes were cast, and the voter turnout was 33.6%.

In the 2007 Gran Consiglio election, there were a total of 109 registered voters in Caviano, of which 53 or 48.6% voted. 1 blank ballot was cast, leaving 52 valid ballots in the election. The most popular party was the PLRT which received 15 or 28.8% of the vote. The next three most popular parties were; the PS (with 10 or 19.2%), the PPD+GenGiova (with 9 or 17.3%) and the SSI (with 8 or 15.4%).

In the 2007 Consiglio di Stato election, 2 blank ballots were cast, leaving 51 valid ballots in the election. The most popular party was the PLRT which received 12 or 23.5% of the vote. The next three most popular parties were; the PS (with 10 or 19.6%), the PPD (with 9 or 17.6%) and the PPD (with 9 or 17.6%).

== Economy ==
As of 2007, Caviano had an unemployment rate of 4.27%. As of 2005, there were 2 people employed in the primary economic sector and about 1 business involved in this sector. 8 people were employed in the secondary sector and there were 2 businesses in this sector. 29 people were employed in the tertiary sector, with 8 businesses in this sector. There were 40 residents of the village who were employed in some capacity, of which females made up 35.0% of the workforce.

In 2000, there were 17 workers who commuted into the village and 18 workers who commuted away. The village is a net exporter of workers, with about 1.1 workers leaving the village for every one entering. About 23.5% of the workforce coming into Caviano are coming from outside Switzerland. Of the working population, 2.5% used public transportation to get to work, and 52.5% used a private car.

As of 2009, there was one hotel in Caviano.

== Religion ==
From the 2000 census, 71 or 64.0% were Roman Catholic, while 19 or 17.1% belonged to the Swiss Reformed Church. There are 13 individuals (or about 11.71% of the population) who belong to another church (not listed on the census), and 8 individuals (or about 7.21% of the population) did not answer the question.

== Education ==
The entire Swiss population is generally well educated. In Caviano about 78.6% of the population (between age 25–64) have completed either non-mandatory upper secondary education or additional higher education (either University or a Fachhochschule).

In Caviano there were a total of 18 students (as of 2009). The Ticino education system provides up to three years of non-mandatory kindergarten and in Caviano there were 2 children in kindergarten. The primary school program lasts for five years. In the village, 4 students attended the standard primary schools. In the lower secondary school system, students either attend a two-year middle school followed by a two-year pre-apprenticeship or they attend a four-year program to prepare for higher education. There were 6 students in the two-year middle school, while 0 students were in the four-year advanced program.

The upper secondary school includes several options, but at the end of the upper secondary program, a student will be prepared to enter a trade or to continue on to a university or college. In Ticino, vocational students may either attend school while working on their internship or apprenticeship (which takes three or four years) or may attend school followed by an internship or apprenticeship (which takes one year as a full-time student or one and a half to two years as a part-time student). There were 3 vocational students who were attending school full-time and 2 who attend part-time.

The professional program lasts three years and prepares a student for a job in engineering, nursing, computer science, business, tourism and similar fields. There was 1 student in the professional program.

As of 2000, there were 12 students from Caviano who attended schools outside the village.
