= Vira (Gambarogno) =

- Former municipality
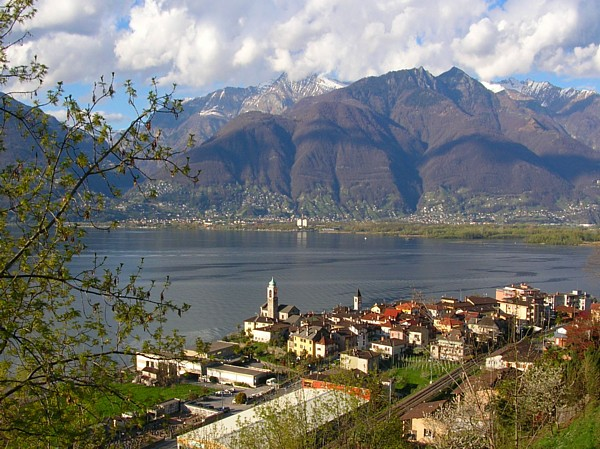

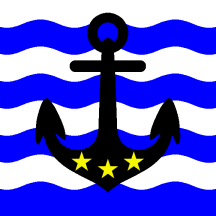
- Flag Coat of arms
- Location of Vira
- Location within Switzerland Location within Canton of Ticino
- Coordinates: 46°09′N 8°50′E
- Country: Switzerland
- Canton: Ticino
- District: Locarno
- Municipality: Gambarogno

Area
  - Total: 11.99 km^{2} (4.63 sq mi)
- Elevation: 201 m (659 ft)

Population (December 2009)
  - Total: 679
  - Density: 56.6/km^{2} (147/sq mi)
- Time zone: UTC+01:00 (CET)
  - Summer (DST): UTC+02:00 (CEST)
- Postal code: 6574
- SFOS number: 5134
- ISO 3166 code: CH-TI
- Surrounded by: Indemini, Magadino, Minusio, Piazzogna, Rivera, Sigirino
- Twin towns: Vaumarcus (Switzerland)
- Website: www.viragambarogno.ch

Vira is a former municipality in the district of Locarno in the canton of Ticino in Switzerland.

On 25 April 2010, the former municipalities of Caviano, Contone, Gerra Gambarogno, Indemini, Magadino, Piazzogna, San Nazzaro, Sant'Abbondio and Vira Gambarogno merged in the new municipality of Gambarogno.

== Geography ==
Aerial view (1965)

Vira (Gambarogno) has an area, as of 1997, of 11.99 square kilometers (4.63 sq mi). Of this area, 0.53 km^{2} (0.20 sq mi) or 4.4% is used for agricultural purposes, while 10.39 km^{2} (4.01 sq mi) or 86.7% is forested. Of the rest of the land, 0.56 km^{2} (0.22 sq mi) or 4.7% is settled (buildings or roads), 0.14 km^{2} (35 acres) or 1.2% is either rivers or lakes and 0.51 km^{2} (0.20 sq mi) or 4.3% is unproductive land.

Of the built up area, housing and buildings made up 3.0% and transportation infrastructure made up 1.7%. Out of the forested land, 73.1% of the total land area is heavily forested, while 11.8% is covered in small trees and shrubbery and 1.8% is covered with orchards or small clusters of trees. Of the agricultural land, 1.3% is used for growing crops and 3.0% is used for alpine pastures. All the water in the municipality is flowing water. Of the unproductive areas, 3.2% is unproductive vegetation and 1.1% is too rocky for vegetation.

== Coat of arms ==
The blazon of the municipal coat of arms is Bendy wavy of eight argent and azure and overall on a base of an anchor sable three mullets of five or.

== Demographics ==
Vira (Gambarogno) has a population (As of December 2009) of 679. As of 2008, 15.6% of the population are resident foreign nationals. Over the last 10 years (1997–2007) the population has changed at a rate of 2%.

Most of the population (as of 2000) speaks Italian (73.7%), with German being second most common (17.2%) and French being third (2.8%). Of the Swiss national languages (as of 2000), 106 speak German, 17 people speak French, 454 people speak Italian. The remainder (39 people) speak another language.

As of 2008, the gender distribution of the population was 48.0% male and 52.0% female. The population was made up of 262 Swiss men (38.6% of the population), and 64 (9.4%) non-Swiss men. There were 303 Swiss women (44.6%), and 50 (7.4%) non-Swiss women.

In 2008 there were 4 live births to Swiss citizens and were 7 deaths of Swiss citizens and 2 non-Swiss citizen deaths. Ignoring immigration and emigration, the population of Swiss citizens decreased by 3 while the foreign population decreased by 2. There were 2 Swiss men who immigrated back to Switzerland and 1 Swiss woman who emigrated from Switzerland. At the same time, there was 1 non-Swiss man and 5 non-Swiss women who immigrated from another country to Switzerland. The total Swiss population change in 2008 (from all sources, including moves across municipal borders) was a decrease of 3 and the non-Swiss population change was an increase of 6 people. This represents a population growth rate of 0.5%.

The age distribution, as of 2009, in Vira (Gambarogno) is; 53 children or 7.8% of the population are between 0 and 9 years old and 45 teenagers or 6.6% are between 10 and 19. Of the adult population, 57 people or 8.4% of the population are between 20 and 29 years old. 86 people or 12.7% are between 30 and 39, 95 people or 14.0% are between 40 and 49, and 104 people or 15.3% are between 50 and 59. The senior population distribution is 106 people or 15.6% of the population are between 60 and 69 years old, 77 people or 11.3% are between 70 and 79, there are 56 people or 8.2% who are over 80.

As of 2000 the average number of residents per living room was 0.56 which is about equal to the cantonal average of 0.6 per room. In this case, a room is defined as space of a housing unit of at least 4 m^{2} (43 sq ft) as normal bedrooms, dining rooms, living rooms, kitchens and habitable cellars and attics. About 44.6% of the total households were owner occupied, or in other words did not pay rent (though they may have a mortgage or a rent-to-own agreement).

As of 2000, there were 277 private households in the village, and an average of 2.2 persons per household. In 2000 there were 347 single family homes (or 74.6% of the total) out of a total of 465 inhabited buildings. There were 63 two family buildings (13.5%) and 31 multi-family buildings (6.7%). There were also 24 buildings in the village that were multipurpose buildings (used for both housing and commercial or another purpose).

The vacancy rate for the village, in 2008, was 0.13%. In 2000 there were 740 apartments in the village. The most common apartment size was the 4-room apartment of which there were 223. There were 88 single room apartments and 162 apartments with five or more rooms. Of these apartments, a total of 276 apartments (37.3% of the total) were permanently occupied, while 445 apartments (60.1%) were seasonally occupied and 19 apartments (2.6%) were empty. As of 2007, the construction rate of new housing units was 24.2 new units per 1000 residents.

The historical population is given in the following table:

year	population
1950	454
1960	530
1970	589
1980	579
1990	531
2000	616

== Politics ==
In the 2007 federal election the most popular party was the FDP which received 31.03% of the vote. The next three most popular parties were the CVP (30.16%), the SP (14.17%) and the Ticino League (11.03%). In the federal election, a total of 212 votes were cast, and the voter turnout was 41.6%.

In the 2007 Gran Consiglio election, there were a total of 500 registered voters in Vira (Gambarogno), of which 279 or 55.8% voted. 7 blank ballots were cast, leaving 272 valid ballots in the election. The most popular party was the PLRT which received 75 or 27.6% of the vote. The next three most popular parties were; the PPD+GenGiova (with 63 or 23.2%), the SSI (with 56 or 20.6%) and the LEGA (with 35 or 12.9%).

In the 2007 Consiglio di Stato election, 3 blank ballots and 2 null ballots were cast, leaving 274 valid ballots in the election. The most popular party was the PLRT which received 71 or 25.9% of the vote. The next three most popular parties were; the PPD (with 58 or 21.2%), the SSI (with 52 or 19.0%) and the LEGA (with 50 or 18.2%).

== Economy ==
As of 2007, Vira (Gambarogno) had an unemployment rate of 3.13%. As of 2005, there were 4 people employed in the primary economic sector and about 3 businesses involved in this sector. 39 people were employed in the secondary sector and there were 10 businesses in this sector. 223 people were employed in the tertiary sector, with 41 businesses in this sector. There were 277 residents of the village who were employed in some capacity, of which females made up 41.5% of the workforce.

In 2000, there were 92 workers who commuted into the village and 162 workers who commuted away. The village is a net exporter of workers, with about 1.8 workers leaving the village for every one entering. About 21.7% of the workforce coming into Vira (Gambarogno) are coming from outside Switzerland. Of the working population, 6.5% used public transportation to get to work, and 56.3% used a private car.

As of 2009, there were 6 hotels in Vira (Gambarogno) with a total of 79 rooms and 166 beds.

== Religion ==
From the 2000 census, 456 or 74.0% were Roman Catholic, while 78 or 12.7% belonged to the Swiss Reformed Church. There are 56 individuals (or about 9.09% of the population) who belong to another church (not listed on the census), and 26 individuals (or about 4.22% of the population) did not answer the question.

== Education ==
There are two schools in Vira: a municipal preschool site and a municipal primary school site.

The entire Swiss population is generally well educated. In Vira (Gambarogno) about 69.2% of the population (between age 25–64) have completed either non-mandatory upper secondary education or additional higher education (either University or a Fachhochschule).

In Vira (Gambarogno) there were a total of 84 students (as of 2009). The Ticino education system provides up to three years of non-mandatory kindergarten and in Vira (Gambarogno) there were 18 children in kindergarten. The primary school program lasts for five years. In the village, 26 students attended the standard primary schools. In the lower secondary school system, students either attend a two-year middle school followed by a two-year pre-apprenticeship or they attend a four-year program to prepare for higher education. There were 15 students in the two-year middle school and 1 in their pre-apprenticeship, while 6 students were in the four-year advanced program.

The upper secondary school includes several options, but at the end of the upper secondary program, a student will be prepared to enter a trade or to continue on to a university or college. In Ticino, vocational students may either attend school while working on their internship or apprenticeship (which takes three or four years) or may attend school followed by an internship or apprenticeship (which takes one year as a full-time student or one and a half to two years as a part-time student). There were 8 vocational students who were attending school full-time and 9 who attend part-time.

The professional program lasts three years and prepares a student for a job in engineering, nursing, computer science, business, tourism and similar fields. There was 1 student in the professional program.

As of 2000, there were 5 students in Vira (Gambarogno) who came from another village, while 41 residents attended schools outside the village.
