= Abundio Martínez =

Mexican musician and composer (1875–1914)

Abundio Martínez (February 8, 1875 – April 26, 1914) was a Mexican musician and composer. He was born on February 8, 1875, in Huichapan. His father was a carpenter and band director. He taught Abundio carpentry skills and various instruments such as trumpet, violin and drum. The whole family, seeking a better life, relocated to Mexico City. Abundio liked to listen to a band directed by Sappers Miguel Rios Toledano rehearsing on Corregidora Street. He joined a band, playing the clarinet, and became the composer of many popular pieces. However, he remained poor. Abundio became a victim of tuberculosis on April 26, 1914, in Mexico City. He was buried in the Pantheon of Dolores. Thirty years later, the inhabitants of Huichapan erected a monument in his honor.

== Compositions ==
- "Arpa de Oro" – waltz
- "En es Espacio" - waltz
- "Hidalguense" - paso doble
- "Liras Hermanas" - danza
- "≥s" – waltz
- "Morir de Amor" – danza
- "Noche apacible" – waltz
- "Para que sepas lo que es amar" – danza
- "Sonrisas de Angel" – waltz
- "Te amo, te adoro" – waltz
- "Consuelo" - Schottisch. Dedicado a la srita. Consuelo C. Cadena.
