= Abundio Peregrino García =

Mexican politician

- Born: 18 August 1953 (age 72); Tonalá, Chiapas, Mexico
- Occupation: Politician
- Political party: PT

Abundio Peregrino García (born 18 August 1953) is a Mexican politician from the Labor Party. From 2006 to 2009 he served as Deputy of the LX Legislature of the Mexican Congress representing Chiapas. He previously served in the Congress of Chiapas from 2003 to 2004.
