= Abundio =

Abundio is a given name. Notable people with the name include:

- Abundio Martínez (1875–1914), Mexican musician and composer
- Abundio "Larry" Montes (1911–1996), Filipino golfer
- Abundio Peregrino García (born 1953), Mexican politician
- Abundio Sagástegui Alva (1932–2012), Peruvian plant taxonomist
