= Gambarogno =

- Municipality
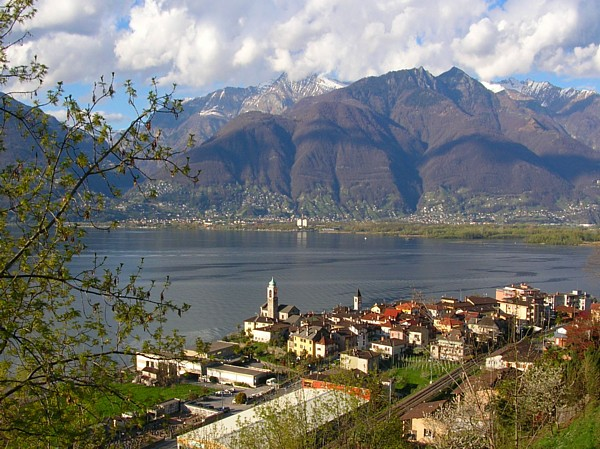
- Vira (Gambarogno) village

- Flag Coat of arms
- Location of Gambarogno
- Location within Switzerland Location within Canton of Ticino
- Coordinates: 46°6′N 08°46′E
- Country: Switzerland
- Canton: Ticino
- District: Locarno

Government
  - Mayor: Sindaco; Gianluigi Della-Santa

Area
  - Total: 51.74 km^{2} (19.98 sq mi)
- Elevation: 196 m (643 ft)

Population (December 2020)
  - Total: 5,163
  - Density: 99.79/km^{2} (258.4/sq mi)
- Time zone: UTC+01:00 (CET)
  - Summer (DST): UTC+02:00 (CEST)
- Postal code: 6573
- SFOS number: 5398
- ISO 3166 code: CH-TI
- Localities: Caviano, Contone, Gerra Gambarogno, Indemini, Magadino, Piazzogna, San Nazzaro, Sant'Abbondio and Vira Gambarogno
- Website: https://www.gambarogno.ch SFSO statistics

Gambarogno is a municipality in the district of Locarno in the canton of Ticino in Switzerland. It was created on 25 April 2010 through the merger of the municipalities of Caviano, Contone, Gerra, Indemini, Magadino, Piazzogna, San Nazzaro, Sant'Abbondio and Vira.

Gambarogno borders the following municipalities: Alto Malcantone, Ascona, Curiglia con Monteviasco (IT-VA), Locarno, Minusio, Monteceneri, Tenero-Contra, Maccagno con Pino e Veddasca (IT-VA).

== History ==
Caviano is first mentioned in 1258 as Caviliano. Contone is first mentioned in 1152 as Gondono. The name Gerra is probably from the 18th century, when the village of Ronco de Martignoni (which was first mentioned in 1591) expanded into the Gerra river delta and the shores of Lake Maggiore. Indemini is first mentioned in 1260 as Indemine. Magadino is first mentioned in 1254 as de Magadino. It was also previously known, in German, as Megadin though this name is no longer used. Piazzogna is first mentioned in 1337 as Piazognia. San Nazzaro is first mentioned in 1258 as Sancto Nazario. Sant'Abbondio is first mentioned in 1192 as Sancto Abundio.

=== Caviano ===
In 1264 and again in 1365, the Bishop of Como transferred part of the tithes of the Gambarogno valley, including Caviano and Scaiano, to the Magoria and Duno families from Locarno. Caviano originally belonged to the parish of Locarno, then in 1558 to Sant'Abbondio. It became a separate parish in 1850. The old church, the foundation is pre-Roman, was demolished in 1864 after the completion of the new church of S. Maria Nascente. Due to limited fishing and farming land, much of the population emigrated to other cantons or countries. The old outskirts of the village is still easily visible. In the settlement of Cento Campi, there were a number of alpine shelters and barns with thatched roofs, though most have fallen into disrepair. This type of shelter/barn was commonly used on the pastures (monti) around Lake Maggiore.

=== Contone ===
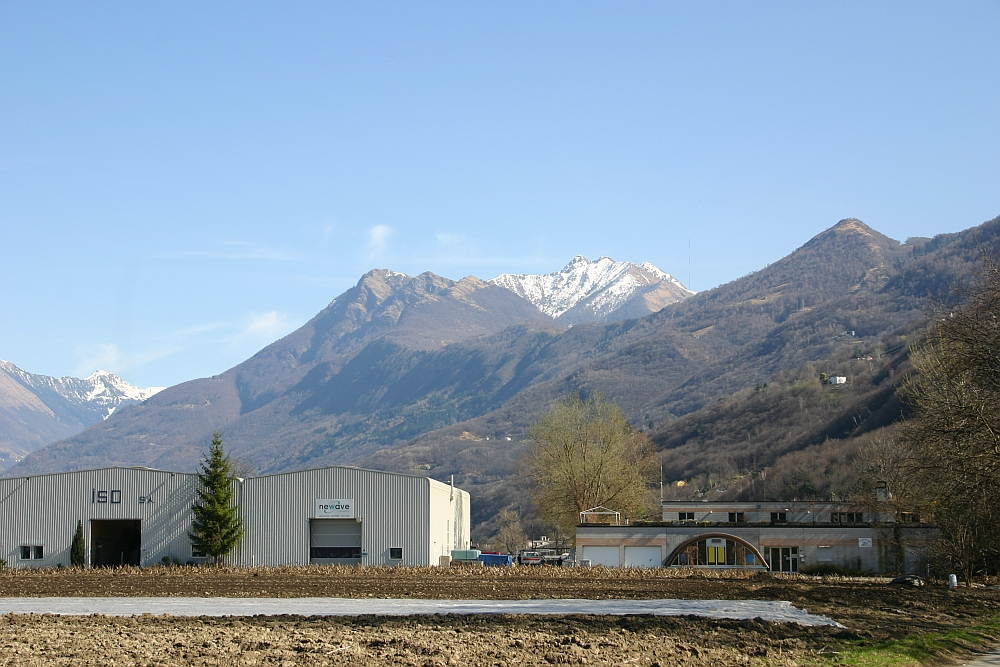
Luserte, a new development on the edge of Magadino at the border with Contone

Three tombs have been discovered in Contone, which can be dated earlier than the Early Middle Ages. These tombs date to the reopening of the alpine passes.

Some time before 1219, a Hospital of the Knights Hospitaller was built in the village. However, the exact foundation year and location are controversial. It was later Commandry of the Order of Malta. In the 16th century, the Commandry estates went to the hospital in Lugano and in 1811 to the Antognini family of Bellinzona.

In 1104, the Lombard nobleman Wido Samarate built or rebuilt a church and presented it to the Benedictine monastery of S. Giorgio in Quartino (Magadino). The church, which was dedicated to St. Nicholas, was incorporated in 1152 into the parish of Locarno. It was closed in 1769 and fell apart. The parish church of S. Giovanni Battista was built in the 16th-century church, on the site of the hospital church.

The inhabitants of Contone lived as herders and farmers, mostly on the lowest part of the slope of Mount Ceneri. After 1850, the employment situation changed because of the decline of the port of Magadino and railway construction. Many inhabitants emigrated abroad and found work as painters, plasterers and stove-makers. With immigration of, mainly Italian, day laborers, the population began to grow. At the end of the 20th century, most jobs were in the services sector. After the correction of the Ticino river, the vast, formerly marshy plain became home to a number of commercial and industrial buildings.

=== Gerra (Gambarogno) ===
Gerra was part of the old Vicinanza of Gambarogno. In the 16th century, Ronco de Martignoni, Ronco di Sopra and Scimiana joined to form an independent municipality. This municipality is listed in the register of lands of the parish of S. Abbondio from 1596. In 1744, the St. Rochus and Sebastian parish church was built.

Of the three inhabited settlement cores, Scimiana has remained nearly unchanged. The network of narrow streets and typical Gambarogno style alleys have been preserved, while most of the wooden balconies are gone and the fishermen's houses have disappeared. At the beginning of the 21st century more than half the working population is employed in the services sector, and most work outside of the municipality.

=== Indemini ===
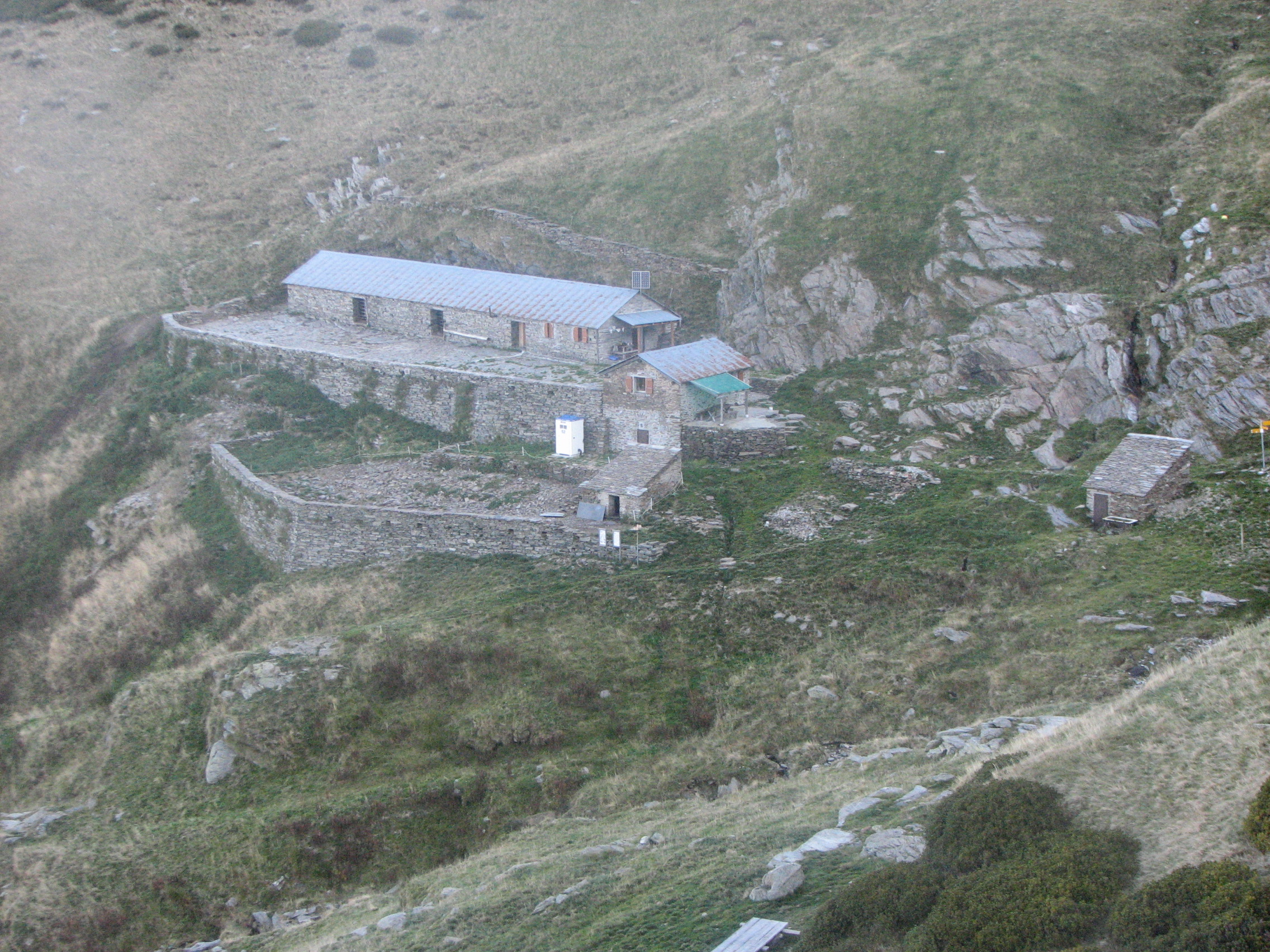
Montoia alpine pasture, one of summer pastures near Indemini

In the Middle Ages it was part of the Vicinanza of Gambarogno. In the 17th century there were disputes over alpine pastures and forest owned by the village cooperatives of the Valle Veddasca and the Malcantone. In 1752, these border disputes were resolved with the Treaty of Varese. In 1800, the Helvetic government considered exchanging Indemini for Campione d'Italia in the Cisalpine Republic.

A vice-parish was formed in 1556 after they broke away from the parish of Vira. The church of San Bartolomeo, which is probably built before 1213, was expanded in the 17th century and renovated in the 19th century.

The village was isolated for most of its history. It wasn't until 1917-18 that a roadway was built on the Swiss side. A road from Italy wasn't built until 1964. The isolation helped Indemini to retain its rural appearance. In the past, the village economy relied on agriculture, but it declined in importance in the 1970s and 80s. During most of the year, the village is mostly abandoned, but in the summer season the population expands rapidly.

=== Magadino ===
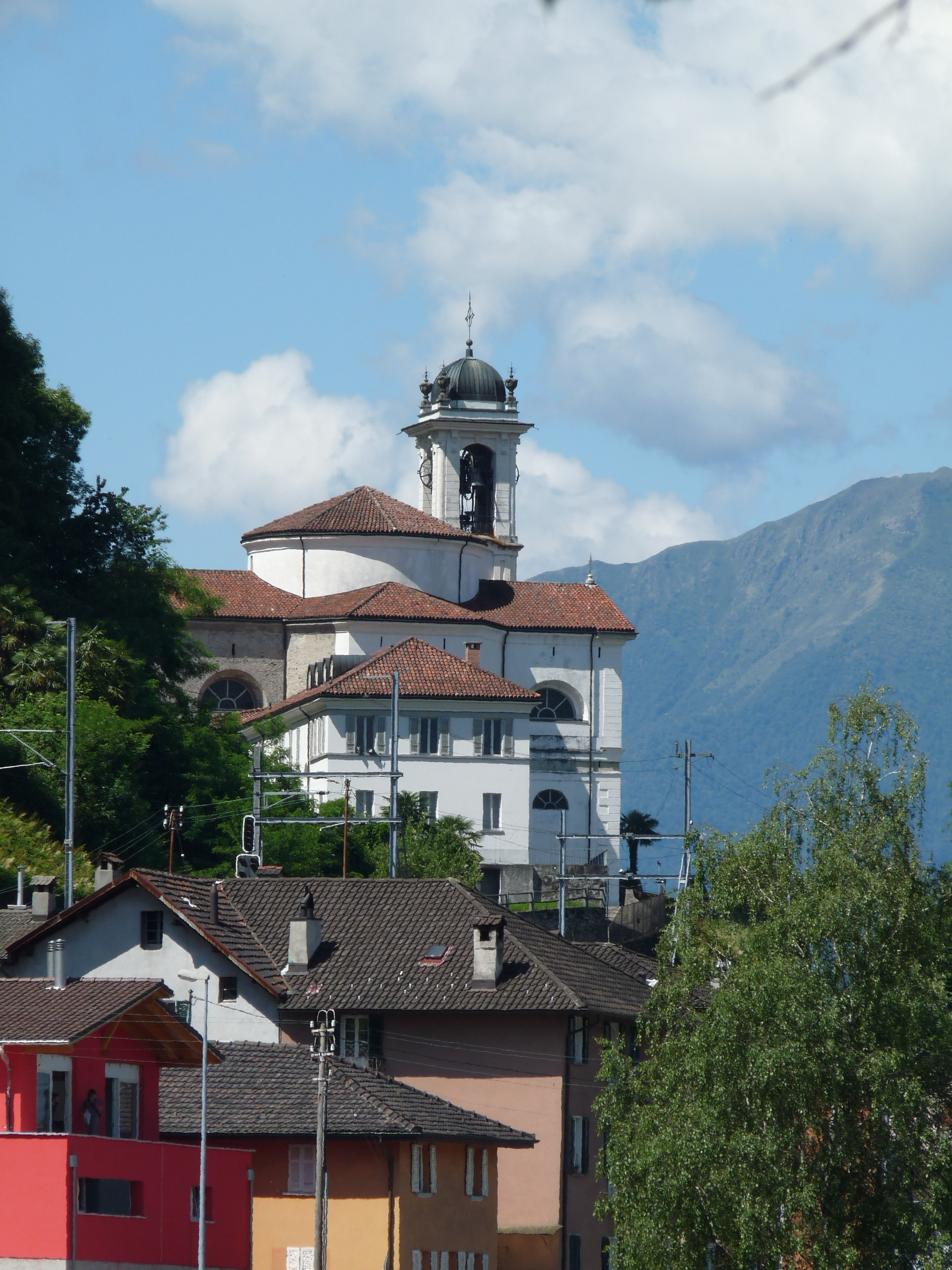
Church of San Carlo in Magadino

During the Late Middle Ages the village was mentioned when certain feudal rights were transferred from the Bishop of Como to the Capitanei of Locarno transferred. Until 1342, these rights included the right to collect tolls on goods traveling through the area. The village of Quartino was, in the 11th to 16th centuries, a Benedictine priory. The priory of St. George belonged to the abbey of S. Benigno di Fruttuaria in Piedmont, then to S. Gemolo di Ganna in Lombardy. In the 17th century the monastic estates came to the hospital in Locarno.

Together with the villages of Quartino and Orgnana, Magadino belonged to the parish of S. Pietro in Vira, until it became an independent parish in 1846. The church of San Carlo was built in 1844–46.

The Codice delle strade di Como (1335) mentions a tower in Magadino, though no trace of the tower has been found. A castle is also mentioned in a chronicle from the 17th century, but it is also lost. The chronicle says it was built in 1365 on the orders of Galeazzo Visconti for the inhabitants of Locarno and destroyed in 1518 by the Swiss.

Magadino was a major port and an important customs station at the transit route north from Lombardy to the cities of the Alps, and its importance grew in 1515 after the collapse of the bridge over the Ticino river at Bellinzona. With the introduction of regular steamship traffic (1826) and the opening of the road over the Gotthard Pass (1830) Magadino became a stop on the coach routes. Many new warehouses, hotels and restaurants were built, some of which are still visible today. The decline of the port began with the opening of the railway lines to Locarno (1874) and Luino (1882). The town stagnated from the 1880s until the 1960s. In 2000, the majority of the population worked outside the village. In 2005, almost half of the jobs were in the services sector.

=== Piazzogna ===
Piazzogna was mentioned between 1542 and 1546 as part of the award given by the local bailiff during arbitration. The arbitration dealt with the rights of neighboring villages to use alpine meadows. Piazzogna belonged first to the municipality and parish of Vira, but by 1704 it had become an independent municipality. However, it didn't become an independent political municipality until 1803.

The original village church of S. Antonio Abate was probably built in the Middle Ages in the romanesque style. However it fell into ruin and collapsed between the 17th and 18th centuries. The parish built a new church in 1752. In the wake of the village's independence from the parish of Vira in 1837, this church was expanded several times in the 19th century.

The hamlet of Alabardia, once part of the parish of San Nazzaro, became widely known in 1783 as the center of Horace-Bénédict de Saussure's barometric experiments conducted around Lake Maggiore.

=== San Nazzaro ===
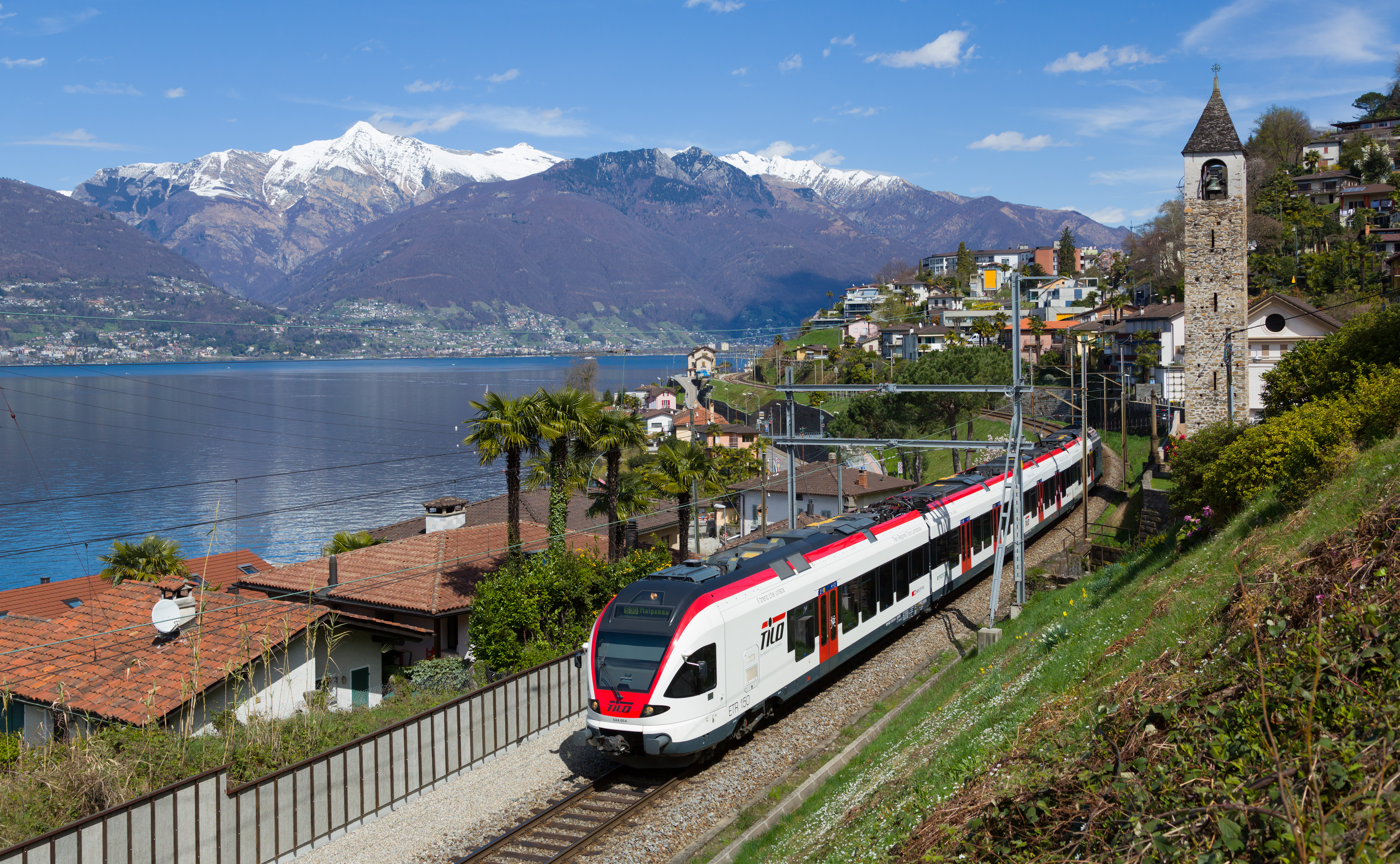
SBB-CFF-FFS RABe 524 train at San Nazzaro

In the hamlet of Vairano, cremation urns have been found which may date back to the Bronze Age cremations. Additionally, Roman era pottery and coins have also been discovered. In the hamlet of Mossana, a number of Roman graves were discovered. In the hamlet of Taverna, there used to stand a tower, which had probably given by Frederick I Barbarossa in 1186 to the Orelli family. The tower later passed into the possession of the nobility of Locarno and was used in the control of trade in the Upper Lake Maggiore and Gambarogno river areas. Even in the Middle Ages it was a center place in the Gambarogno valley. In the 13th century, the Vicinanza meetings were held in the church square in Taverna. In 1487, the Gambarogno became independent of Locarno, and San Nazzaro became the seat of the Podestà and the court.

It was part of the parish of Vira, until it became an independent parish in 1558. The parish church of SS Nazzaro e Celso was first mentioned in 1258. It was rebuilt in 1790 in the classicist style and enlarged.

The population lived, primarily, from agriculture and grazing. The local economy was supplemented in the 15th century by emigration, mostly of bricklayers and builders, to Italy. In the second half of the 20th century, there was a strong population growth, as the village became home to a few tourist hotels and many second homes. In 2000, approximately two thirds of the workers in the municipality were commuters.

=== Sant'Abbondio ===
According to a document from 1358, the settlements of Martignoni de Ronco, Ronco di Sopra, Scimiana, Calgiano, Caviano and Scaiano had already grown up around the church of SS Abbondio e Andrea. The church itself is first mentioned in 1364. It was part of the parish of Vira, when it became the center of an independent parish. In 1774, the villages of Ronco de Martignoni, Ronco di Sopra and Scimiana broke away from Sant'Abbondio to join the vice parish of Gerra. Then, in 1850, they were followed by the settlement of Caviano and Scaiano. The parish church of the new, smaller parish of Sant'Abbondio was rebuilt in the classicist style in 1852–53.

The local economy was based mostly on agriculture and pastoralism. In the 19th century, the emigration of decorators, painters and potters to France, provided another source of income. In the second half of the 20th century, Sant'Abbondio was developed for tourism and many second homes were built in the village.

== Demographics ==
The population (as of 31 December 2020) was 5,163. As of 2013 a total of 20.8% of the population are resident foreign nationals. Over the last 3 years (2010–2013) the population has changed at a rate of 3.8%.

The age distribution, as of 2013, in Gambarogno is; 18.1% of the population are between 0 and 19 years old. Of the adult population, 59.5% of the population are between 20 and 64 years old and 22.5% are 65 or older.

As of 2013, there were 2,287 private households in the municipality. The vacancy rate for the municipality, in 2014, was 0.13%. As of 2012, the construction rate of new housing units was 7.0 new units per 1000 residents.

== Geography ==
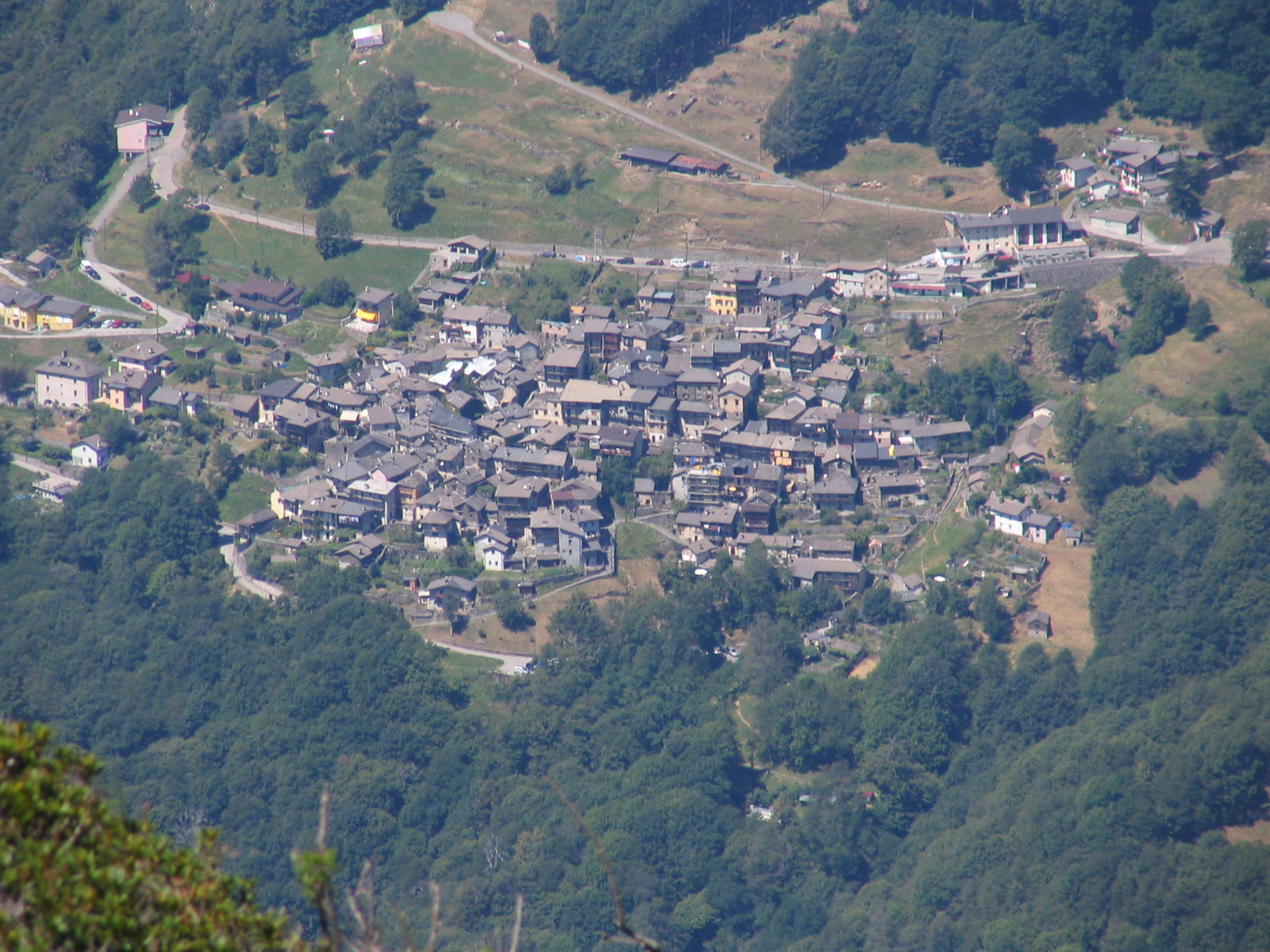
Indemini village high in the upper Valle Veddasca

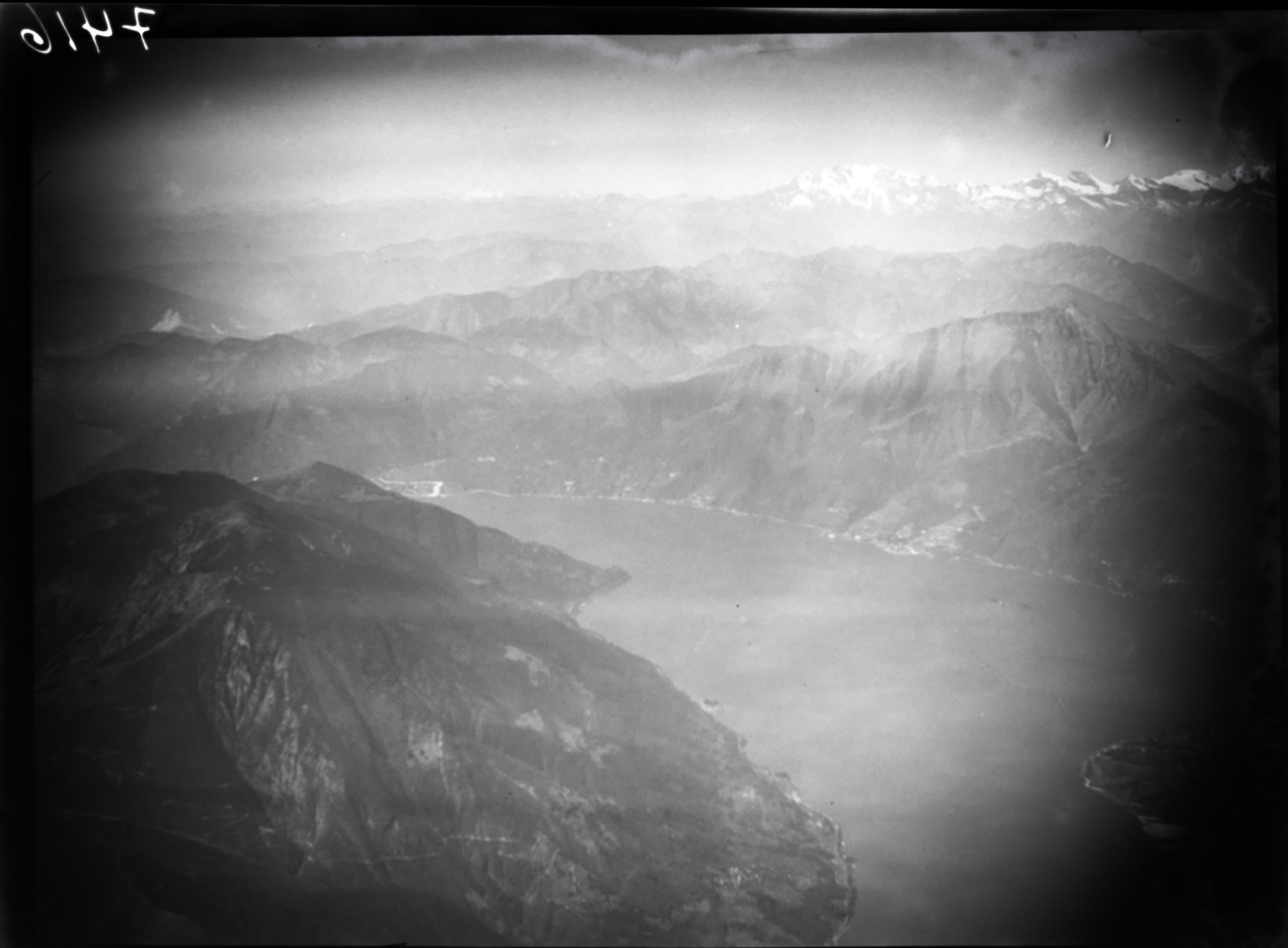
Aerial view by Walter Mittelholzer (1933)

Gambarogno has an area, as of 1997, of 51.8 square kilometers (20.0 sq mi). Of this area, 5.98 km^{2} (2.31 sq mi) or 11.5% is used for agricultural purposes, while 39.43 km^{2} (15.22 sq mi) or 76.1% is forested. Of the rest of the land, 3.87 km^{2} (1.49 sq mi) or 7.5% is settled (buildings or roads), 0.63 km^{2} (0.24 sq mi) or 1.2% is either rivers or lakes and 2.93 km^{2} (1.13 sq mi) or 5.7% is unproductive land.

Of the built up area, housing and buildings made up 4.6% and transportation infrastructure made up 2.1%. Out of the forested land, 64.3% of the total land area is heavily forested and 2.4% is covered with orchards or small clusters of trees. Of the agricultural land, 6.1% is used for growing crops and 4.6% is used for alpine pastures. Of the water in the municipality, 0.4% is in lakes and 0.8% is in rivers and streams. Of the unproductive areas, 4.9% is unproductive vegetation.

== Heritage sites of national significance ==
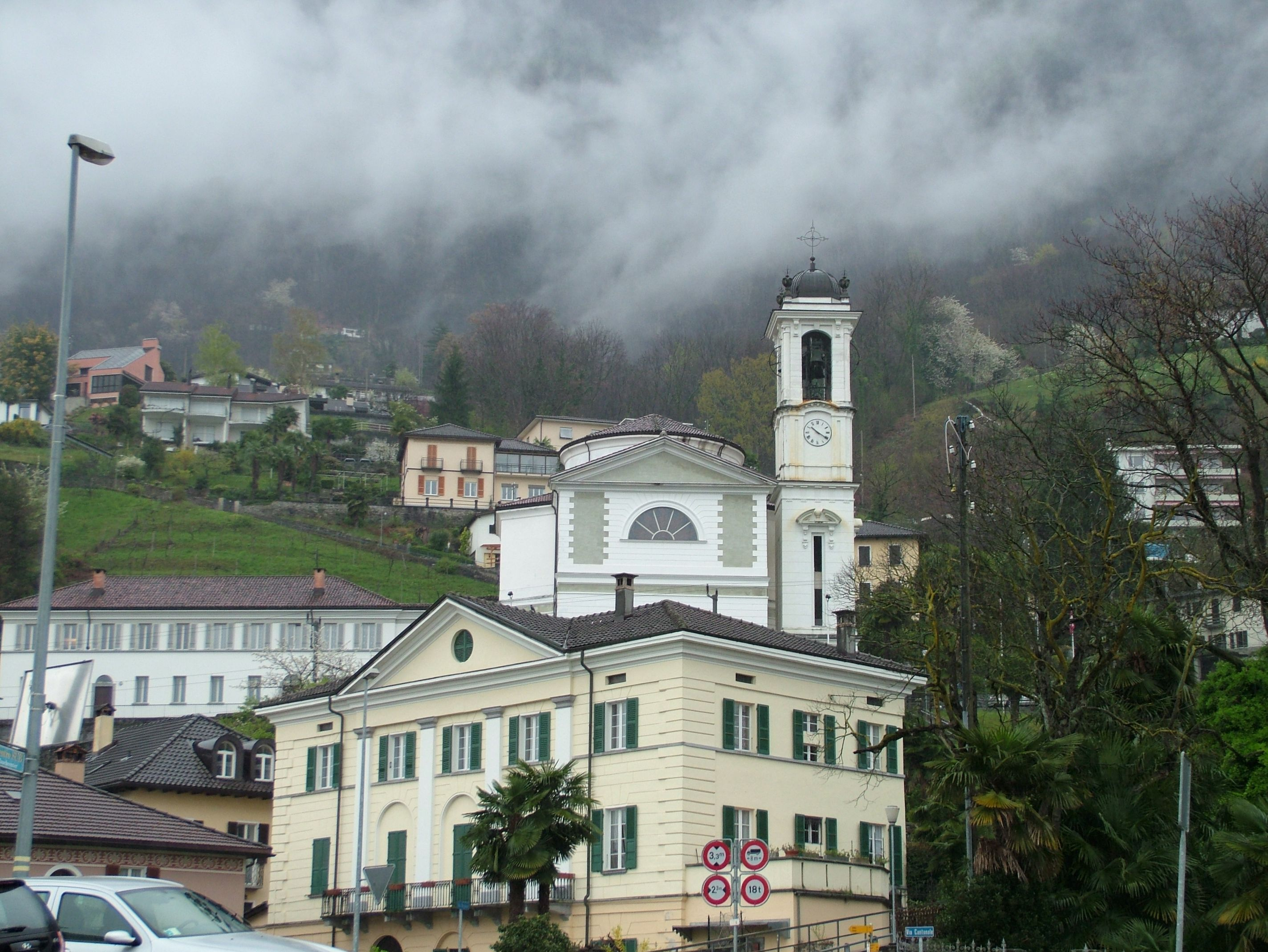
Church of S. Carlo

The Complesso di S. Carlo, a church and parish house, and the Villa Ghisler, both in the village of Magadino, are listed as Swiss heritage site of national significance. The villages of Indemini and Magadino-Rivabella are both listed in the Inventory of Swiss Heritage Sites.

== Historic population ==
The historical population is given in the following table:

Year	Population Entire Valley	Population Caviano	Population Contone	Population Gerra (Gambarogno)	Population Indemini	Population Magadino	Population Piazzogna	Population San Nazzaro	Population Sant'Abbondio
1591	-	59 Hearths	70	27 Hearths	c. 200	-	-	375	825
1683	-	-	71	-	376	-	-	346	850
1795	-	-	71	-	-	-	-	340	500
1801	2,321	-	-	405	287	-	-	-	-
1850	3,683	332	139	651	409	586	221	477	251
1900	3,078	272	199	451	340	725	152	314	170
1950	2,892	184	305	330	206	821	185	291	116
1990	-	-	430	-	-	-	264	-	-
2000	4,348	111	703	254	39	1,449	362	641	123

== Politics ==
In the 2011 federal election the most popular party was the FDP which received 26.5% of the vote. The next three most popular parties were the CVP (20.2%), the SP (17.2%) and smaller, local parties with 14.3% of the vote.

== Economy ==
As of 2012, there were 67 people employed in the primary economic sector and about 23 businesses involved in this sector. A total of 835 people were employed in the secondary sector and there were 112 businesses in this sector. Finally, 1,360 people were employed in the tertiary sector, with 354 businesses in this sector.

== Climate ==
Between 1961 and 1990 Magadino village in Gambarogno had an average of 103 days of rain or snow per year and on average received 1,772 mm (69.8 in) of precipitation. The wettest month was May during which time Magadino received an average of 211 mm (8.3 in) of rain or snow. During this month there was precipitation for an average of 12.9 days. The driest month of the year was December with an average of 67 mm (2.6 in) of precipitation over 5.5 days.

Climate data for Magadino/Cadenazzo(1981-2010)
Month	Jan	Feb	Mar	Apr	May	Jun	Jul	Aug	Sep	Oct	Nov	Dec	Year
Mean daily maximum °C (°F)	6.1 (43.0)	8.6 (47.5)	13.8 (56.8)	16.9 (62.4)	21.2 (70.2)	25.1 (77.2)	27.6 (81.7)	26.7 (80.1)	22.2 (72.0)	16.7 (62.1)	10.8 (51.4)	6.5 (43.7)	16.9 (62.4)
Daily mean °C (°F)	0.9 (33.6)	3.0 (37.4)	7.9 (46.2)	11.5 (52.7)	15.7 (60.3)	19.5 (67.1)	21.7 (71.1)	20.8 (69.4)	16.7 (62.1)	11.6 (52.9)	5.8 (42.4)	1.7 (35.1)	11.4 (52.5)
Mean daily minimum °C (°F)	−3.4 (25.9)	−2.0 (28.4)	1.7 (35.1)	5.5 (41.9)	10.4 (50.7)	13.8 (56.8)	15.8 (60.4)	15.3 (59.5)	11.6 (52.9)	7.0 (44.6)	1.4 (34.5)	−2.5 (27.5)	6.2 (43.2)
Average precipitation mm (inches)	70 (2.8)	59 (2.3)	91 (3.6)	188 (7.4)	227 (8.9)	186 (7.3)	164 (6.5)	178 (7.0)	220 (8.7)	186 (7.3)	173 (6.8)	89 (3.5)	1,832 (72.1)
Average snowfall cm (inches)	14 (5.5)	3.9 (1.5)	0.9 (0.4)	0 (0)	0 (0)	0 (0)	0 (0)	0 (0)	0 (0)	0 (0)	0.2 (0.1)	11.1 (4.4)	30.1 (11.9)
Average precipitation days (≥ 1.0 mm)	4.7	4.3	6.1	10.2	12.6	10.2	8.6	9.7	8.4	9.4	8.0	6.4	98.6
Average snowy days (≥ 1.0 cm)	1.3	1	0.3	0	0	0	0	0	0	0	0.1	1.2	3.9
Average relative humidity (%)	76	70	62	66	70	69	69	72	76	81	78	78	72
Mean monthly sunshine hours	128	139	186	179	191	228	261	243	189	143	111	104	2,102
Source: MeteoSwiss

== Education ==
The municipal preschool/primary school system is headquartered in San Nazzaro. There are four preschool sites: Contone, Gerra. Quartino-Cadepezzo, and Vira; and four primary school sites: Contone, Quartino-Cadepezzo, San Nazzaro, and Vira.

The municipal library, Biblioteca comunale Gambarogno in San Nazzaro, opened in 2014. There is also a toy library (ludoteca) in San Nazzaro, which opened in 1997.

== Transportation ==
The municipality has five railway stations: Gerra (Gambarogno), Magadino-Vira, Quartino, Ranzo-Sant'Abbondio, and San Nazzaro. All five are located on the Cadenazzo–Luino line with regular service to Cadenazzo, Luino, and Gallarate.

== Crime ==
In 2014 the crime rate, of the over 200 crimes listed in the Swiss Criminal Code (running from murder, robbery and assault to accepting bribes and election fraud), in Gambarogno was 51.3 per thousand residents. This rate is lower than average, at only 61.2% of the rate in the district and 53.4% of the cantonal rate. During the same period, the rate of drug crimes was 8.1 per thousand residents. This rate is also lower than average, with only 50.6% of the rate in the canton. The rate of violations of immigration, visa and work permit laws was 3.9 per thousand residents, also lower than average at only 63.9% of the rate in the district and only 52.0% of the rate in the canton.
