= Quartino =

Quartino may refer to:

- Quartino, Ticino, a small village in Magadino, Switzerland
- E-flat clarinet or quartino

== People with the surname ==
- José N. Quartino, designer of the Club de Pescadores in Buenos Aires, Argentina
