= Gerra (Gambarogno) railway station =

Railway station in Switzerland

Gerra (Gambarogno)
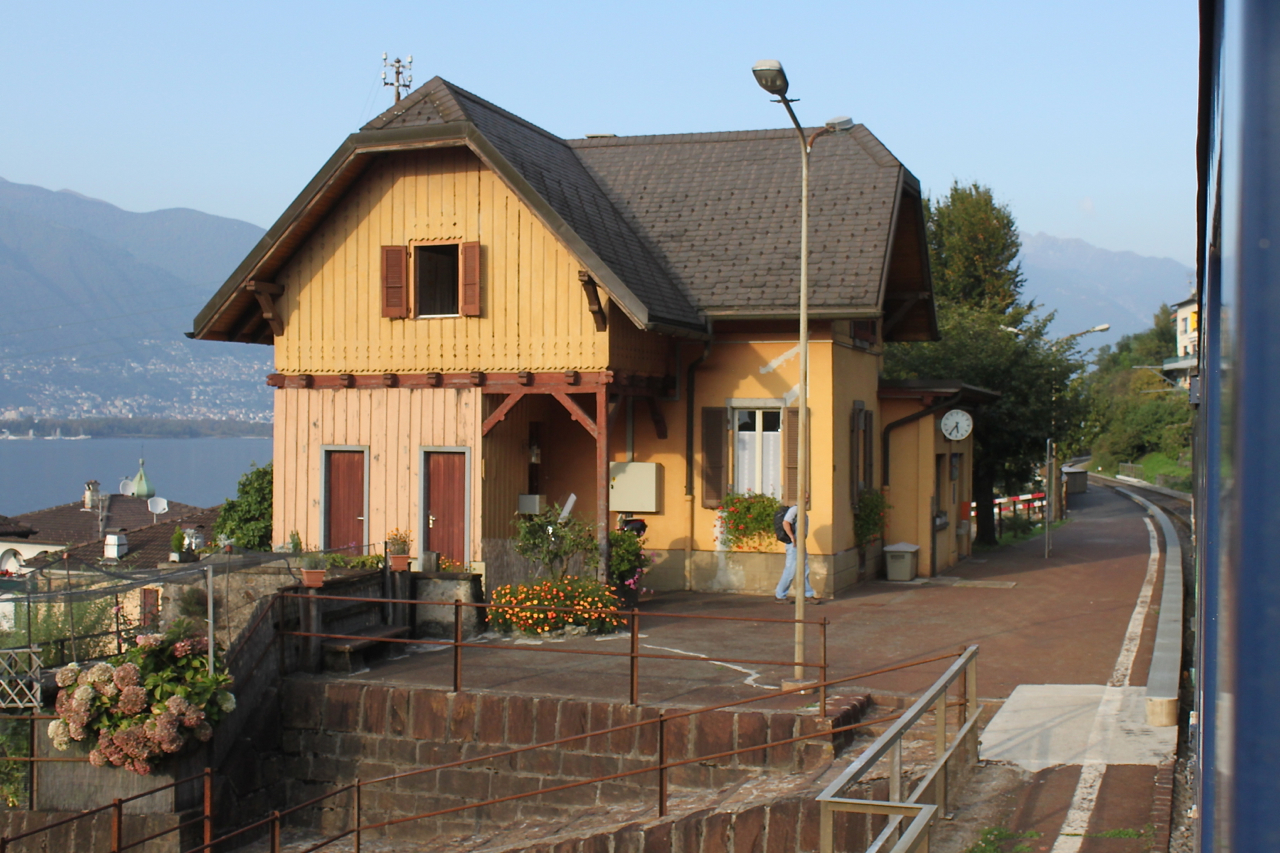
- The station building in 2011

General information
- Location: Gambarogno; Switzerland
- Coordinates: 46°07′19″N 8°47′06″E
- Elevation: 222 m (728 ft)
- Owner: Swiss Federal Railways
- Line: Cadenazzo–Luino line
- Distance: 172.8 km (107.4 mi) from Immensee
- Train operators: Treni Regionali Ticino Lombardia
- Connections: Autopostale buses

Other information
- Fare zone: 313 (arcobaleno)

Passengers
- 2018: 50 per weekday

Services
Preceding station	TiLo	Following station
San Nazzaro towards Cadenazzo	S30	Ranzo-Sant'Abbondio towards Gallarate
Location

Gerra (Gambarogno) railway station (Italian: Stazione di Gerra (Gambarogno)) is a railway station in the municipality of Gambarogno, in the Swiss canton of Ticino. It is an intermediate stop on the standard gauge Cadenazzo–Luino line of Swiss Federal Railways.

== Services ==
As of the December 2021 timetable change, the following services stop at Gerra (Gambarogno):

- S30: service every two hours between Cadenazzo and Luino or Gallarate.
