= Quartino, Ticino =

Village in Magadino, Ticino, Switzerland

Coordinates: 46.15°N 8.896°E

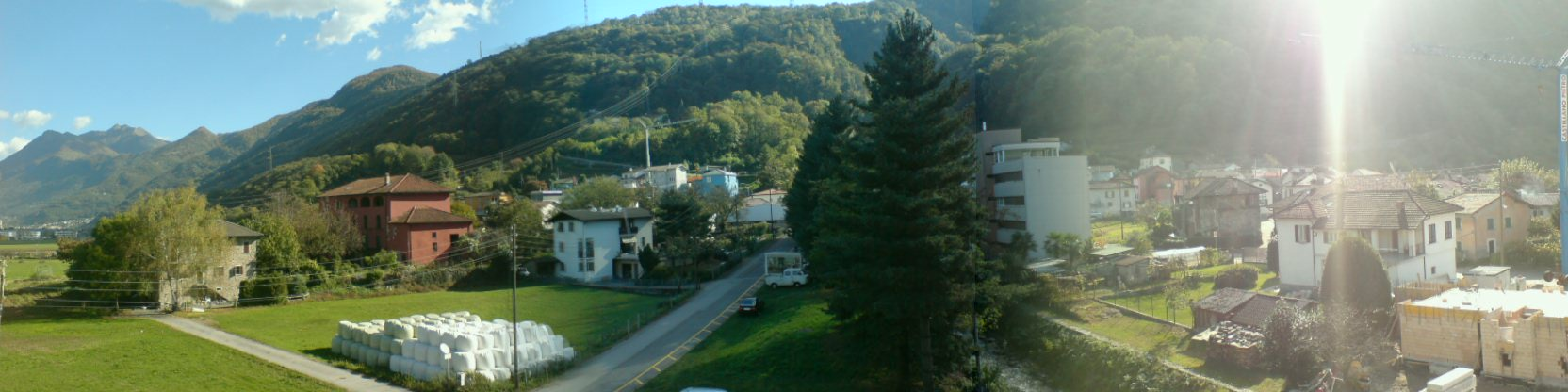

Quartino is a small village in Magadino, Ticino, Switzerland.

== Infrastructure and transport ==
=== Roads ===
Quartino is an important road junction. The settlement is crossed by main road 406, part of the N13 national road, which connects Bellinzona and Locarno. It is also the starting point of main road 405, which runs towards Luino.

=== Railways ===
Quartino is served by Quartino railway station, located on the Cadenazzo–Luino railway line. The station is served by TILO's S30 regional service.
