= Magadino-Vira railway station =

Railway station in Switzerland

Magadino-Vira
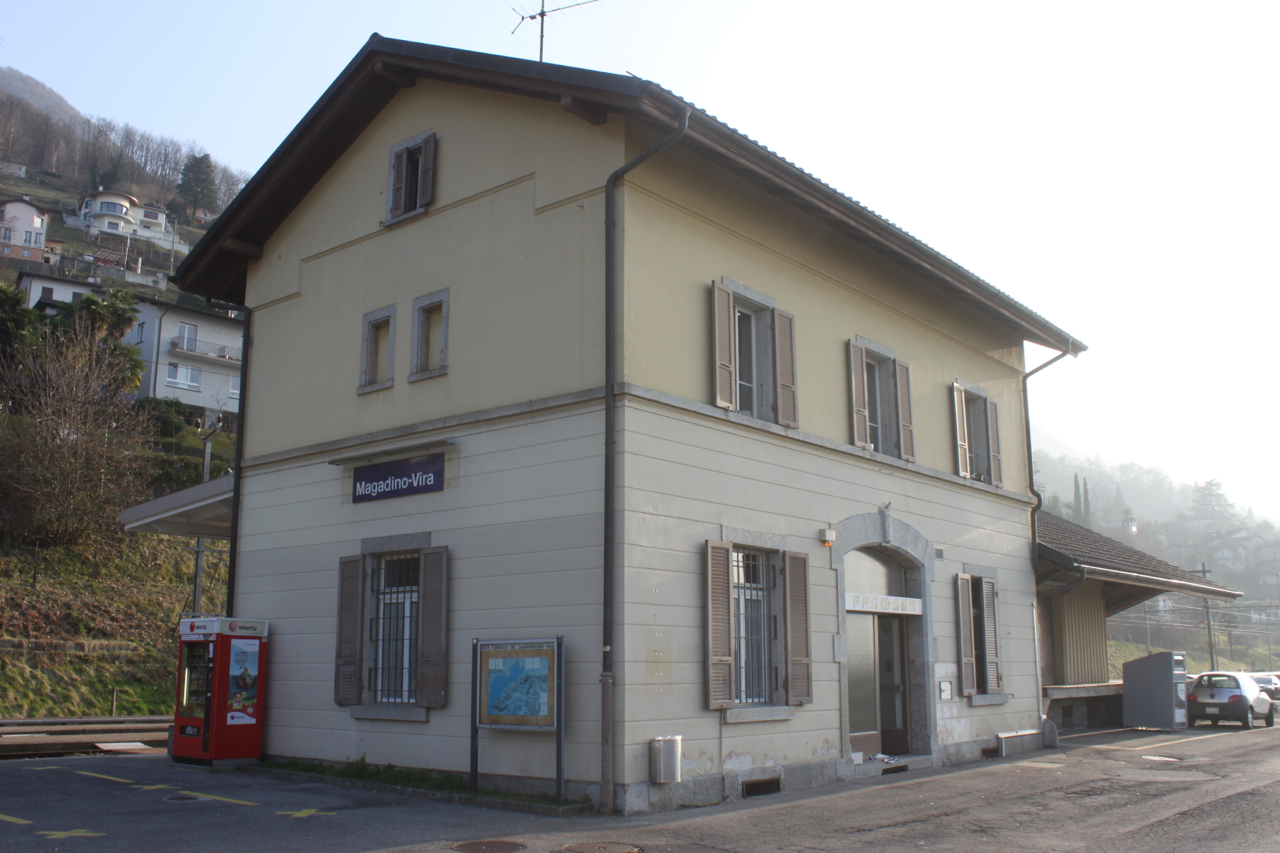
- The station building in 2014

General information
- Location: Gambarogno; Switzerland
- Coordinates: 46°08′43″N 8°51′01″E
- Elevation: 215 m (705 ft)
- Owner: Swiss Federal Railways
- Line: Cadenazzo–Luino line
- Distance: 167.0 km (103.8 mi) from Immensee
- Train operators: Treni Regionali Ticino Lombardia
- Connections: Autopostale buses

Other information
- Fare zone: 310 and 313 (arcobaleno)

Passengers
- 2018: 60 per weekday

Services
| Preceding station | TiLo | Following station |
|---|---|---|
| Quartino towards Cadenazzo | S30 | San Nazzaro towards Gallarate |
Location

Magadino-Vira railway station (Italian: Stazione di Magadino-Vira) is a railway station in the municipality of Gambarogno, in the Swiss canton of Ticino. It is an intermediate stop on the standard gauge Cadenazzo–Luino line of Swiss Federal Railways.

== Services ==
As of the December 2021 timetable change, the following services stop at Magadino-Vira:

- S30: service every two hours between Cadenazzo and Luino or Gallarate.
