= Ranzo-Sant'Abbondio railway station =

Railway station in Switzerland

Ranzo-Sant'Abbondio
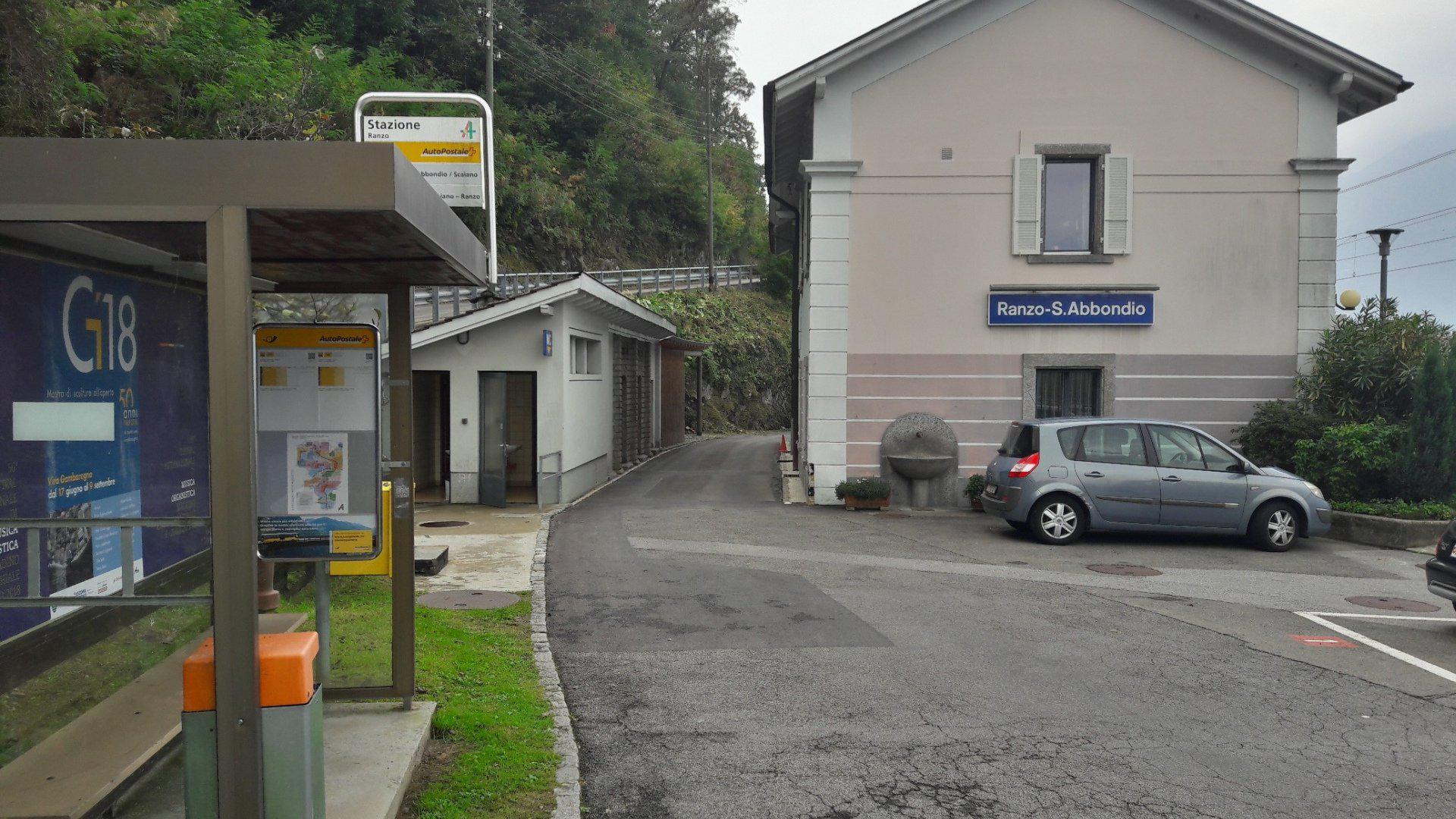
- The station building in 2018

General information
- Location: Gambarogno; Switzerland
- Coordinates: 46°07′01″N 8°46′35″E
- Elevation: 220 m (720 ft)
- Owner: Swiss Federal Railways
- Line: Cadenazzo–Luino line
- Distance: 175.9 km (109.3 mi) from Immensee
- Train operators: Treni Regionali Ticino Lombardia
- Connections: Autopostale buses

Other information
- Fare zone: 122 (arcobaleno)

Passengers
- 2018: 50 per weekday

Services
Preceding station	TiLo	Following station
Gerra (Gambarogno) towards Cadenazzo	S30	Pino-Tronzano towards Gallarate
Location

Ranzo-Sant'Abbondio railway station (Italian: Stazione di Ranzo-Sant'Abbondio) is a railway station in the municipality of Gambarogno, in the Swiss canton of Ticino. It is an intermediate stop on the standard gauge Cadenazzo–Luino line of Swiss Federal Railways and is final station north of the border between Switzerland and Italy.

== Services ==
As of the December 2021 timetable change, the following services stop at Ranzo-Sant'Abbondio:

- S30: service every two hours between Cadenazzo and Luino or Gallarate.
