= Quartino railway station =

Railway station in Switzerland

Quartino
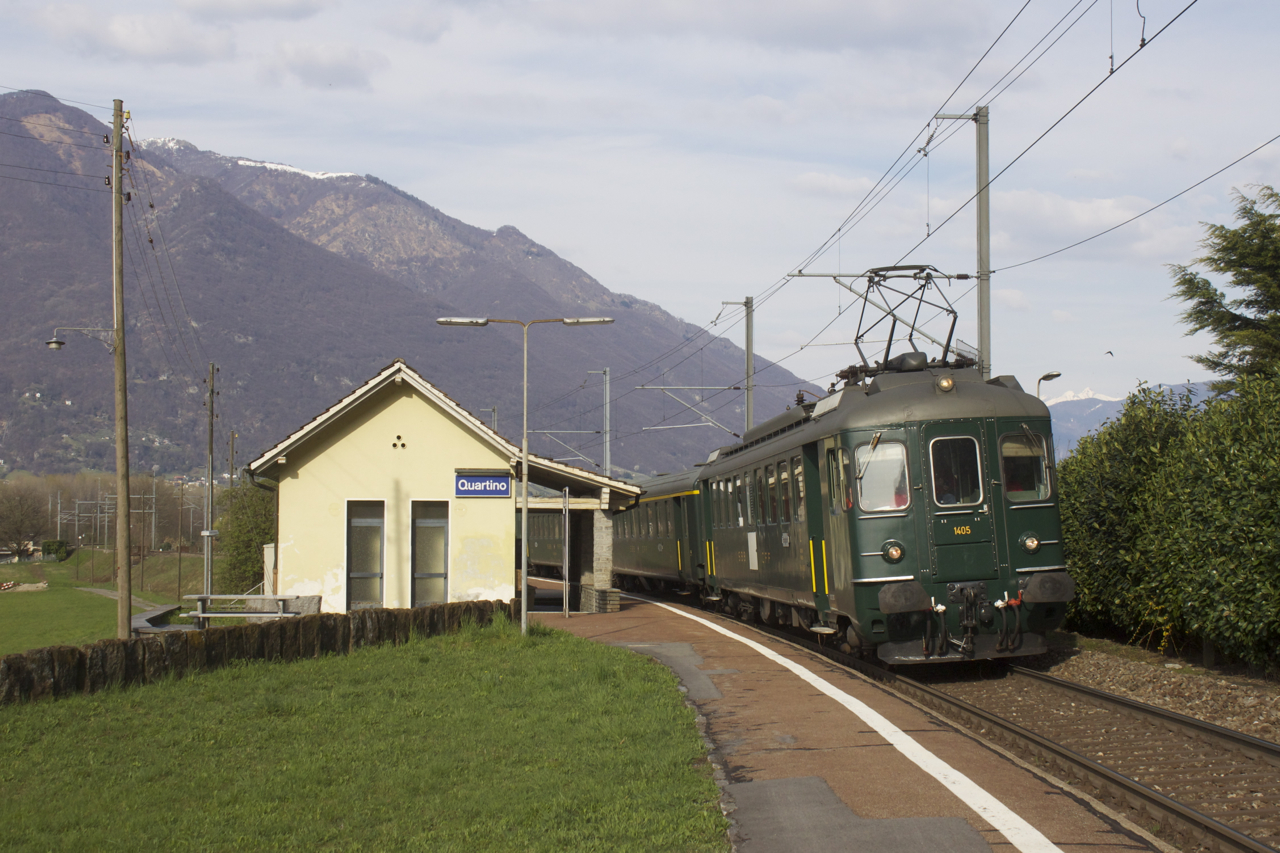
- An SBB RBe 4/4 at the station in 2014

General information
- Location: Gambarogno; Switzerland
- Coordinates: 46°09′05″N 8°53′14″E
- Elevation: 202 m (663 ft)
- Owner: Swiss Federal Railways
- Line: Cadenazzo–Luino line
- Distance: 164.0 km (101.9 mi) from Immensee
- Train operators: Treni Regionali Ticino Lombardia
- Connections: Autopostale buses

Other information
- Fare zone: 310 (arcobaleno)

Passengers
- 2018: 50 per weekday

Services
Preceding station	TiLo	Following station
Cadenazzo Terminus	S30	Magadino-Vira towards Gallarate
Location

Quartino railway station (Italian: Stazione di Quartino) is a railway station in the municipality of Gambarogno, in the Swiss canton of Ticino. It is an intermediate stop on the standard gauge Cadenazzo–Luino line of Swiss Federal Railways.

== Services ==
As of the December 2021 timetable change, the following services stop at Quartino:

- S30: service every two hours between Cadenazzo and Luino or Gallarate.
