= Funivia di Monteviasco =

Cable car in Italy

Coordinates: 46°4′22.123″N 8°49′14.848″E

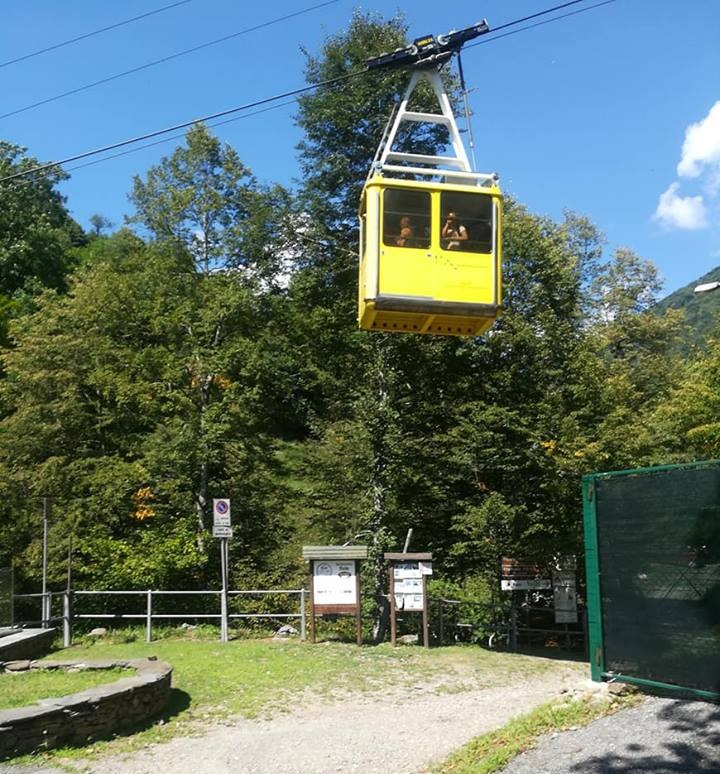
Running car near the base station.

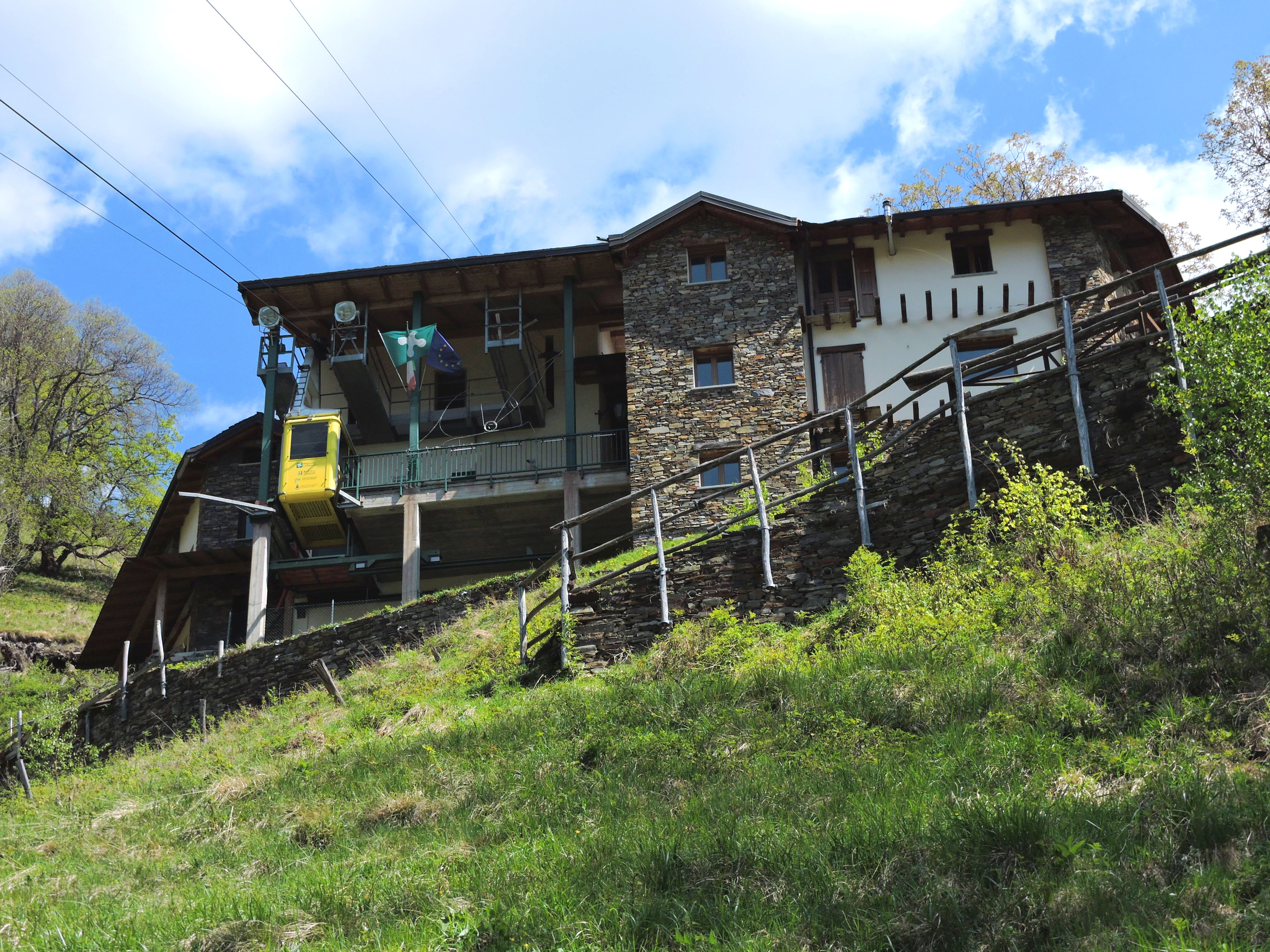
Monteviasco: arrival station of the Ponte di Piero-Monteviasco cableway

The Funivia di Monteviasco (Monteviasco Ropeway) is a passenger cable car connecting Ponte di Piero and Monteviasco, in the Italian comune of Curiglia con Monteviasco (province of Varese).

The cable car was built and inaugurated in 1989 in order to break the isolation of the village of Monteviasco in val Veddasca (a valley near the Lago Maggiore), which is not reached by driveways or railways and was previously accessible only by a couple of steep footpaths.

The base station in Ponte di Piero is at an altitude of 543m, with the top station in Monteviasco at 943m. The cable car climbs with an ascension of 400m in an overall length of 981m.

The cableway features a single car carrying 15 people; the service runs year-round, with different timetables depending from the season.

Tickets are sold in both stations; the prices are set by the regional authority of Lombardy, because the cableway is part of the public transport network.

Since November 12, 2018 the cableway is out of order, following a fatal accident which caused the death of a maintenance technician.

Cableway operations were resumed in August 2025.
