= Curiglia con Monteviasco =

- Comune
- Comune di Curiglia con Monteviasco
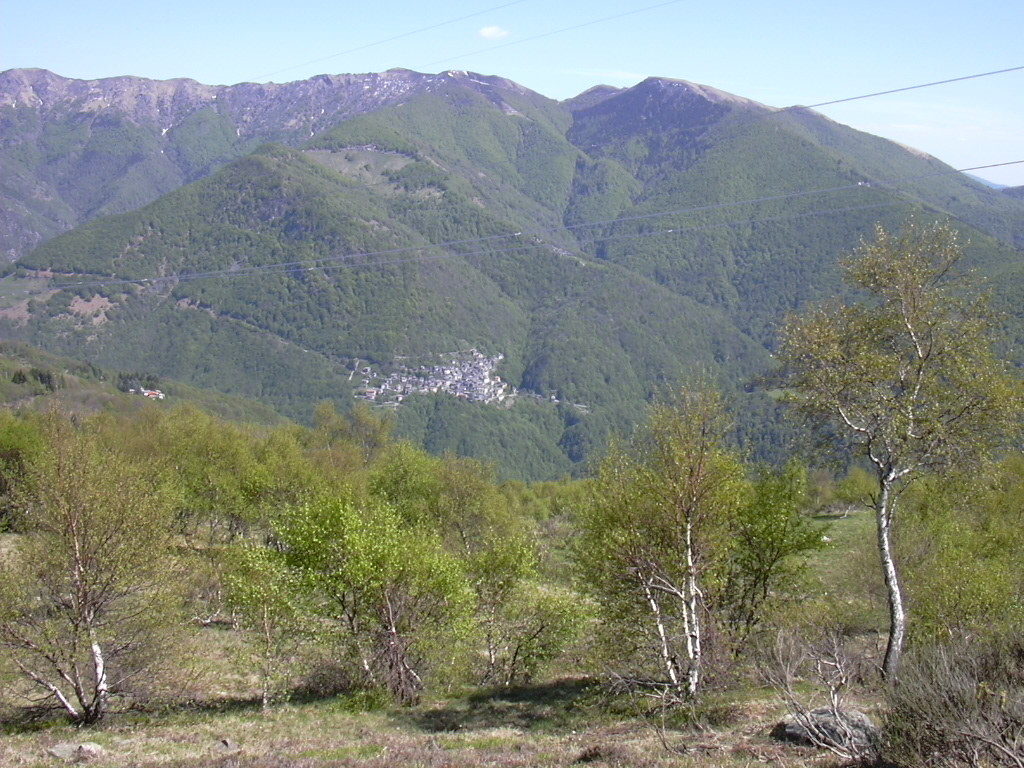

- Coat of arms

- Location within Italy Location within Lombardy
- Coordinates: 46°3′N 8°48′E
- Country: Italy
- Region: Lombardy
- Province: Varese (VA)
- Frazioni: Curiglia, Monteviasco, Sarona, Alpone, Piero, Viasco, Mulini, Alpe Polusa, Alpe Fontanella, Alpe Cortetti, Alpe Cà del Sasso, Madonna della Guardia, Alpe Rattaiola, Alpe Corte, Alpe Merigetto, Ponte di Piero, Alpe rivo, Alpe Pian Cavurico, Monte Lema

Government
  - Mayor: Nora Sahnane

Area
  - Total: 11.3 km^{2} (4.4 sq mi)
- Elevation: 670 m (2,200 ft)

Population (Dec. 2004)
  - Total: 189
  - Density: 16.7/km^{2} (43.3/sq mi)
- Demonym: Curigliesi
- Time zone: UTC+1 (CET)
  - Summer (DST): UTC+2 (CEST)
- Postal code: 21010
- Dialing code: 0332

Curiglia con Monteviasco is a comune (municipality) in the Province of Varese in the Italian region Lombardy, located about 110 kilometres (68 mi) northwest of Milan and about 70 kilometres (43 mi) northwest of Varese in the Val Veddasca, on the border with Switzerland. The municipal seat is in Curiglia.

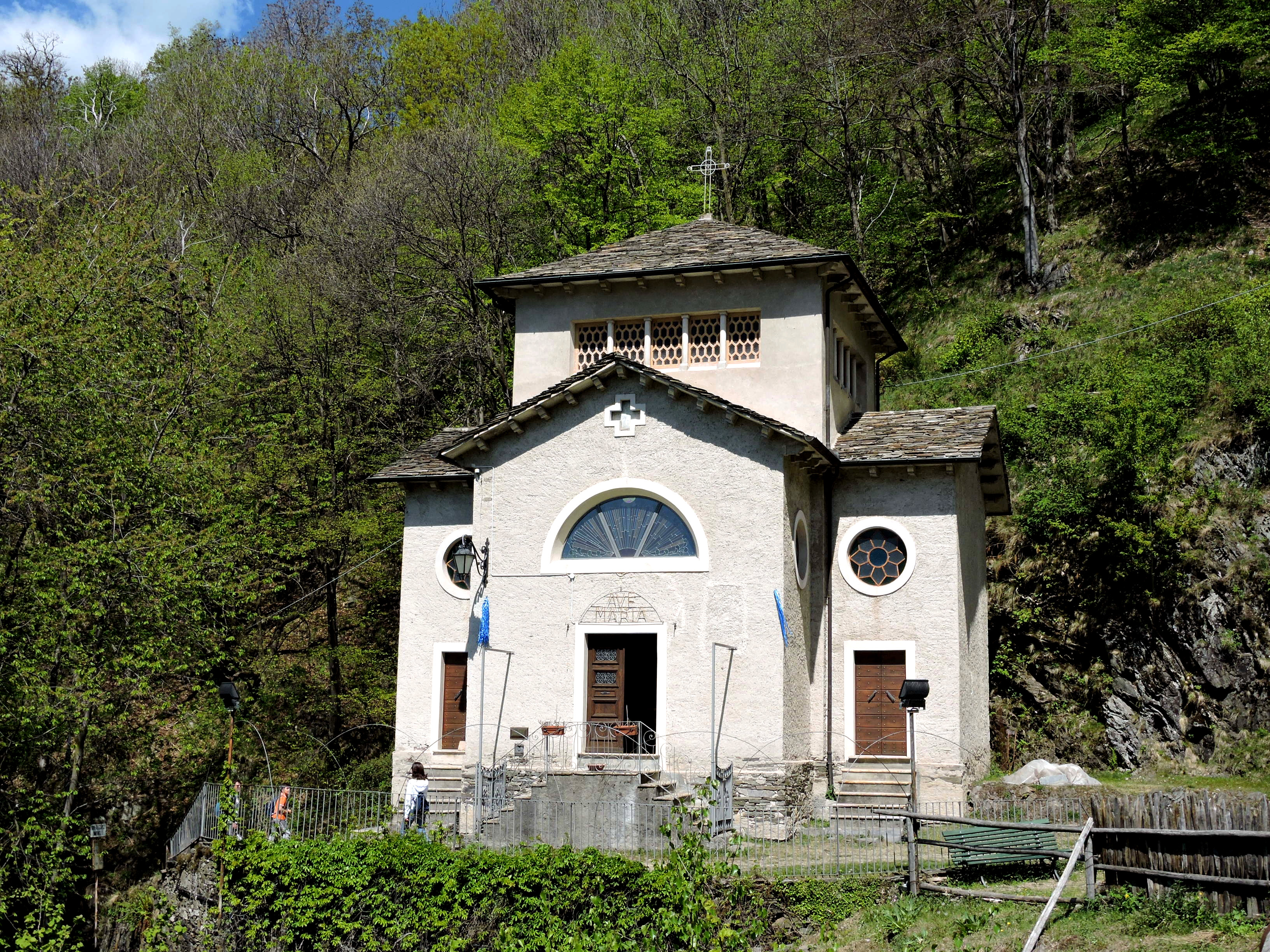
Monteviasco: Church of Madonna della Serta

== See also ==
- Funivia di Monteviasco
