= Cadenazzo–Luino railway =

Railway line in Switzerland and Italy

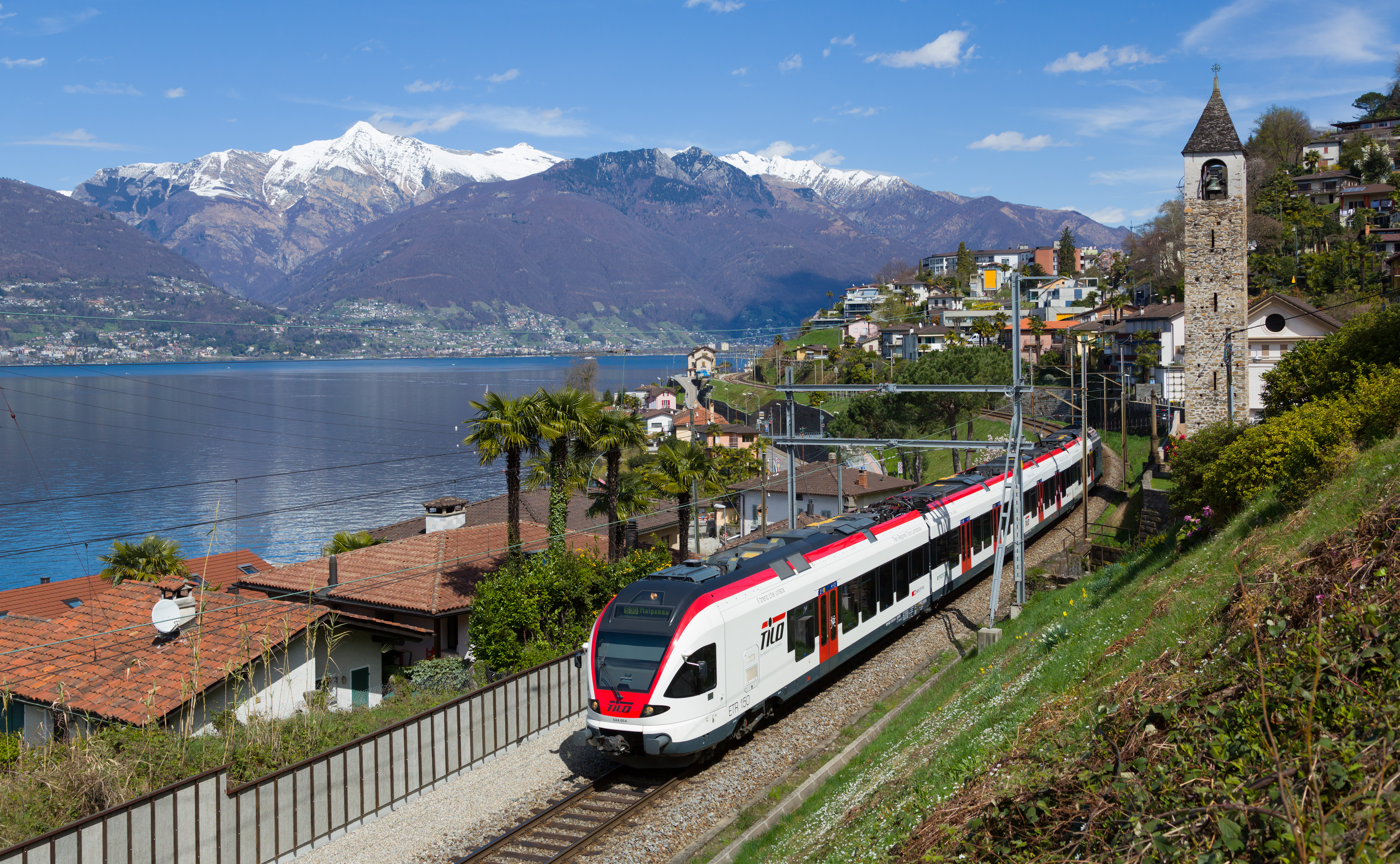

Overview
- Status: in use
- Owner: Swiss Federal Railways
- Locale: Switzerland, Italy
- Termini: Cadenazzo; Luino

Service
- Type: Heavy rail
- Operator: TiLo

History
- Opened: December 4, 1882

Technical
- Track gauge: 1,435 mm (4 ft 8 1/2 in) standard gauge
- Electrification: 15 kV 16.7 Hz AC, overhead line

The Cadenazzo–Luino railway is a railway line along the northeastern coast of Lago Maggiore. It conntects the towns of Cadenazzo and Luino, crossing the Italy–Switzerland border.

== History ==
The line was opened on 4 December 1882 by the Gotthardbahn. On 1 May 1909 it became part of the Swiss Federal Railways. It was electrified on 11 June 1960.

== Service ==
The railway is served by the S30, operated by TiLo.
