= Equestrian at the 1992 Summer Olympics – Individual dressage =

Equestrian at the Olympics

Individual dressage at the Games of the XXV Olympiad
- Venue: Real Club de Polo de Barcelona
- Date: 2–5 August
- Competitors: 48 from 18 nations

Medalists
1st place, gold medalist(s)		Nicole Uphoff	Germany
2nd place, silver medalist(s)		Isabell Werth	Germany
3rd place, bronze medalist(s)		Klaus Balkenhol	Germany

The individual dressage event was one of six equestrian events on the Equestrian at the 1992 Summer Olympics programme. The competition was held at the Royal Polo Club in Barcelona.

The competition was split into two phases:

1. Grand Prix (2–3 August)
  Riders performed the Grand Prix test. The sixteen riders with the highest scores advanced to the final (maximum 3 per nation).
2. Grand Prix Special (5 August)
  Riders performed the Grand Prix Special test.

== Results ==
Rank	Rider	Horse	Grand Prix		Grand Prix Special
Rank	Rider	Horse	Points	Rank	Points
1st place, gold medalist(s)	Nicole Uphoff (GER)	Rembrandt	1768	1	1626
2nd place, silver medalist(s)	Isabell Werth (GER)	Gigolo	1762	2	1551
3rd place, bronze medalist(s)	Klaus Balkenhol (GER)	Goldstern	1694	3	1515
4	Anky van Grunsven (NED)	Bonfire	1631	5	1447
5	Kyra Kyrklund (FIN)	Edinburg	1571	9	1428
6	Carol Lavell (USA)	Gifted	1629	6	1408
7	Pia Laus (ITA)	Adrett	1571	9	1389
8	Elisabeth Max-Theurer (AUT)	Liechtenstein	1585	7	1380
9	Ellen Bontje (NED)	Olympic Larius	1577	8	1361
10	Anne van Olst (DEN)	Chevalier	1542	13	1358
11	Anna Merveldt (IRL)	Rapallo	1527	16	1355
12	Christilot Hanson-Boylen (CAN)	Biraldo	1543	12	1347
13	Anne Grethe Törnblad (DEN)	Ravel	1540	14	1334
14	Otto Hofer (SUI)	Renzo	1548	11	1328
15	Tineke Bartels (NED)	Olympic Courage	1534	15	1302
16	Carl Hester (GBR)	Giorgione	1523	17	1254
17	Monica Theodorescu (GER)	Grunox	1676	4	Did not advance
18	Tinne Vilhelmson-Silfvén (SWE)	Caprice	1522	18	Did not advance
19	Margit Otto-Crépin (FRA)	Maritim	1521	19	Did not advance
20	Ann Behrenfors (SWE)	Leroy	1514	20	Did not advance
21	Emile Faurie (GBR)	Virtu	1513	21	Did not advance
22	Charlotte Bredahl (USA)	Monsieur	1507	22	Did not advance
22	Robert Dover (USA)	Lectron	1507	22	Did not advance
24	Annica Westerberg (SWE)	Taktik	1501	24	Did not advance
25	Ruth Hunkeler (SUI)	Afghadi	1498	25	Did not advance
25	Catherine Durand (FRA)	Orphée	1498	25	Did not advance
27	Michael Poulin (USA)	Graf George	1495	27	Did not advance
28	Christine Doan (AUS)	Dondolo	1491	28	Did not advance
29	Laura Fry (GBR)	Quarryman	1486	29	Did not advance
29	Suzanne Dunkley (BER)	Highness	1486	29	Did not advance
31	Paolo Giani Margi (ITA)	Destino di Acciarella	1481	31	Did not advance
32	Doris Ramseier (SUI)	Renatus	1478	32	Did not advance
33	Carol Parsons (GBR)	Vashkar	1468	33	Did not advance
34	Cindy Neale-Ishoy (CAN)	Dakar	1466	34	Did not advance
35	Eva Karin Oscarsson-Göthberg (SWE)	Little Claus	1460	35	Did not advance
36	Lene Hoberg (DEN)	Bayard	1451	36	Did not advance
37	Serge Cornut (FRA)	Olifant Charrière	1444	37	Did not advance
38	Inna Zhurakovska (EUN)	Podgon	1443	38	Did not advance
39	Daria Fantoni (ITA)	Sonny Boy	1439	39	Did not advance
39	Annemarie Sanders-Keyzer (NED)	Olympic Montreux	1436	39	Did not advance
41	Yoshinaga Sakurai (JPN)	Matador	1435	41	Did not advance
42	Dominique d'Esmé (FRA)	Rapport II	1427	42	Did not advance
43	Juan Matute (ESP)	N'Est Pas	1426	43	Did not advance
44	Olga Klimko (EUN)	Shipovnik	1420	44	Did not advance
45	Laura Conz Dall'Ora (ITA)	Lahti	1419	45	Did not advance
46	Bent Jensen (DEN)	Ariston	1411	46	Did not advance
47	Irina Zuykova (EUN)	Barin	1340	47	Did not advance
48	Martina Pracht (CAN)	Emirage	1313	48	Did not advance
