= Equestrian at the 1992 Summer Olympics – Team dressage =

Equestrian at the Olympics

Team dressage at the Games of the XXV Olympiad
- Venue: Real Club de Polo de Barcelona
- Date: 2 August
- Competitors: 41 (11 teams) from 11 nations

Medalists
1st place, gold medalist(s)		Nicole Uphoff; Isabell Werth; Klaus Balkenhol; Monica Theodorescu	Germany
2nd place, silver medalist(s)		Anky van Grunsven; Ellen Bontje; Tineke Bartels; Annemarie Sanders-Keyzer	Netherlands
3rd place, bronze medalist(s)		Carol Lavell; Charlotte Bredahl; Robert Dover; Michael Poulin	United States

The team dressage event was one of six equestrian events on the Equestrian at the 1992 Summer Olympics programme. The competition was held at the Royal Polo Club in Barcelona.

The competition consisted of one phase:

1. Grand Prix (2–3 August)
  All team members performed the Grand Prix test. The three highest scores of each team were summed to determine the placings.

== Results ==
Rank	Country			Total
Rank	Rider	Horse	Score	Total
1st place, gold medalist(s)	Germany			5224
1st place, gold medalist(s)	Nicole Uphoff	Rembrandt	1768	5224
1st place, gold medalist(s)	Isabell Werth	Gigolo	1762	5224
1st place, gold medalist(s)	Klaus Balkenhol	Goldstern	1694	5224
1st place, gold medalist(s)	Monica Theodorescu	Grunox	1676	5224
2nd place, silver medalist(s)	Netherlands			4742
2nd place, silver medalist(s)	Anky van Grunsven	Bonfire	1631	4742
2nd place, silver medalist(s)	Ellen Bontje	Olympic Larius	1577	4742
2nd place, silver medalist(s)	Tineke Bartels	Olympic Courage	1534	4742
2nd place, silver medalist(s)	Annemarie Sanders-Keyzer	Olympic Montreux	1436	4742
3rd place, bronze medalist(s)	United States			4634
3rd place, bronze medalist(s)	Carol Lavell	Gifted	1629	4634
3rd place, bronze medalist(s)	Charlotte Bredahl	Monsieur	1507	4634
3rd place, bronze medalist(s)	Robert Dover	Lectron	1507	4634
3rd place, bronze medalist(s)	Michael Poulin	Graf George	1495	4634
4	Sweden			4537
4	Tinne Vilhelmson-Silfvén	Caprice	1522	4537
4	Ann Behrenfors	Leroy	1514	4537
4	Annica Westerberg	Taktik	1501	4537
4	Eva Karin Oscarsson-Göthberg	Little Claus	1460	4537
5	Denmark			4533
5	Anne van Olst	Chevalier	1542	4533
5	Anne Grethe Törnblad	Ravel	1540	4533
5	Lene Hoberg	Bayard	1451	4533
5	Bent Jensen	Ariston	1411	4533
6	Switzerland			4524
6	Otto Hofer	Renzo	1548	4524
6	Ruth Hunkeler	Afghadi	1498	4524
6	Doris Ramseier	Renatus	1478	4524
7	Great Britain			4522
7	Carl Hester	Giorgione	1523	4522
7	Emile Faurie	Virtu	1513	4522
7	Laura Fry	Quarryman	1486	4522
7	Carol Parsons	Vashkar	1468	4522
8	Italy			4491
8	Pia Laus	Adrett	1571	4491
8	Paolo Giani Margi	Destino di Acciarella	1481	4491
8	Daria Fantoni	Sunny Boy	1439	4491
8	Laura Conz Dall'Ora	Lahti	1419	4491
9	France			4463
9	Margit Otto-Crépin	Maritim	1521	4463
9	Catherine Durand	Orphée	1498	4463
9	Serge Cornut	Olifant Charrière	1444	4463
9	Dominique d'Esmé	Rapport II	1427	4463
10	Canada			4322
10	Christilot Hanson-Boylen	Biraldo	1543	4322
10	Cindy Neale-Ishoy	Dakar	1466	4322
10	Martina Pracht	Emirage	1313	4322
11	Unified Team			4203
11	Inna Zhurakovska	Podgon	1443	4203
11	Olga Klimko	Shipovnik	1420	4203
11	Irina Zuykova	Barin	1340	4203
