= Denmark at the 1992 Summer Olympics =

- IOC code: DEN
- NOC: Danish Olympic Committee

in Barcelona
- Competitors: 110 (77 men and 33 women) in 14 sports
- Flag bearer: Jørgen Bojsen-Møller
- Medals Ranked 30th: Gold 1 Silver 1 Bronze 4 Total 6

Summer Olympics appearances (overview)
- 1896; 1900; 1904; 1908; 1912; 1920; 1924; 1928; 1932; 1936; 1948; 1952; 1956; 1960; 1964; 1968; 1972; 1976; 1980; 1984; 1988; 1992; 1996; 2000; 2004; 2008; 2012; 2016; 2020; 2024; 2028

Other related appearances
- 1906 Intercalated Games

Denmark competed at the 1992 Summer Olympics in Barcelona, Spain. 110 competitors, 77 men and 33 women, took part in 67 events in 14 sports.

== Medalists ==
Medal	Name	Sport	Event	Date
Gold	Jesper Bank; Steen Secher; Jesper Seier	Sailing	Soling	4 August
Silver	Christian Frederiksen; Arne Nielsson	Canoeing	Men's C-2 1000 metres	8 August
Bronze	Ken Frost; Jimmi Madsen; Klaus Kynde Nielsen; Jan Petersen; Michael Sandstød	Cycling	Men's team pursuit	31 July
Bronze	Jens Bojsen-Møller; Jørgen Bojsen-Møller	Sailing	Flying Dutchman	3 August
Bronze	Thomas Stuer-Lauridsen	Badminton	Men's singles	3 August
Bronze	Brian Nielsen	Boxing	Super heavyweight	7 August

== Competitors ==
The following is the list of number of competitors in the Games.

Sport	Men	Women	Total
Archery	3	0	3
Athletics	0	3	3
Badminton	6	6	12
Boxing	4	–	4
Canoeing	4	2	6
Cycling	9	2	11
Equestrian	2	5	7
Football	16	–	16
Rowing	9	4	13
Sailing	12	4	16
Shooting	6	1	7
Swimming	2	6	8
Tennis	2	0	2
Weightlifting	2	–	2
Total	77	33	110

== Archery ==
Denmark had very little success in the 1992 archery competition, losing all three head-to-head matches.

Men

Athlete	Event	Ranking round		Round of 32	Round of 16	Quarterfinals	Semifinals	Final / BM	
Athlete	Event	Score	Seed	Opposition Score	Opposition Score	Opposition Score	Opposition Score	Opposition Score	Rank
Ole Gammelgaard Nielsen	Individual	1306	10 Q	Hallard (GBR); L 98–103	Did not advance				
Henrik Kromann Toft	Individual	1291	16 Q	Vermeiren (BEL); L 97–101	Did not advance				
Jan Rytter	Individual	1217	64	Did not advance					
Ole Gammelgaard Nielsen; Henrik Kromann Toft; Jan Rytter	Team	3817	7 Q	—N/a	Spain; L 230–233	Did not advance			

== Athletics ==
Women
Track and road events

Athlete	Event	Heats		Quarterfinal		Semifinal		Final	
Athlete	Event	Result	Rank	Result	Rank	Result	Rank	Result	Rank
Gitte Karlshøj	3000 metres	8:54.05	16	—N/a				Did not advance	
Dorthe Rasmussen	10,000 metres	33:22.43	28	—N/a				Did not advance	

Field events

Athlete	Event	Qualification		Final	
Athlete	Event	Distance	Position	Distance	Position
Renata Nielsen	Long jump	6.55	12 q	6.06	11

== Badminton ==
Men

Athlete	Event	Round of 64	Round of 32	Round of 16	Quarterfinals	Semifinals	Final	
Athlete	Event	Opposition Result	Opposition Result	Opposition Result	Opposition Result	Opposition Result	Opposition Result	Rank
Poul-Erik Høyer Larsen	Singles	Bye	Machida (JPN); W 15–2, 15–4	Chan (HKG); W 15–10, 15–5	Wiranata (INA); L 10–15, 12–15	Did not advance		
Thomas Stuer-Lauridsen	Singles	Kumar (IND); W 15–6, 15–6	Blanshard (CAN); W 15–7, 15–4	Liu (CHN); W 10–15, 17–16, 15–9	Sidek (MAS); W 15–12, 15–8	Budikusuma (INA); L 14–18, 8–15	Did not advance	3rd place, bronze medalist(s)
Jon Holst-Christensen; Thomas Lund	Doubles	—N/a	Galt / Harrison (NZL); W 15–0, 15–2	Sidek / Sidek (MAS); L 12–15, 6–15	Did not advance			
Henrik Svarrer; Jan Paulsen	Doubles	—N/a	Khan / Koh (SGP); W 15–1, 15–5	Humble / Kaul (CAN); W 15–5, 15–4	Li / Tian (CHN); L 11–15, 15–12, 14–17	Did not advance		

Women

Athlete	Event	Round of 64	Round of 32	Round of 16	Quarterfinals	Semifinals	Final	
Athlete	Event	Opposition Result	Opposition Result	Opposition Result	Opposition Result	Opposition Result	Opposition Result	Rank
Camilla Martin	Singles	Seesurun (MRI); W 11–1, 11–0	Lao (AUS); L 6–11, 11–12	Did not advance				
Pernille Nedergaard	Singles	Bye	Krasowska (POL); W 11–0, 11–3	Jaroensiri (THA); L 11–5, 6–11, 10–12	Did not advance			
Grete Mogensen; Pernille Dupont	Doubles	—N/a	Jinnai / Mori (JPN); L 14–18, 18–14, 2–10	Did not advance				
Lisbet Stuer-Lauridsen; Marlene Thomsen	Doubles	—N/a	Julien / Piché (CAN); W 9–15, 18–16, 18–14	Guan / Nong (CHN); L 3–15, 12–15	Did not advance			

== Boxing ==
Athlete	Event	Round of 32	Round of 16	Quarterfinals	Semifinals	Final	
Athlete	Event	Opposition Result	Opposition Result	Opposition Result	Opposition Result	Opposition Result	Rank
Jesper Jensen	Flyweight	Berhili (MAR); W 10–4	Kovács (HUN); L 0–14	Did not advance			
Brian Lentz	Middleweight	Altangerel (MGL); W 4–0	Ottke (GER); L 2–9	Did not advance			
Mark Hulstrøm	Heavyweight	Mavrović (CRO); L 2–8	Did not advance				
Brian Nielsen	Super heavyweight	Bye	Jeong (KOR); W 16–2	Hrivňák (TCH); W 14–4	Balado (CUB); L 1–15	Did not advance	3rd place, bronze medalist(s)

== Canoeing ==
=== Sprint ===
Men

Athlete	Event	Heats		Repechage		Semifinals		Final	
Athlete	Event	Time	Rank	Time	Rank	Time	Rank	Time	Rank
Arne Nielsson; Christian Frederiksen	C-2 500 metres	1:49.58	5 SF	—N/a		1:41.58	2 F	1:42.92	5
Arne Nielsson; Christian Frederiksen	C-2 1000 metres	3:32.32	2 F	—N/a		Bye		3:39.26	2nd place, silver medalist(s)
Thor Nielsen	K-1 1000 metres	3:39.86	1 SF	Bye		3:36.35	2 F	3:41.70	7
Jesper Staal; Thor Nielsen	K-2 500 metres	1:37.85	3 R	1:31.22	1 SF	1:30.02	3 F	1:31.84	6

Women

Athlete	Event	Heats		Semifinals		Final	
Athlete	Event	Time	Rank	Time	Rank	Time	Rank
Yvonne Knudsen	K-1 500 metres	2:01.09	6 SF	1:57.94	7	Did not advance	
Jeanette Knudsen; Yvonne Knudsen	K-2 500 metres	1:45.82	5 SF	1:43.58	5 F	1:43.98	8

== Cycling ==
Eleven cyclists, nine men and two women, represented Denmark in 1992.

=== Road ===
Men

Athlete	Event	Time	Rank
Christian Andersen	Road race	4:35:56	18
Lars Michaelsen	Road race	4:35:56	11
Claus Møller	Road race	4:35:56	34

Women

Athlete	Event	Time	Rank
Karina Skibby	Road race	2:05:03	11

=== Track ===
Pursuit

Athlete	Event	Qualification		Quarterfinals	Semifinals	Final	
Athlete	Event	Time	Rank	Opposition Time	Opposition Time	Opposition Time	Rank
Jan Bo Petersen	Men's individual pursuit	4:35.904	8 Q	Boardman (GBR); L Overtaken	Did not advance		10
Hanne Malmberg	Women's individual pursuit	3:45.230	5 Q	Samokhvalova (EUN); W 3:46.959	Roßner (GER); L 3:53.516	Did not advance	4
Ken Frost; Jimmi Madsen; Jan Bo Petersen; Klaus Kynde Nielsen; Michael Sandstød	Men's team pursuit	4:17.719	4 Q	Great Britain; W 4:12.270	Germany; L 4:15.860	Did not advance	3rd place, bronze medalist(s)

Points race

Athlete	Event	Qualification			Final		
Athlete	Event	Laps	Points	Rank	Laps	Points	Rank
Dan Frost	Points race	−1 lap	17	8 Q	0 laps	7	15

== Equestrianism ==
=== Dressage ===
Athlete	Horse	Event	Qualification		Final	
Athlete	Horse	Event	Score	Rank	Score	Rank
Lene Hoberg	Bayard	Individual	1451	36	Did not advance	
Bent Jensen	Ariston	Individual	1411	46	Did not advance	
Anne Grethe Törnblad	Ravel	Individual	1540	14 Q	1334	13
Anne van Olst	Chevalier	Individual	1542	13 Q	1358	10
Lene Hoberg; Bent Jensen; Anne Grethe Törnblad; Anne van Olst	See above	Team	—N/a		4533	5

=== Eventing ===
Athlete	Horse	Event	Dressage		Cross-country			Jumping			Total	
Athlete	Horse	Event	Penalties	Rank	Penalties	Total	Rank	Penalties	Total	Rank	Penalties	Rank
Nils Haagensen	Discovery	Individual	48.80	7	71.20	120.00	35	6.00	126.00	23	126.00	21

=== Jumping ===
Athlete	Horse	Event	Qualification								Final					
Athlete	Horse	Event	Round 1		Round 2		Round 3		Total		Round 1		Round 2		Total	
Athlete	Horse	Event	Score	Rank	Score	Rank	Score	Rank	Score	Rank	Penalties	Rank	Penalties	Rank	Penalties	Rank
Merethe Jensen	Maxime	Individual	60.00	28	81.00	7	74.50	13	215.50	2 Q	4.00	6 Q	8.75	9	12.75	8
Lone Kroman Petersen	Qludy	Individual	35.00	53	0.00	78	—N/a		35.00	78	Did not advance					

== Football ==
Summary

Key:

- W – Win L – Lose D – Draw
- A.E.T. – After extra time.
- P – Match decided by penalty-shootout.

Team	Event	Group stage				Quarterfinal	Semifinal	Final / BM	
Team	Event	Opposition Score	Opposition Score	Opposition Score	Rank	Opposition Score	Opposition Score	Opposition Score	Rank
Denmark men's	Men's tournament	Mexico; D 1–1	Ghana; D 0–0	Australia; L 0–3	4	Did not advance			

=== Men's tournament ===
Team roster

Head coach: Viggo Jensen

No.	Pos.	Player	DoB	Age	Caps	Club	Tournament games	Tournament goals	Minutes played	Sub off	Sub on	Cards yellow/red
1	GK	Niels Jørgensen	24 January 1971	21	16	(Denmark) Aalborg BK	3	0	270	-	-	-
2	DF	Thomas Helveg	24 June 1971	21	0	(Denmark) Odense BK	3	0	270	-	-	1/0
3	DF	Jacob Laursen	6 October 1971	20	10	(Denmark) VB	3	0	270	-	-	-
4	DF	Claus Thomsen	31 May 1970	22	15	(Denmark) AGF Aarhus	3	1	240	1	-	-
5	DF	Peter Frank	26 May 1970	22	14	(Denmark) BK Frem	2	0	158	-	1	-
6	MF	Jakob Kjeldbjerg	21 October 1969	22	17	(Denmark) Silkeborg	3	0	270	-	-	1/0
7	MF	Jens Christian Madsen	1 February 1970	22	18	(Denmark) Brøndby	1	0	30	-	1	-
8	MF	Ronnie Ekelund	21 August 1972	19	8	(Denmark) Brøndby	2	0	118	2	-	-
9	FW	Miklos Molnar	10 April 1970	22	18	(Switzerland) Servette	3	0	243	-	-	1/1
10	MF	Per Frandsen	6 February 1970	22	18	(France) Lille	3	0	270	-	-	1/0
11	FW	Peter Møller	23 March 1972	20	13	(Denmark) Aalborg BK	3	0	162	2	1	-
12	DF	Jens Risager	9 April 1971	21	2	(Denmark) Brøndby	-	-	-	-	-	-
13	MF	Stig Tøfting	14 August 1969	22	2	(Denmark) AGF Aarhus	3	0	270	-	-	1/0
14	MF	Lars Højer	8 December 1970	21	5	(Denmark) Copenhagen	3	0	214	-	1	-
15	MF	Michael Hansen	22 September 1971	20	13	(Denmark) Silkeborg	-	-	-	-	-	-
16	GK	Brian Flies	29 August 1969	22	0	(Denmark) Næstved BK	-	-	-	-	-	-
17	FW	Jens Christian Mosegaard Madsen	20 April 1970	21	11	(Denmark) Odense BK	1	0	19	-	1	-
18	MF	Michael Larsen	16 October 1969	22	5	(Denmark) Silkeborg	2	0	112	1	-	-
19	FW	Søren Andersen	31 January 1970	22	6	(Denmark) AGF Aarhus	1	0	27	-	1	-
20	MF	Michael Johansen	22 July 1972	20	3	(Denmark) Copenhagen	-	-	-	-	-	-

Group play

Team	Pld	W	D	L	GF	GA	GD	Pts
Ghana	3	1	2	0	4	2	+2	4
Australia	3	1	1	1	5	4	+1	3
Mexico	3	0	3	0	3	3	0	3
Denmark	3	0	2	1	1	4	−3	2

Source: FIFA
26 July 1992
19:00

Denmark	1–1	Mexico
Thomsen 85'	Report	Rotllán 39' (pen.)

Estadio La Romareda, Zaragoza
Attendance: 8,000
Referee: Fabio Baldas (Italy)

28 July 1992
19:00

Denmark	0–0	Ghana
	Report

Estadio La Romareda, Zaragoza
Attendance: 5,000
Referee: Juan Francisco Escobar (Paraguay)

30 July 1992
19:00

Denmark	0–3	Australia
	Report	Markovski 32'; Mori 60'; Vidmar 75'

Estadio La Romareda, Zaragoza
Attendance: 3,000
Referee: Fabio Baldas (Italy)

= !colspan="2"|Semifinals !colspan="2"|Final |-style="font-size:95%" !Time !Rank !Time !Rank !Time !Rank !Time !Rank |-align=center |align=dakwdpoawk |4 FB |5:41.61 |7 |}

Women

Athlete	Event	Heats		Repechage		Semifinals		Final	
Athlete	Event	Time	Rank	Time	Rank	Time	Rank	Time	Rank
Berit Christoffersen; Lene Pedersen; Trine Hansen; Ulla Werner Hansen	Quadruple sculls	7:03.34	4 R	6:48.76	3 FB	—N/a		6:51.89	8

== Sailing ==
Men

Athlete	Event	Race										Net points	Final rank
Athlete	Event	1	2	3	4	5	6	7	8	9	10	Net points	Final rank
Morten Egeblad Christoffersen	Men's Lechner A-390	16	12	11	17	21	17	~~PMS~~	7	5	25	184.0	17
Stig Westergaard	Finn	13	10	24~~RET~~	9	15	15	3	—N/a			97.7	12
Hans Jørgen Riber; Jesper Pilegaard	Men's 470	~~26~~	25	23	23	10	18	5	—N/a			139.0	19

Women

Athlete	Event	Race							Net points	Final rank
Athlete	Event	1	2	3	4	5	6	7	Net points	Final rank
Dorte Jensen	Europe	10	1	5	5	12	~~14~~	6	65.7	5
Susanne Ward; Marianne Halfdan-Nielsen	Women's 470	6	12	14	11	6	~~17~~	14	98.4	13

Open

Athlete	Event	Race							Net points	Final rank
Athlete	Event	1	2	3	4	5	6	7	Net points	Final rank
Jørgen Bojsen-Møller; Jens Bojsen-Møller	Flying Dutchman	~~11~~	3	10	5	1	2	2	37.7	Bronze medal
Lars Hendriksen; Anette Ree Andersen	Tornado	2	15	17	14	11	17	~~18~~	107.0	16
Benny F. Andersen; Mogens Just Mikkelsen	Star	~~21~~	6	19	4	1	19	10	85.7	9

Match racing

Athlete	Event	Qualification races						Total	Rank	Round Robin					Rank	Semifinals	Final / BM	Rank
Athlete	Event	1	2	3	4	5	6	Total	Rank	USA	GER	GBR	SWE	ESP	Rank	Semifinals	Final / BM	Rank
Jesper Bank; Jesper Seier; Steen Secher	Soling	2	2	1	8	8	~~RET~~	34.0	2 Q	L	W	W	L	W	2 Q	GER W 2–0	USA W 2–0	Gold medal

== Shooting ==
Men

Athlete	Event	Qualification		Final	
Athlete	Event	Points	Rank	Points	Rank
Klavs Jørn Christensen	50 metre rifle three positions	1153	25	Did not advance	
Jørgen Herlufsen	50 metre rifle three positions	1141	37	Did not advance	
Bo Lilja	50 metre rifle prone	591	31	Did not advance	
Jens Harskov Loczi	50 metre rifle prone	596	11	Did not advance	

Women

Athlete	Event	Qualification		Final	
Athlete	Event	Points	Rank	Points	Rank
Karen Hansen	10 metre air pistol	378	12	Did not advance	

Open

Athlete	Event	Qualification		Final	
Athlete	Event	Points	Rank	Points	Rank
Ole Justesen	Skeet	196	16	Did not advance	
Ole Riber Rasmussen	Skeet	139	55	Did not advance	

== Swimming ==
Men

Athlete	Event	Heats		Final A/B	
Athlete	Event	Time	Rank	Time	Rank
Franz Mortensen	50 metre freestyle	23.61	29	Did not advance	
Franz Mortensen	100 metre freestyle	51.29	26	Did not advance	
Franz Mortensen	200 metre freestyle	1:53.86	32	Did not advance	
Lars Sørensen	200 metre backstroke	2:06.80	36	Did not advance	
Lars Sørensen	100 metre breaststroke	1:07.94	48	Did not advance	
Lars Sørensen	200 metre individual medley	2:04.65	15 FB	2:03.81	11

Women

Athlete	Event	Heats		Final A/B	
Athlete	Event	Time	Rank	Time	Rank
Mette Jacobsen	200 metre freestyle	2:01.84	13 FB	2:02.14	13
Mette Jacobsen	400 metre freestyle	4:16.80	13 FB	Withdrew	
Mette Jacobsen	200 metre butterfly	2:13.18	8 FA	2:11.87	7
Gitta Jensen	50 metre freestyle	26.54	18	Did not advance	
Gitta Jensen	100 metre freestyle	56.47	12 FB	56.59	12
Gitta Jensen	200 metre freestyle	2:02.27	14 FB	2:02.32	14
Mette Nielsen	50 metre freestyle	26.80	25	Did not advance	
Mette Nielsen	100 metre freestyle	58.67	27	Did not advance	
Annette Poulsen	200 metre individual medley	2:25.67	35	Did not advance	
Berit Puggaard	100 metre butterfly	1:04.57	38	Did not advance	
Berit Puggaard	200 metre butterfly	2:16.11	16 FB	2:15.07	15
Britta Vestergaard	100 metre breaststroke	1:13.58	27	Did not advance	
Britta Vestergaard	200 metre breaststroke	2:35.28	21	Did not advance	
Britta Vestergaard	400 metre individual medley	DQ		Did not advance	
Gitta Jensen; Mette Jacobsen; Berit Puggaard; Mette Nielsen; Annette Poulsen (heats)	4 × 100 metre freestyle relay	3:48.78	7 FA	3:47.81	6
Mette Jacobsen; Britta Vestergaard; Berit Puggaard; Gitta Jensen	4 × 100 metre medley relay	4:17.20	11	Did not advance	

== Tennis ==
Men

Athlete	Event	Round of 64	Round of 32	Round of 16	Quarterfinals	Semifinals	Final	
Athlete	Event	Opposition Result	Opposition Result	Opposition Result	Opposition Result	Opposition Result	Opposition Result	Rank
Kenneth Carlsen	Singles	Prpić (CRO); L 4–6, 6–4, 3–6, 5–7	Did not advance					
Kenneth Carlsen; Frederik Fetterlein	Doubles	—N/a	Gyetko / Leblanc (CAN); L 3–6, 6–7, 6–7	Did not advance				

== Weightlifting ==
Athlete	Event	Snatch		Clean & jerk		Total	Rank
Athlete	Event	Result	Rank	Result	Rank	Total	Rank
Henrik Andersen	75 kg	130.0	27	167.5	26	297.5	27
Kim Lynge Pedersen	100 kg	150.0	19	185.0	18	335.0	19
