= Sistema Bibliotecario Consortile Antonio Panizzi =

The Sistema Bibliotecario Consortile Antonio Panizzi is a public library system in the Province of Varese, Italy. The system headquarters are in Gallarate. It is named after Sir Anthony Panizzi.

== Branches ==
The system has libraries in:

- Albizzate
- Arsago Seprio
- Besnate
- Cairate
- Cardano al Campo
- Carnago
- Casorate Sempione
- Cassano Magnago
- Cavaria con Premezzo
- Ferno
- Gallarate
- Jerago con Orago
- Lonate Pozzolo
- Oggiona con Santo Stefano
- Samarate
- Solbiate Arno
