= Pracht (surname) =

Pracht is surname of:

- Charles Frederick Pracht (1880 – 1950), a Republican member of the U.S. House of Representatives
- Eva Maria Pracht (1937–2021), a German-Canadian Olympic equestrian
- Martina Pracht (b. 1964), a German-Canadian equestrian
- Robert Pracht (1878–1961), a German composer and music educator

== See also ==
- Pracht, a municipality in the district of Altenkirchen, Rhineland-Palatinate, western Germany
