= Glamourdale =

Dressage stallion (born 2011)

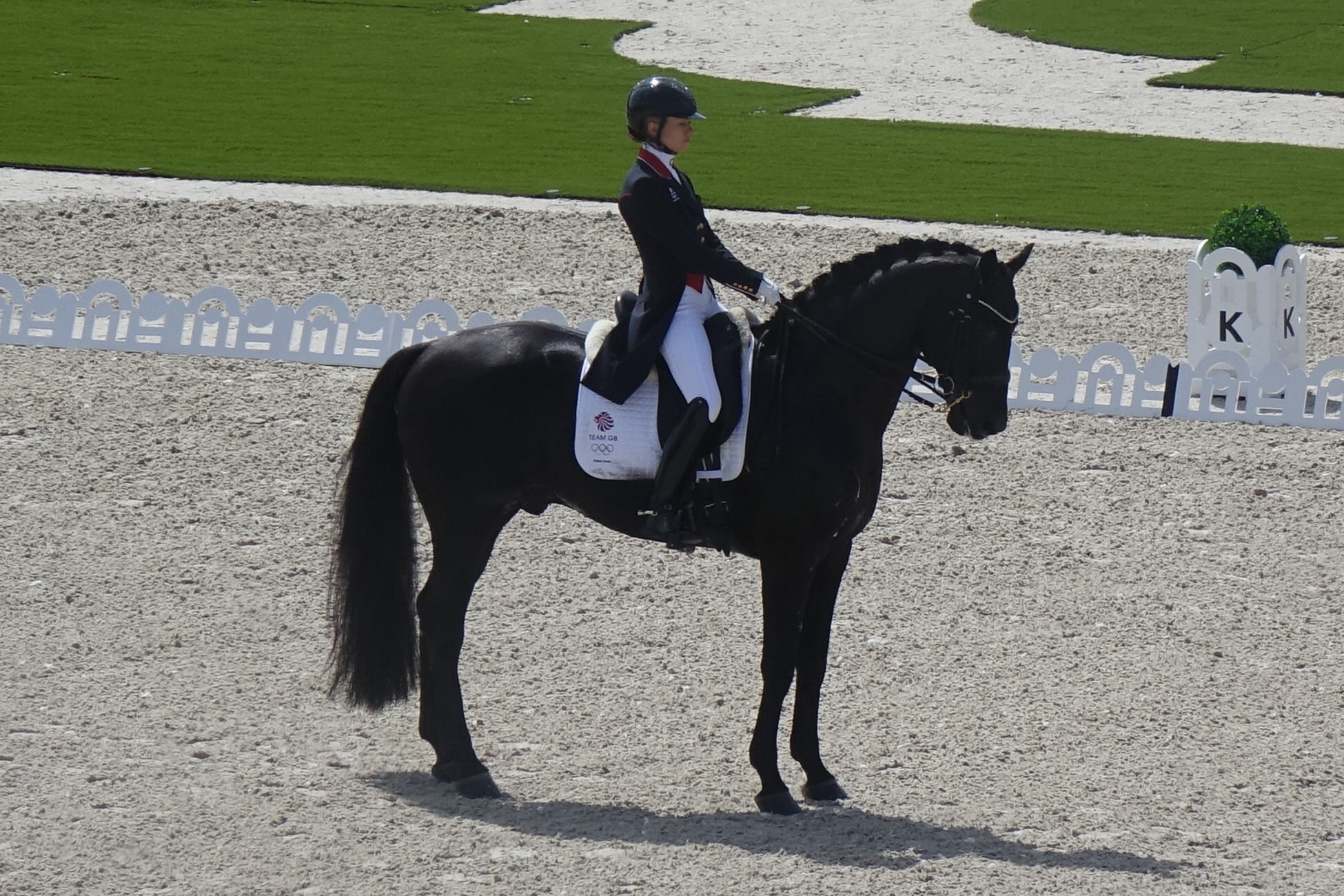
- Breed: Dutch Warmblood
- Sire: Lord Leatherdale
- Grandsire: Lord Loxley I
- Dam: Thuja
- Maternal grandsire: Negro
- Sex: Stallion
- Foaled: 2011
- Country: Netherlands
- Breeder: J.W. Rodenburg
- Owner: Anne van Olst Gert-Jan van Olst
- Trainer: Anne van Olst
- Rider: Charlotte Fry

Major wins
- Individual Gold Grand Prix Special World FEI World Championships Herning 2022; Individual Gold Grand Prix Freestyle FEI World Championships Herning 2022; Team Silver FEI World Championships Herning 2022; 2018 FEI World Champion 7-year-old dressage horses

Awards
- KWPN Horse Of The Year 2020

Glamourdale (born 2011) is a stallion ridden by the Dutch-Based, British equestrian Charlotte Fry in the sport of dressage. He is the 2022 world champion in the Grand Prix Special and Grand Prix Freestyle.

== Breeding ==
Glamourdale was bred by J.W. Rodenburg, a Dutch Breeder located in Ouderkerk aan den IJssel. His sire is the Rheinländer stallion Lord Leatherdale, by Lord Loxley. His dam, KWPN preferent prok mare Thuja, was sired by Negro and is thus a half sister to Olympic, World, and European Champion, as well as current record holder in all three dressage tests, Valegro. He is currently owned by his sire's owners, Danish Olympian Anne van Olst and Gert-Jan van Olst.

== Career ==
Glamourdale is ridden by British Rider Charlotte Fry in competition. He won the 7-year olds final at 2018 World Young Horse Championships in Ermelo, having finished 10th in the 5-year old class two years prior.

In August 2022, at the 2022 FEI World Championships in Herning, again partnered with Fry, he won both the Grand Prix Special and Grand Prix Freestyle, breaking the 90% barrier in the latter, as well as securing Silver in the team competition.

Glamourdale and Fry won the Dressage World Cup freestyle competition at the London International Horse Show in 2022 and again in 2024.

At the Paris 2024 Olympics, the pair won bronze in both the individual dressage and team dressage events.

== Breeding career ==
Glamourdale is also an active breeding stallion and has won several awards in this regard, such as winning top stallion at the 2014 Stallion Inspection and the Reserve Champion of the 2014 KWPN performance test.
