= Casorate =

Casorate may refer to:

- Casorate Primo, a comune (municipality) in the Province of Pavia in the Italian region of Lombardy, located about 20 km southwest of Milan and about 20 km northwest of Pavia.
- Casorate Sempione, a comune (municipality) in the Province of Varese in the Italian region of Lombardy, located about 40 km northwest of Milan and about 20 km southwest of Varese.
