= Cavaria con Premezzo =

- Comune
- Comune di Cavaria con Premezzo
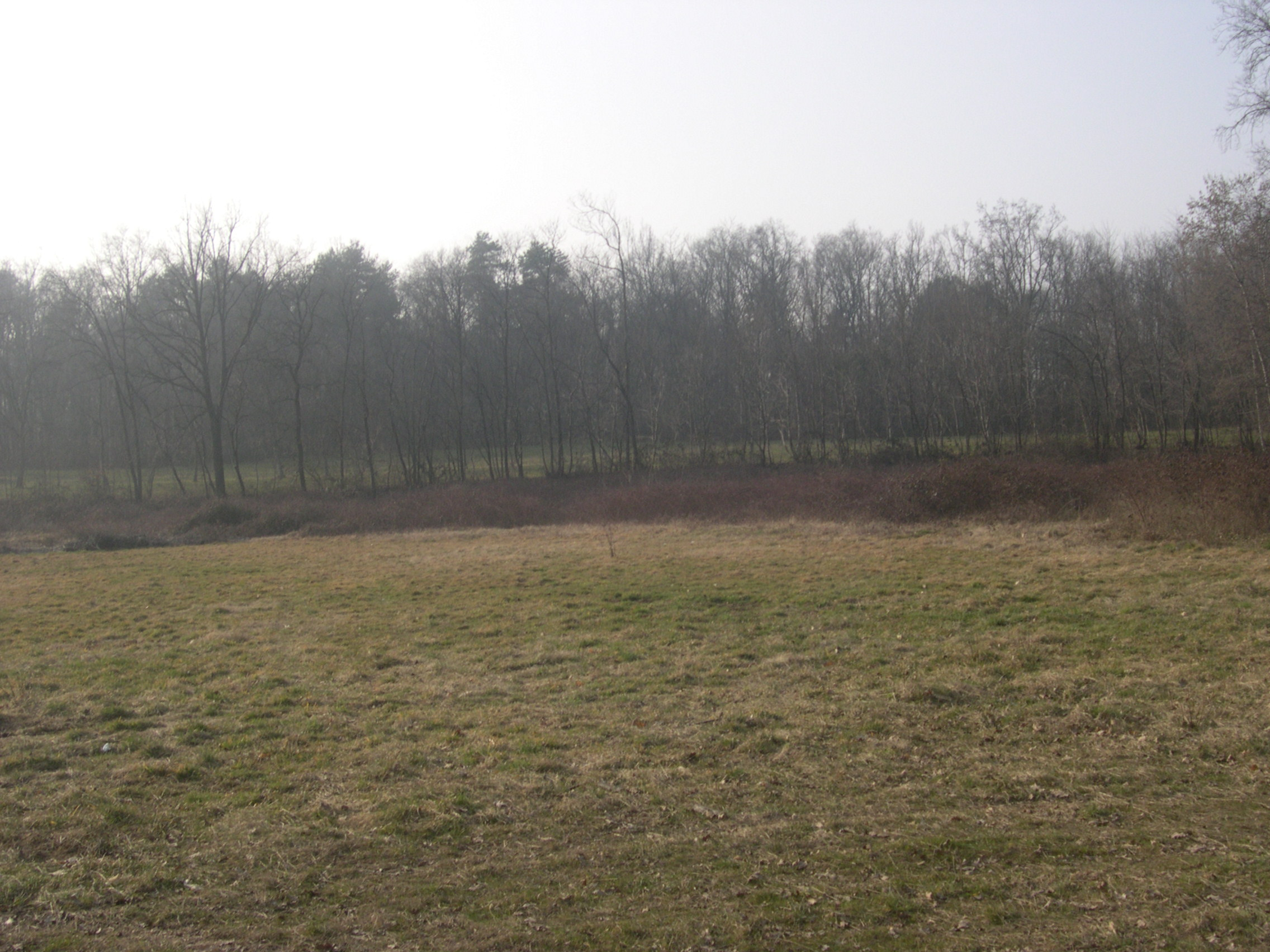

- Location within Italy Location within Lombardy
- Coordinates: 45°42′N 8°48′E
- Country: Italy
- Region: Lombardy
- Province: Varese (VA)

Government
  - Mayor: Alberto Tovaglieri

Area
  - Total: 3.2 km^{2} (1.2 sq mi)
- Elevation: 268 m (879 ft)

Population (28 February 2017)
  - Total: 5,814
  - Density: 1,800/km^{2} (4,700/sq mi)
- Demonym(s): Cavariesi and Premezzesi
- Time zone: UTC+1 (CET)
  - Summer (DST): UTC+2 (CEST)
- Postal code: 21044
- Dialing code: 0331

Cavaria con Premezzo is a comune (municipality) in the Province of Varese in the Italian region Lombardy, located about 40 kilometres (25 mi) northwest of Milan and about 13 kilometres (8 mi) south of Varese.

Cavaria con Premezzo borders the following municipalities: Besnate, Cassano Magnago, Gallarate, Jerago con Orago, Oggiona con Santo Stefano.

It is served by Cavaria-Oggiona-Jerago railway station.
