= Augusto Garau =

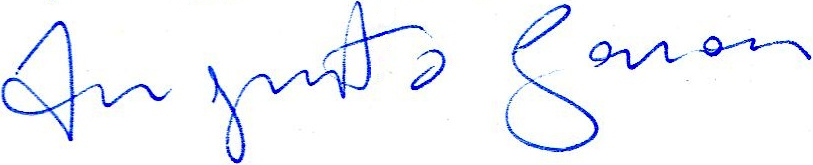
Signature of Augusto Garau, 1987

Augusto Orazio Vittorio Garau (1923 in Bolzano – 2010 in Milan) was an Italian artist, theorist of color, and professor. Garau took part in the Concrete art Movement (MAC).
Official website managed by the heirs https://www.augustogarau.it

== Education and early years ==
Garau graduated at the Brera Academy in Milan in 1946. Three years earlier, he had met his mentor Atanasio Soldati in Voghera. Soldati, who was one of the first Italian abstractionists, was in Voghera as a consequence of his retreat from Milan during the bombing of World War II. Soldati and Garau co-founded the Concrete Art Movement in 1948, a groundbreaking artistic movement that championed pure geometric abstract forms. In addition to Soldati and Garau, Piero Dorazio, Gillo Dorfles, Lucio Fontana, Giovanni Guerrini, Galliano_Mazzon, Gianni Monnet, Bruno Munari, Achille Perilli, Ettore Sottsass, and Luigi Veronesi also took part in the movement's initiatives. Against this background, Garau embraced the style and language of abstractionism. However, after the death of Soldati (1953), he left the group and temporarily abstraction. He helped the widow of Soldati, Maria, by running Soldati's estate and organizing exhibitions of his work. Additionally, he became the official authenticator of Soldati's work. Until the mid-to-late 1960s, Garau kept on experimenting across different subjects, styles and techniques, including figurative representations, visual poetry and pottery.

== Abstraction, psychology of perception, and theory of color ==
In the wake of the social, political, and aesthetic upheaval of the late 1960s, Garau's distinctive style clearly emerged. He recovered the lesson of the abstractionism and combined it with his growing interest in the psychology of visual perception that he assimilated through the Gestalt theory. In particular, the intense intellectual exchanges with German perceptual psychologist Rudolph Arnheim and Italian scholar and artist Gaetano Kanizsa (founder of the Institute of Psychology at the University of Trieste) were crucial for his artistic and cultural evolution. In this period, indeed, Garau began painting "cropped fonts," "anomalous surfaces," ambiguous spaces, and modular geometric forms that represented both scientific investigations in perception and expression of a truly original aesthetic. In the following years, Garau's constant research came to embrace the structural analysis of color. A number of patinings such as the series of the "spires," as well as a 1984 essay, titled Color Harmonies and published with an Arnheim's preface, reflect Garau's keen interest in chromatism, transparencies, and juxtapositions.

== Exhibitions and teaching ==
Augusto Garau's artworks have been exhibited at Galleria Borromini (Milan, 1948), Galleria Bergamini (Milano, 1952), St. Martin's Gallery (London, 1964), Palazzo Venezia (Rome, 1983), Civica Galleria d'Arte Moderna (Gallarate, 1983, 1984, and 1997), Galleria Vinciana, (Milan, 1988), and the Venice Biennale Internazionale d’Arte (1986). The most recent exhibitions were in Pavia, (Broletto Palace, 2014). Some of his works were featured in the group exhibitions Painting in Italy 1910s-1950s: Futurism, Abstraction, Concrete Art at the Sperone Westwater Gallery in New York City. and Oltrepò Pavese, Crossroads Of Abstractionism, at Border Line Art Gallery in Voghera (2015), a group exhibition with Atanasio Soldati and Giovanni Novaresio.

Garau has taught at the Politecnic School of Design in Milan and at the Department of Architecture of the University of Milan.

== Bibliography ==
- Giorgio Di Genova, Augusto Garau. Artista politecnico e scienziato: opere 1940-2008, Bologna: Bora, 2008
- Marco Meneguzzo, Augusto Garau. Ambigue trasparenze, Milan: Silvana, 2014
- Luciano Caramel, Movimento Arte Concreta 1948-1958, Modena: Fonte D'Abisso, 1987
- Luciano Caramel, ed., Paintings by Augusto Garau: St. Martin's Gallery, 24th February-7th March 1964, London: St. Martin's Gallery, 1964
