= Basilica of Santa Maria Assunta, Gallarate =

Catholic Basilica in Gallarate, Italy

Coordinates: 45.6598°N 8.7936°E

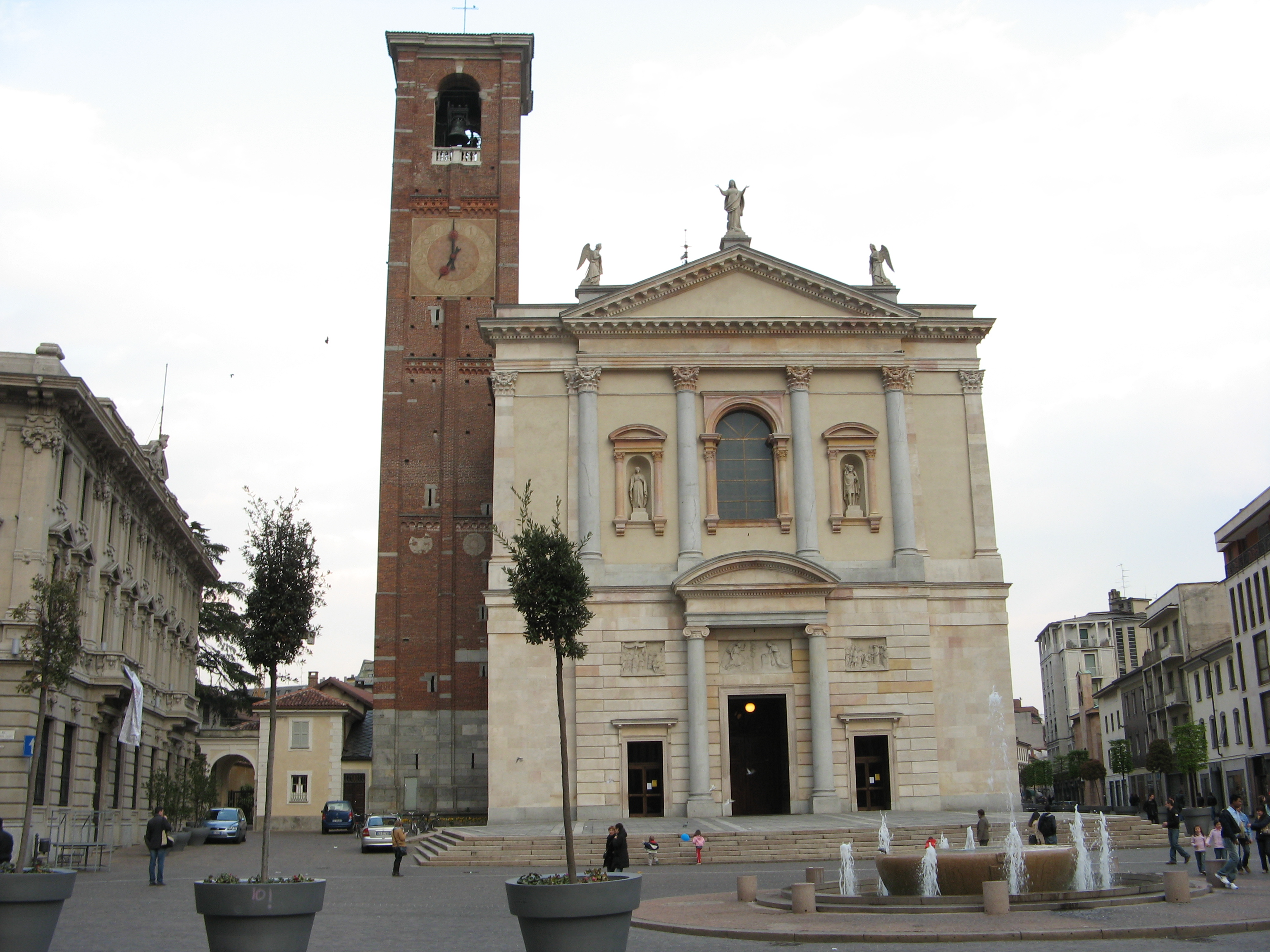
The Basilica

The Basilica of Santa Maria Assunta is a Roman Catholic Basilica located in Gallarate, Lombardy, Italy. It was elevated to the status of Basilica by Pope Pius XII in April 1946.

== History ==

The basilica was built on the site of two ancient churches, both dedicated to Santa Maria. One is mentioned in a document dating from 974. The second was built between the 14th and 15th centuries.

The present-day basilica was constructed between 1856 and 1861, with its façade completed in 1870. The church has a single nave measuring 89 metres in length and 17 metres in width. Its dome is 18 metres in diameter and 27 metres high.

The interior

The basilica houses several frescoes by Luigi Cavenaghi and stucco decorations by Celso Stecchetti. Notable sculptures include the Assumption of Mary by Giuseppe Rosnati, the sculpture above the high altar by Odoardo Tabacchi, and Saint John the Baptist by Duprè.

The organ was built in 1987 by the Mascioni company of Cuvio, in the province of Varese.

The bell tower, which stands 45 metres high, dates from 1454 and is therefore contemporary with the second Basilica of Santa Maria Assunta.

Two commemorative plaques inside the basilica recall some of the families who were members of its building administration (Fabbriceria), including the Rosnati, Maino, Sartorio, the noble Forni family, the Bonicalzi family and others.

In 2015, an extensive restoration project began inside the building. This also included the construction of a new altar, replacing the temporary arrangement introduced immediately after the Second Vatican Council.

The bell tower and façade were restored during the 1980s and 2000s respectively.
