= Yoshinaga Sakurai =

Japanese equestrian

Personal information
- Nationality: Japanese
- Born: 6 November 1949 (age 75)

Sport
- Sport: Equestrian

Yoshinaga Sakurai (born 6 November 1949) is a Japanese equestrian. He competed in the individual dressage event at the 1992 Summer Olympics.
