= Museo MAGA =

Art museum in Gallarate, Varese, Italy

MAGA – Museo Arte Gallarate
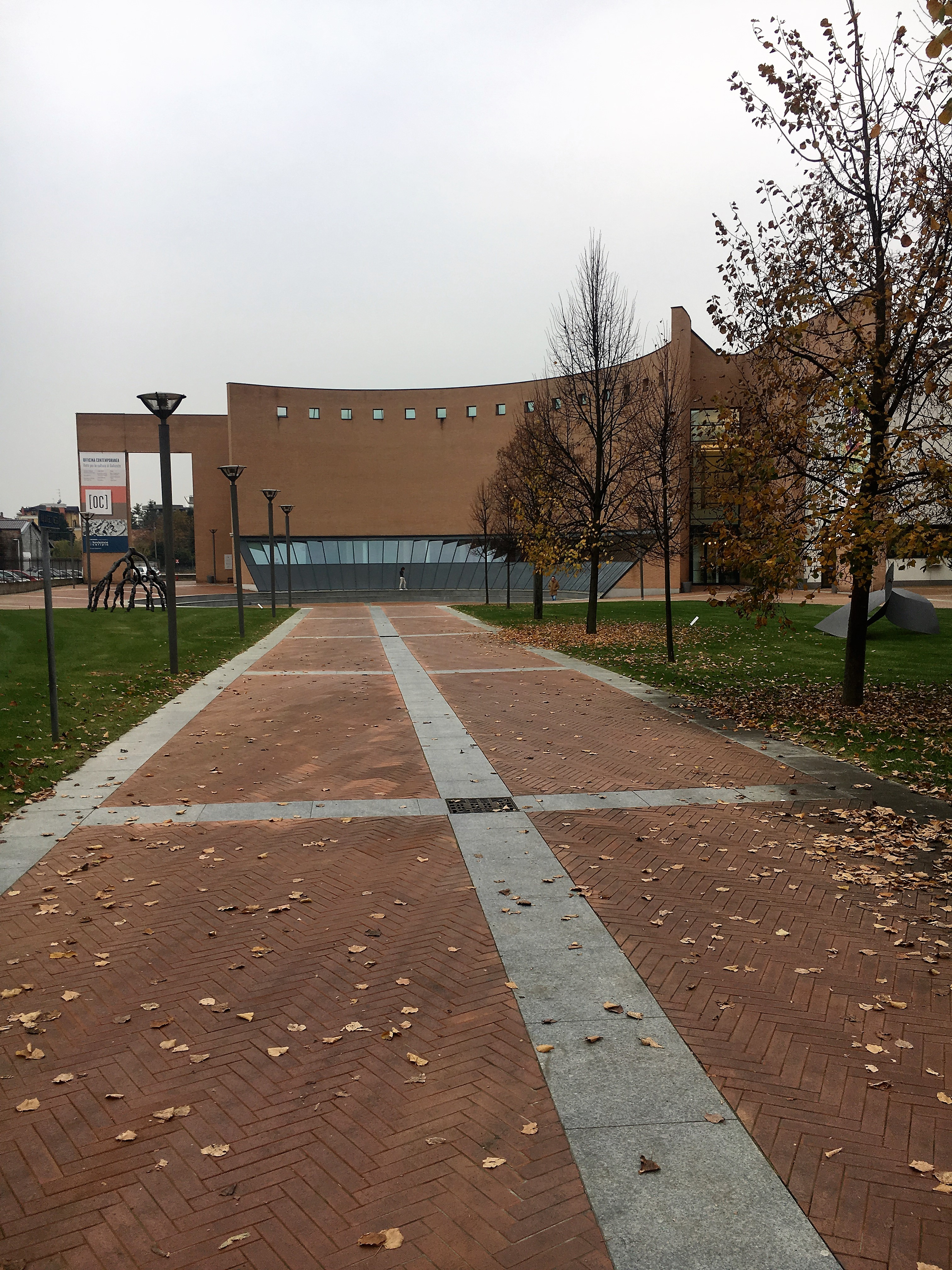

- Location of MAGA in Lombardy Museo MAGA (Italy)
- Former name: Civica Galleria D'Arte Moderna di Gallarate
- Established: 1966
- Location: Gallarate, Lombardy, Italy
- Coordinates: 45.6542°N 8.7980°E
- Collection size: over 5000 works
- Founder: Silvio Zanella
- Website: museomaga.it/en

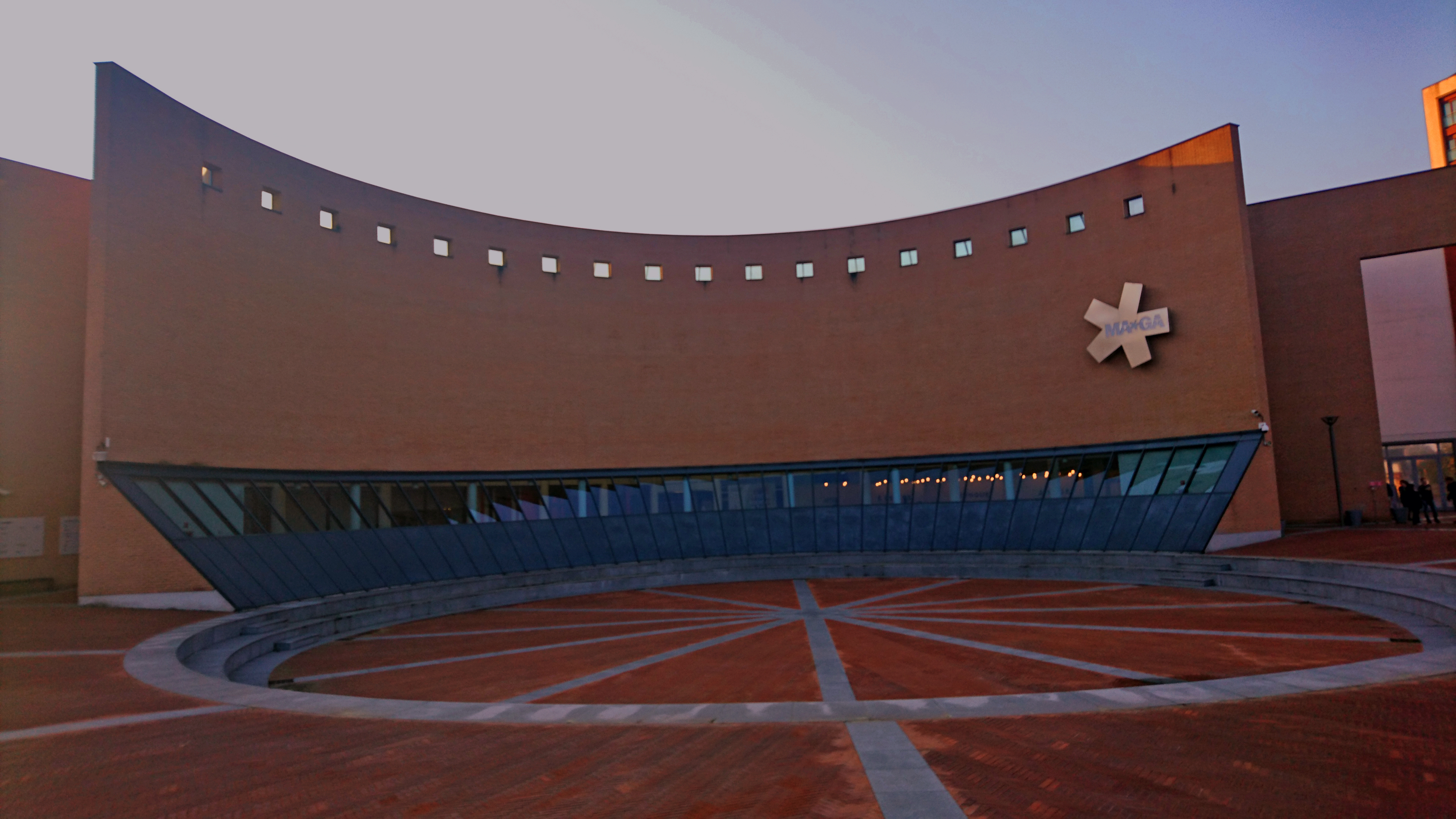
MAGA Museum of Gallarate, Nov 2016

The Museo Arte Gallarate or MAGA is a museum of modern and contemporary art in Gallarate, in the province of Varese in Lombardy, in northern Italy. It was founded in 1966 as the Civica Galleria d'Arte Moderna di Gallarate to house works purchased from, and donated by, artists participating in the Premio Gallarate, a national art competition. It was renamed in 2010 and moved to a new building. The museum holds over 5000 works, and the collection includes paintings, drawings, sculptures, graphic design works, photographs, and installations by artists including Carlo Carrà, Loris Cecchini, Gianni Colombo, Lucio Fontana, Ennio Morlotti, Bruno Munari and Studio Azzurro. Between 2015 and 2017 Museo MAGA had a second venue in the Palazzo Leone Da Perego, in Legnano, some 15 km to the south-east of Gallarate.

== History ==
The Civica Galleria d'Arte Moderna di Gallarate was founded in 1966 to house works acquired – either by donation or by purchase – from the first eight editions of the Premio Gallarate (in full, the Premio Nazionale Arti Visive Città di Gallarate), which had been founded sixteen years earlier, in 1950. The GAM became a nationally recognized museum at the beginning of the 1980s.

On 19 March 2010, the grand opening of the current Museo MAGA began with an exhibition dedicated to Amedeo Modigliani. The newly relocated museum was given the name Museo MAGA upon moving to its newly constructed premises. The modern makeover was completed to create a relationship with younger visitors and a more contemporary approach to the appreciation of the arts. Between 2015 and 2017, the Museo MAGA expanded into Palazzo Leone da Perego in the center of Legnano, Lombardy, Italy.

== Palazzo Leone Da Perego ==
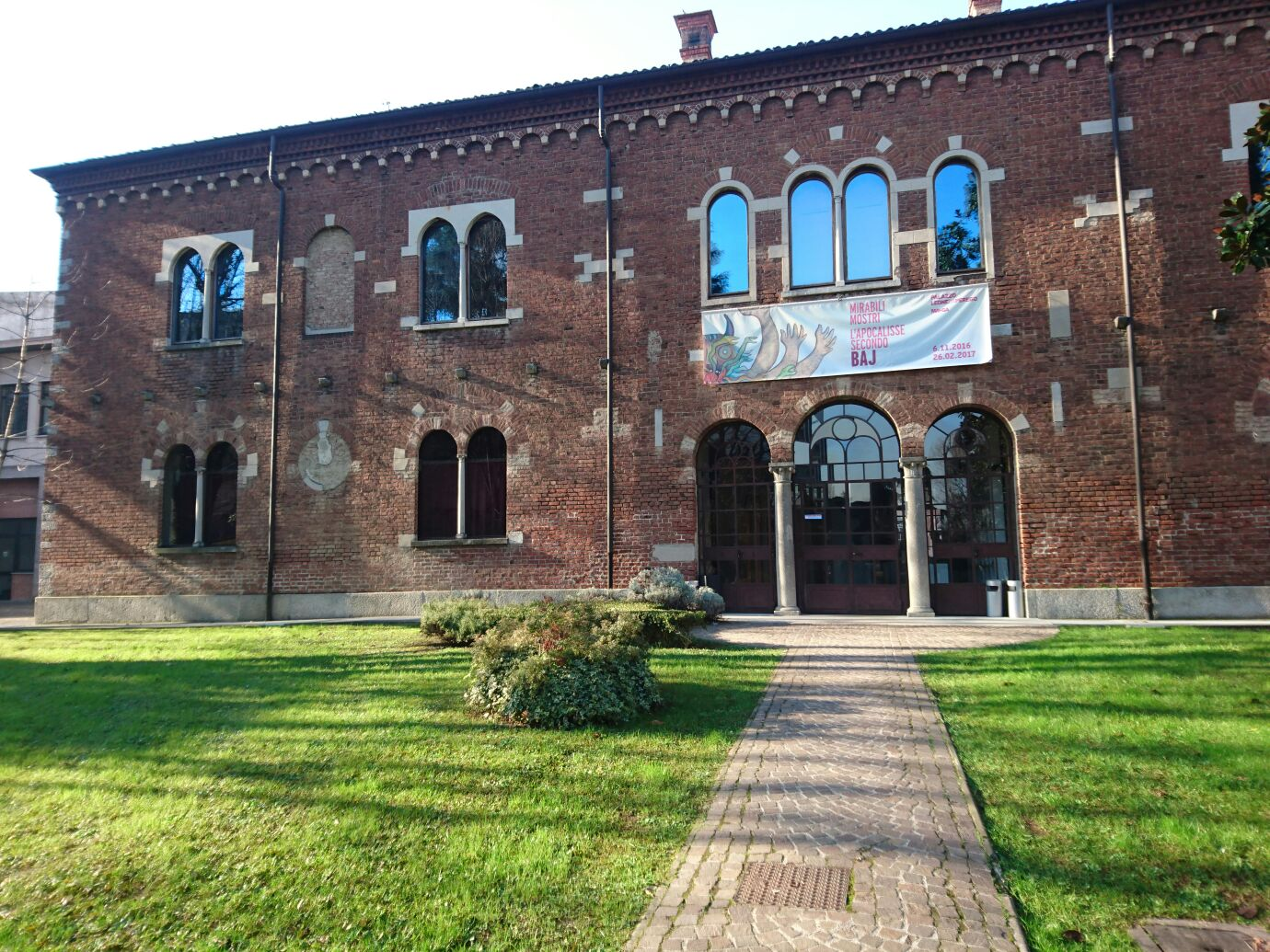
The main entrance to the Palazzo Leone da Perego

This structure was built in the second half of the thirteenth century by an Archiepiscopal Court. Two important buildings were built on the ruins of the castle of Cotta by the Archbishops of Milan: The Palazzo Leone da Perego and The Palace of Ottone Visconti. The Archbishop's residences surrounded both buildings. In 2016, little remains of the original building due to radical restorations since 1898.

The European Photograph Festival was held in the building in 2016, with work by Michael Akerman, Raffaele Montepaone, Giovanni Sesia, Giovanni Mereghetti and Cecile Decorniquet, among others.

=== CAM (Concrete Art Movement) ===
This project is dedicated to "The harmony of the form, Angelo Bozzola and the Concrete Art Movement (1948–1958)". The exhibition is dedicated to the CAM because the MAGA museum has the historic archive and the important collection that belongs to the Foundation of Angelo Bozzola of Galliate. In the Palazzo Leone da Perego there are more than 75 art works by the artist Angelo Bozzola, and additional works by Bruno Munari, Gianni Monnet, Gillo Dorfles, Atanasio Soldati, and Augusto Garau.
