= Charlotte Fry =

British equestrian

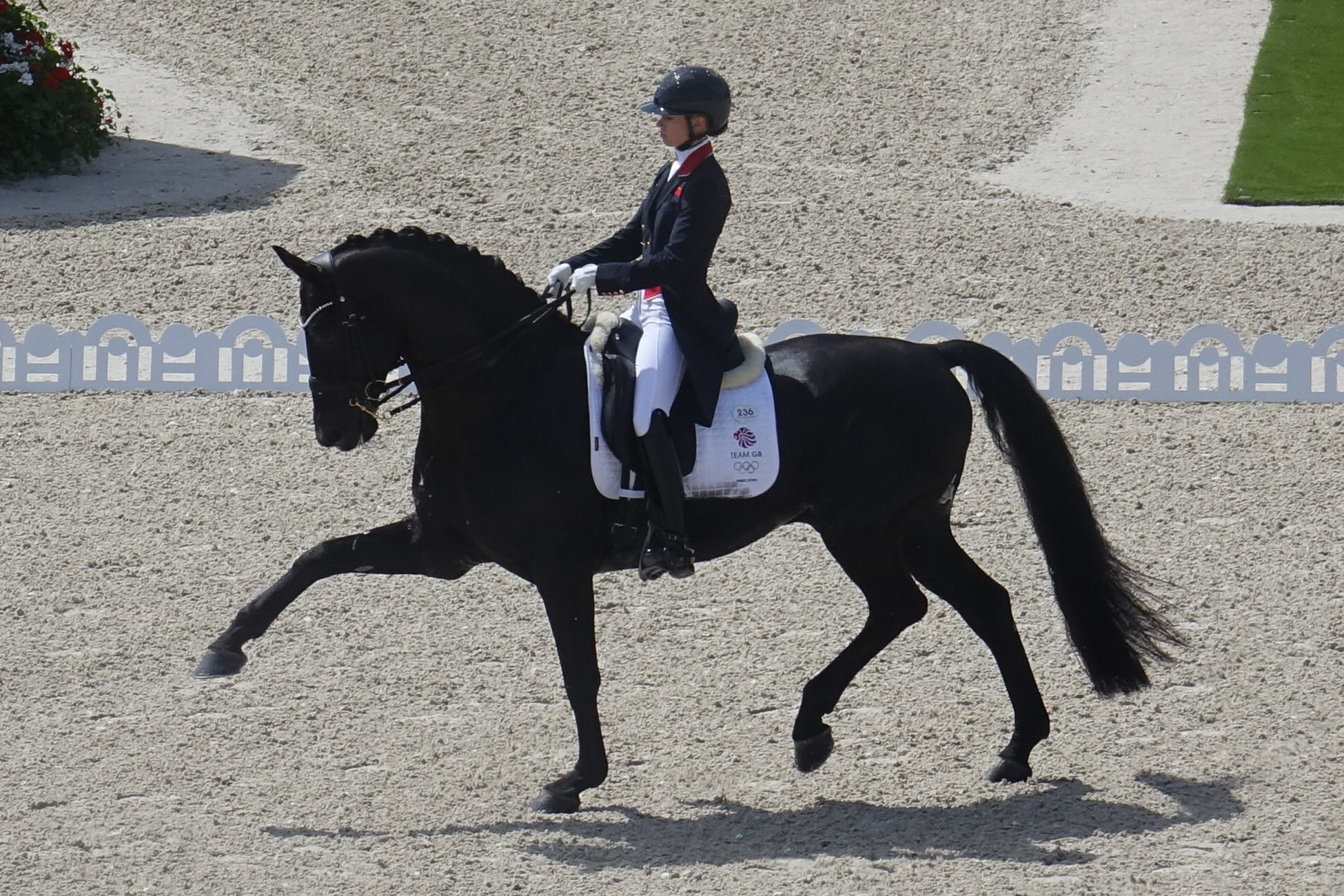
- Fry and Glamourdale at the 2024 summer Olympics.

Personal information
- Nickname: Lottie
- Born: 11 February 1996 (age 30) Scarborough, England

Sport
- Country: Great Britain
- Sport: Equestrian
- Event: Dressage
- Coached by: Anne van Olst

Achievements and titles
- Olympic finals: Tokyo 2020; Paris 2024
Medal record
Equestrian
Representing Great Britain
Olympic Games
Bronze medal – third place	2020 Tokyo	Team dressage
Bronze medal – third place	2024 Paris	Team dressage
Bronze medal – third place	2024 Paris	Individual dressage
World Championships
Gold medal – first place	2022 Herning	Individual special dressage
Gold medal – first place	2022 Herning	Individual freestyle dressage
Gold medal – first place	2026 Aachen	Individual special dressage
Gold medal – first place	2026 Aachen	Individual freestyle dressage
Silver medal – second place	2022 Herning	Team dressage
Silver medal – second place	2026 Aachen	Team dressage
European Championships
Gold medal – first place	2023 Riesenbeck	Team dressage
Silver medal – second place	2021 Hagen	Team dressage
Silver medal – second place	2023 Riesenbeck	Individual dressage
Dressage World Cup
Gold medal – first place	2025 Basel	Individual dressage
World Championships for Young Dressage Horses
Gold medal – first place	2018 Ermelo	Individual dressage
Gold medal – first place	2021 Verden	Individual dressage
U25 European Dressage Championships
Gold medal – first place	2018 Exloo	Individual dressage

Charlotte Fry (born 11 February 1996) is an Olympic, European Championships and World Championships medal-winning British dressage rider. As of August 2024, Fry has a total of 90 victories and is currently third in the FEI World Dressage Ranking.

== Early life ==
Born in Scarborough, England to Laura Fry, who competed at the 1992 Summer Olympic Games in Barcelona, Fry started riding at a young age. At age 14, she started training with Olympic Champion Carl Hester, eventually working for him part-time in exchange for lessons. Hester told former Danish Olympian Anne van Olst about Fry, after which Charlotte moved to the Netherlands to train with van Olst. Since 2014, she has lived and worked in Den Hout, Netherlands, though she still represents Great Britain in competitions.

== Career ==
In 2018, at age 22, Fry became World Champion at the World Championships for Young Horses in Ermelo, riding Glamourdale in the 7-years old division. She also won at the 2018 European Championships for Grand Prix riders under the age of 25 in Exloo, Netherlands, with her horse Dark Legend.

Fry competed at the 2019 European Championships in Rotterdam, Netherlands where she placed 4th with the British dressage team. She continues to train in Den Hout, Netherlands with former Danish Olympian Anne van Olst.

She was selected to represent Great Britain during the 2020 Olympic Games in Tokyo, Japan. She won the bronze team medal and ended 13th in the individual competition. A month later she won gold at the World Championships for Young Horses in Verden, Germany, with the Dutch-bred Kjento.

In the 2022 FEI World Championships in Herning, Denmark, Charlotte competed with Glamourdale to win Silver in the Grand Prix and Gold in both the Individual Grand Prix Special and the Individual Grand Prix Freestyle. On 16 December 2022, the pair won the 5th leg of the FEI Dressage World Cup, West Europe League, with a personal best of 90.995% in the Freestyle.

In 2024, Fry was eliminated from the dressage World Cup Final in Riyadh, Saudi Arabia after blood was found around her horses mouth. Vets assessed it as a minor injury that would heal quickly.

At the 2024 Amsterdam Grand Prix, in which she competed with Everdale, Fry was one of several riders whose horses were photographed with a blue tongue, suggesting restriction and heavy handedness had cut off oxygen and blood supply to the tongue. Fry and Everdale would go on to win the event.

Representing Great Britain at the 2024 Summer Olympics in Paris, France, Fry won an individual bronze medal in the Grand Prix Freestyle riding Glamourdale, as well as a team bronze medal in the Team Grand Prix Special.

In December 2024, Fry and Glamourdale won the dressage freestyle at the London International Horse Show at the ExCeL, the fifth leg of the Dressage World Cup's Western European League.
