= Pia Laus-Schneider =

Italian equestrian (born 1968)

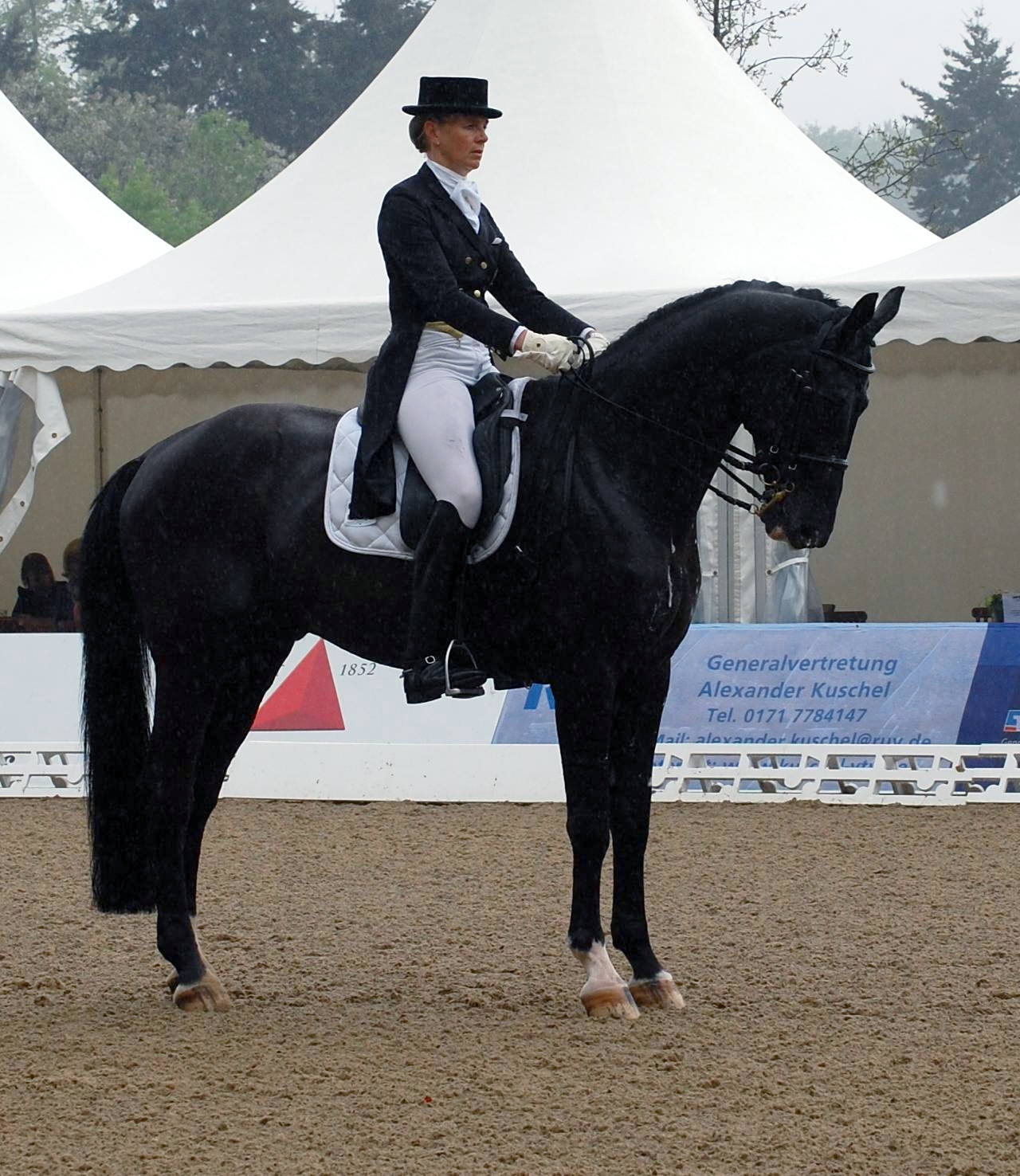
- Aboard Worcester at German Dressage Derby, 2013

Personal information
- Full name: Pia Christine Herta•Laus (-Schneider)
- Nationality: German-born Italian competitor
- Born: 2 May 1968 (age 58) Frankfurt am Main, Germany
- Height: 182 cm (6 ft 0 in)
- Weight: 65 kg (143 lb) (Olympics)

Sport
- Sport: Equestrian
- Event: Dressage
- Club: Centro Ippico Monzese

Pia Laus-Schneider (born 2 May 1968 in Frankfurt am Main) is an Italian equestrian.

After three years competing for the Italian team, in her best-known victory, she won England's Hermes Grand Prix in Goodwood aboard her mount Adrett in July 1991 and again in May 1992. Riding for the Italian National Team, she received her highest placing in Olympic competition in individual dressage and team dressage at the 1992 Summer Olympics in Barcelona. She also competed in dressage at the 1996 Summer Olympics in Atlanta and the 2000 Summer Olympics in Sydney.

== Hermes Grand Prix victories, 1991-1992 ==
Though born in Germany, she began riding for Italy in 1989, her father's native country. In her first attempt at the age of twenty-two, she won England's Hermes Grand Prix Dressage competition in Goodwood aboard Adrett on 5 July 1991. The race was widely followed by the English and European Press, and was considered an Olympic Qualifying event. In a daily double, she also won the Grand Prix Special in Goodwood that year. She was a law student at the time. In the Intermediarie 1, she again rode to victory, this time aboard her mount Liebenberg. Her winning margin in the Grand Prix was a single point against close competitor Isabelle Werth of Germany aboard Winegart, who also placed a close second in the Grand Prix Special. Pia noted in interviews that though her team scores may have been better if she had competed for her native Germany, a country far more dominant in equestrian sports, she had no regrets riding for Italy.

Frequently a stand-out by 1992 in dressage competition when competing internationally, Pia was again a favorite at England's Hermes International Meeting the following year and won the K Group Tokyo Grand Prix at Goodwood on 1 May 1992, but she immediately removed herself from competition after hearing of the death of her father and flew home. In 1992, she was still living in Germany, though riding for the German team.

== Olympic placings ==
Although she placed out of medal contention, her Olympic placings and mounts for dressage included:

- Barcelona, 1992 - Adrett on whom she placed 7th in individual, 8th in team
- Atlanta, 1996 - Liebenberg on whom she placed 34th in individual, 9th in team
- Sydney, 2000 - Renoir on whom she placed 14th riding only individual.

=== Dressage ===
Pia rode for Italy's well-respected Club Centro Ippico Monzese, affiliated with the Italian National Olympic Committee, where students learned not only to ride a horse, but to "respect, love and forge a relationship with the horse", a concept central to the creation of top competitors in dressage.

The fundamental purpose of dressage is to develop, through standardized progressive training methods, a horse's natural athletic ability and willingness to perform, thereby maximizing its potential as a riding horse. Dressage is used to teach horses to be athletes. They learn to carry the weight of the riders, and to carry themselves as well in a more graceful, and balanced manner. Dressage means "training", and it teaches a horse to be safer to ride, more responsive to the rider, and more obedient.

Dressage consists of a series of 39 exercises demonstrating how well the rider communicates with the horse. Included exercises are the walk, trot and canter, as well as having the horse walk backwards, and weave through a pre-determined serpentine course. Four judges score the manoeuvres on a ten-point scale.

== Training ==
Her dressage trainers included the renowned Heinz Lammers, possibly during her earlier years in Germany. Lammers taught in the riding schools in Saerbeck and Greven, Germany, before going independent in 1967. He had a training stable in Olfen and was a highly sought-after coach. In addition to Pia-Laus, his students included Olympians Eva Maria Pracht and Edith Master. Lammers was considered one of the defining personalities in Westphalian (Westphalia region, Germany) equestrian sport, which he helped shape and supervise as state trainer for dressage for almost a quarter of a century. Receiving around 100 medals as a trainer, the Equestrian Association of Westphalia honored Lammers' work with the Golden Plaque of Merit in 2002. He died on 8 February 1922.
