= Ellen Blom =

Norwegian ski mountaineer (born 1979)

Personal information
- Full name: Ellen E. Blom
- Born: 30 November 1979 (age 46) Bodø, Norway

Sport
- Sport: Skiing

Ellen E. Blom (born 30 November 1979) is a Norwegian ski mountaineer.

Blom was born in Bodø. She lives in Oslo, and works at the Norwegian Directorate for Health and Social Affairs.

== Selected results ==
- 2007:
  - 5th, European Championship relay race (together with Lene Pedersen and Bodil Ryste)
  - 7th, European Championship team race (together with Lene Pedersen)
- 2008:
  - 4th, World Championship relay race (together with Lene Pedersen, Bodil Ryste and Marit Tveite Bystøl)
