= Catherine Henriquet =

French equestrian (born 1955)

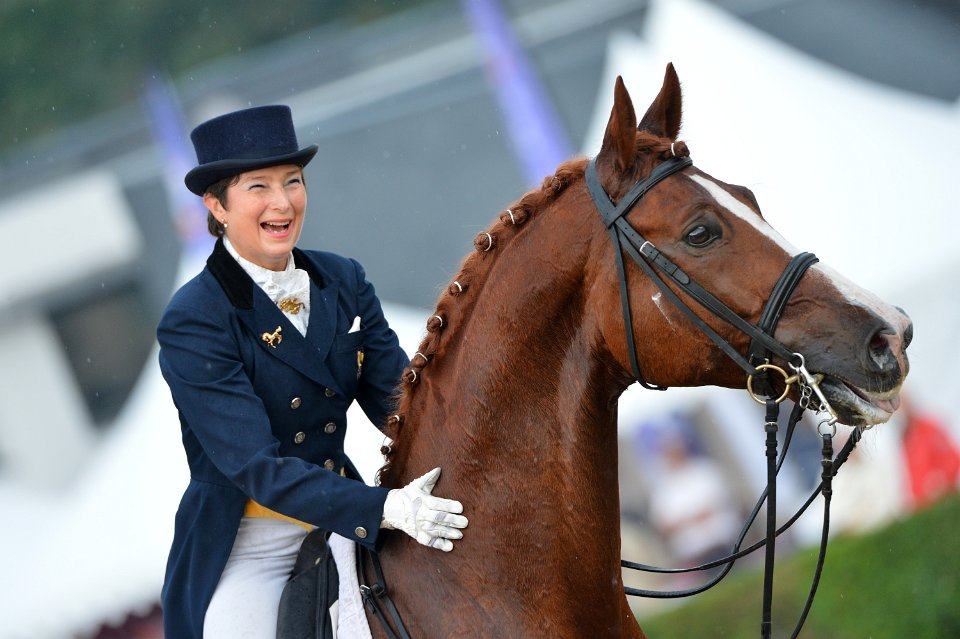
- Henriquet and Paradise Zauber 2013 National Champions

Personal information
- Born: 9 April 1955 (age 69); Casablanca, Marocco
- Spouse: Michel Henriquet

Sport
- Sport: Dressage

Catherine Durand-Henriquet is a French equestrian. She was twice selected for the Equestrian at the Summer Olympics. She brought the first Iberian horse to International and Olympic levels and was also the first rider in the Versailles tradition to ever ride in the Olympic Games. She was national dressage champion multiple times. Together with her husband, famous equestrian and dressage master Michel Henriquet, she wrote a number of major dressage and horse training books and released a young horse training DVD series showing how the Henriquets take young horses from their first time under the saddle to the Grand Prix. Catherine Henriquet still actively shows Hanoverian horses and Lusitano horses at Grand Prix level and has trained dozens of horses to the Grand Prix. She currently rides two horses on the Big Tour: 18.7 hands Hanoverian gelding Lexus Gold and 15.7 hands Lusitano gelding Diabeau du Coussoul. Henriquet is also a retired dermatologist and always maintained professional practice while showing internationally. Having a full time profession aside from riding sometimes got in the way of being able to attend international shows and selections.

== Early life and career ==
Catherine Durand Henriquet is a French dressage rider, trainer and writer born on April 9, 1955. She started riding when she was 12 years old and started showing dressage in 1988 aged 33 under the coaching and guidance of dressage master Michel Henriquet, a longtime friend and student of Nuno Oliveira. After riding in the individual dressage and team dressage at the 1992 Summer Olympics in Barcelona with Iberian horse Orphée, she was selected again to represent France in the 1996 Olympics in Atlanta with Iberian horse Startacus. Unfortunately, Spartacus injured himself the day before the test and she had to withdraw. After retiring him, Catherine continued to be an FEI rider, riding at Grand Prix Dressage level horses that she trains herself.

Always riding at top level she won the gold medal at the French Dressage championship in 2013 with Paradies Zauber. Catherine's late husband, Michel Henriquet, is one of Nuno Oliveira's main students and friends. Together, the three sustained a lifelong friendship and contributed to each other works, thoughts and riding. Today, Catherine Henriquet is one of the greatest specialists of classical dressage, as well as, young horse ground work training. She carries the legacy of late master Michel Henriquet and late master Nuno Oliveira. She brought the French dressage tradition (or Versailles school of dressage) to the international show ring and remains the most successful rider of that tradition so far. She has considerable knowledge of all the old dressage masters writings and is dedicated to sharing what she has learned in a dressage career spanning over three decades. When not at shows, or in the arena training her horses and students, Henriquet clinics with professionals all over Europe.

== Show results ==
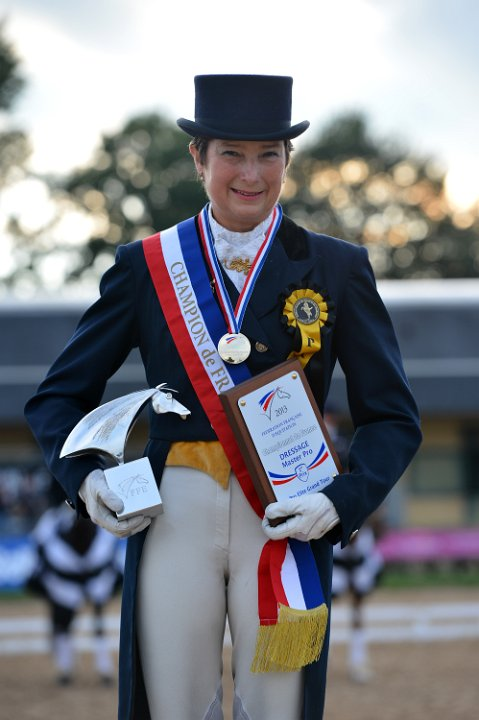
2013 France Championship

- 1992 : 25e individual and 9th team with Orphée at Barcelona's summer Olympics.
- 1996: Qualified with Spartacus for the summer Olympics in Atlanta. However, the horse injured himself before the test and had to be withdrawn. He was retired after that.
- 2004: Won the French Cup (Free style French National Championship) with Carinho des Noes in Saumur (France) and placed 4th in the French Grand Prix Championships.
- 2010: Gold medal at the French national championship Pro 1 Grand Prix
- 2012: Bronze medal at the French national championship Pro 1 Grand Prix
- 2013: Gold Medal Gold medal with Paradies Zauber at the French national championship Pro 1 Big Tour
- 2013: Selected with Paradies Zauber for the 2013 European Dressage Championships but had to withdraw her horse following an injury

== Notable horses ==
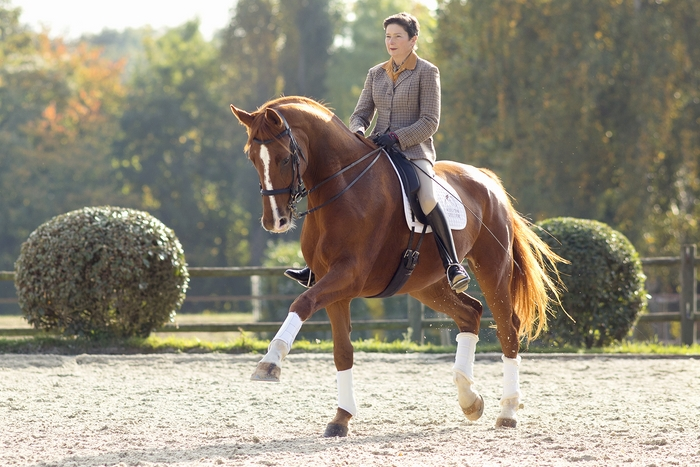
Catherine Henriquet and Hanoverian Gelding Lexus Gold extending the trot

- Orphée RBO: Lusitano stallion born in 1980. Michel Henriquet bought the horse in 1983 and trained him for the next five years. He then passed the ride over to his most talented student, rider Catherine Durand (to become Catherine Henriquet) who would start the horse in the show ring. Durand was a novice at showing and brought the horse through the levels, from Prix Saint George to Grand Prix in just two years. Four years after their competition debut, the team was selected to represent France at Barcelona's Summer Olympics. Orphée was the first Lusitano horse ever to show in a summer Olympics. Making it 25th in individual and ninth as team, they were the second best French horse rider team at those games. The horse retired as a stud stallion in Portugal in 1996.
- Spartacus: Lusitano horse, selected for the 1996 Summer Olympics in Atlanta
- Carinho des Noes: Bay Lusitano stallion born in 1990, Carinho des Noes was a licensed breeding stallion and sired Grand Prix horses Roberto des Frettes (rider Charlotte Haid-Bondergaard), Diabeau du Coussoul (rider Catherine Henriquet) and small tour horse Soberano du Parc (rider Jeremy Roy).
- Farahin des Cloets: Bay Selle Français mare born in 1990
- Laissez Faire: Hanoverian gelding born in 2000
- Vendaval: Lusitano gelding born in 2002
- Paradies Zauber: Sachsen Warmblood born in 2000 who won the French national championship under Henriquet's saddle.
- Lexus Gold: chestnut Hanoverian gelding born in 2009 showing in the Big tour
- Diabeau du Coussoul: bay Lusitano gelding born 2012, showing in the Big tour

== Notable books translated in English ==
- Michel Henriquet et Catherine Durand: Henriquet on dressage, Trafalgar Square Books, 2004

== Notable books in French ==
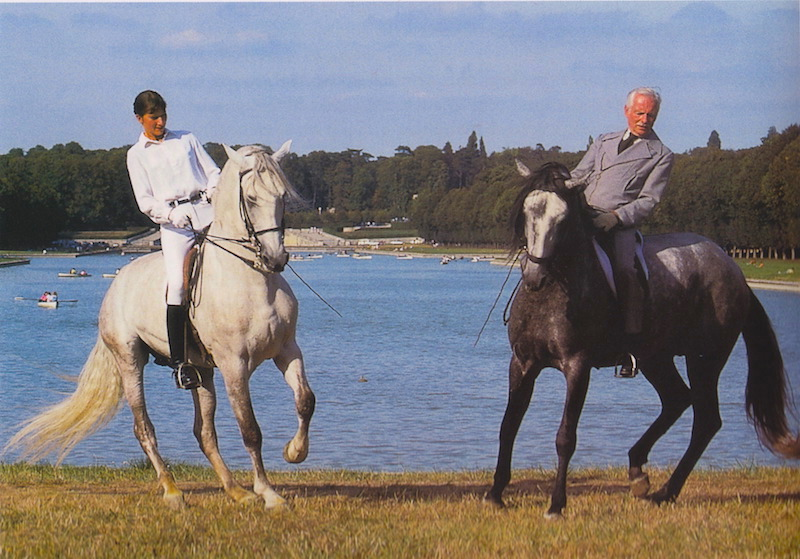
Catherine and Michel Henriquet in Versailles

- Michel Henriquet et Catherine Durand, Gymnase et dressage, Maloine, 1991
- Michel Henriquet et Catherine Henriquet, L'Equitation: un art, une passion
- Michel Henriquet et Catherine Henriquet, Comportement et dressage, Belin, 2009
- Michel Henriquet et Catherine Henriquet, Les Maîtres Français de l'Art équestre, Belin, 2010
- DVDs : Michel et Catherine henriquet : de l'apprentissage au Grand Prix, directed by Laurent Desprez, RDM édition, 2014
