= 2025 FEI World Cup Finals (show jumping and dressage) =

- Host city: Basel, Switzerland
- Date(s): April 2–6, 2025
- Main stadium: St. Jakobshalle
- Level: Senior
- Type: Indoor
- Events: 2

The 2025 FEI World Cup Finals for dressage and show jumping were held from April 2–6, 2025, in Basel, Switzerland. The event was held at St. Jakobshalle and marked the conclusion of the 2024–25 Dressage World Cup and Show Jumping World Cup seasons.

== Results ==
=== Dressage Grand Prix ===
Rank	Rider	Nation	Horse	Score
1	Charlotte Fry	(United Kingdom)	Glamourdale	77.152%
2	Isabell Werth	(Germany)	DSP Quantaz	74.848%
3	Isabel Freese	(Norway)	Total Hope OLD	74.413%

=== Dressage Grand Prix Freestyle ===
Rank	Rider	Nation	Horse	GPF score
1	Charlotte Fry	(United Kingdom)	Glamourdale	88.195%
2	Isabell Werth	(Germany)	DSP Quantaz	84.365%
3	Isabel Freese	(Norway)	Total Hope OLD	81.850%
4	Patrik Kittel	(Sweden)	Touchdown	81.661%

=== Show jumping top 10 Overall ranking ===
Rank	Rider	Nation
1	Julien Epaillard	(France)
2	Ben Maher	(United Kingdom)
3	Kevin Staut	(France)
4	Lillie Keenan	(United States)
5	Martin Fuchs	(Switzerland)
6	Henrik von Eckermann	(Sweden)
7	Richard Vogel	(Germany)
8	Katherine A. Dinan	(United States)
9	Sophie Hinners	(Germany)
10	Hans-Dieter Dreher	(Germany)
