= San Pietro, Gallarate =

Roman Catholic church in Gallarate, Italy

Coordinates: 45°39′36.73″N 8°47′32.37″E

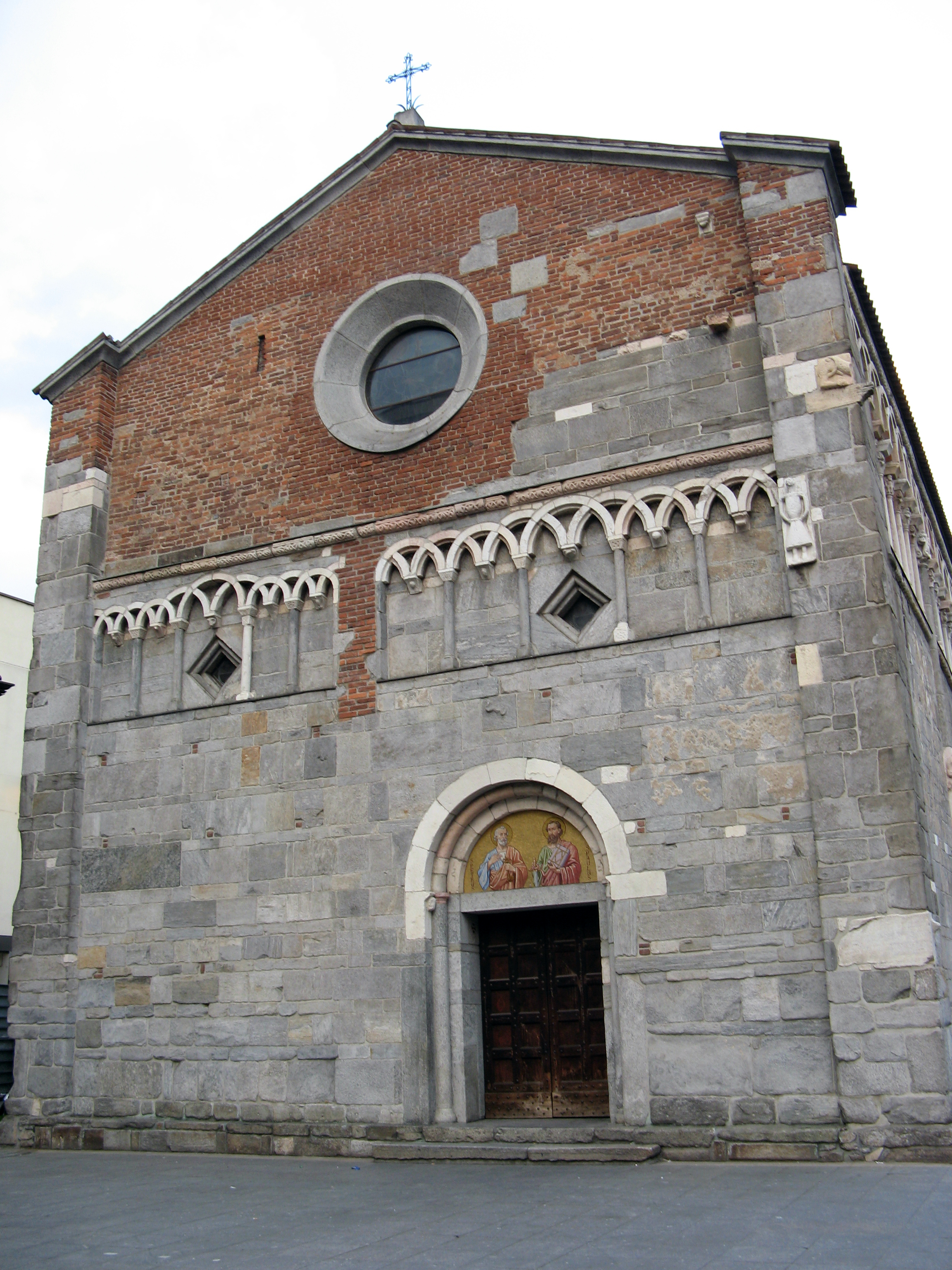

San Pietro is a Romanesque-style Roman Catholic church in Gallarate, region of Lombardy, Italy. This 11th-century church is the oldest in Gallarate. The upper side of the walls of the nave and the hemicycle of the apse have false loggia with columns.
