= Cavaria–Oggiona–Jerago railway station =

Railway station in Lombardy, Italy

Cavaria–Oggiona–Jerago
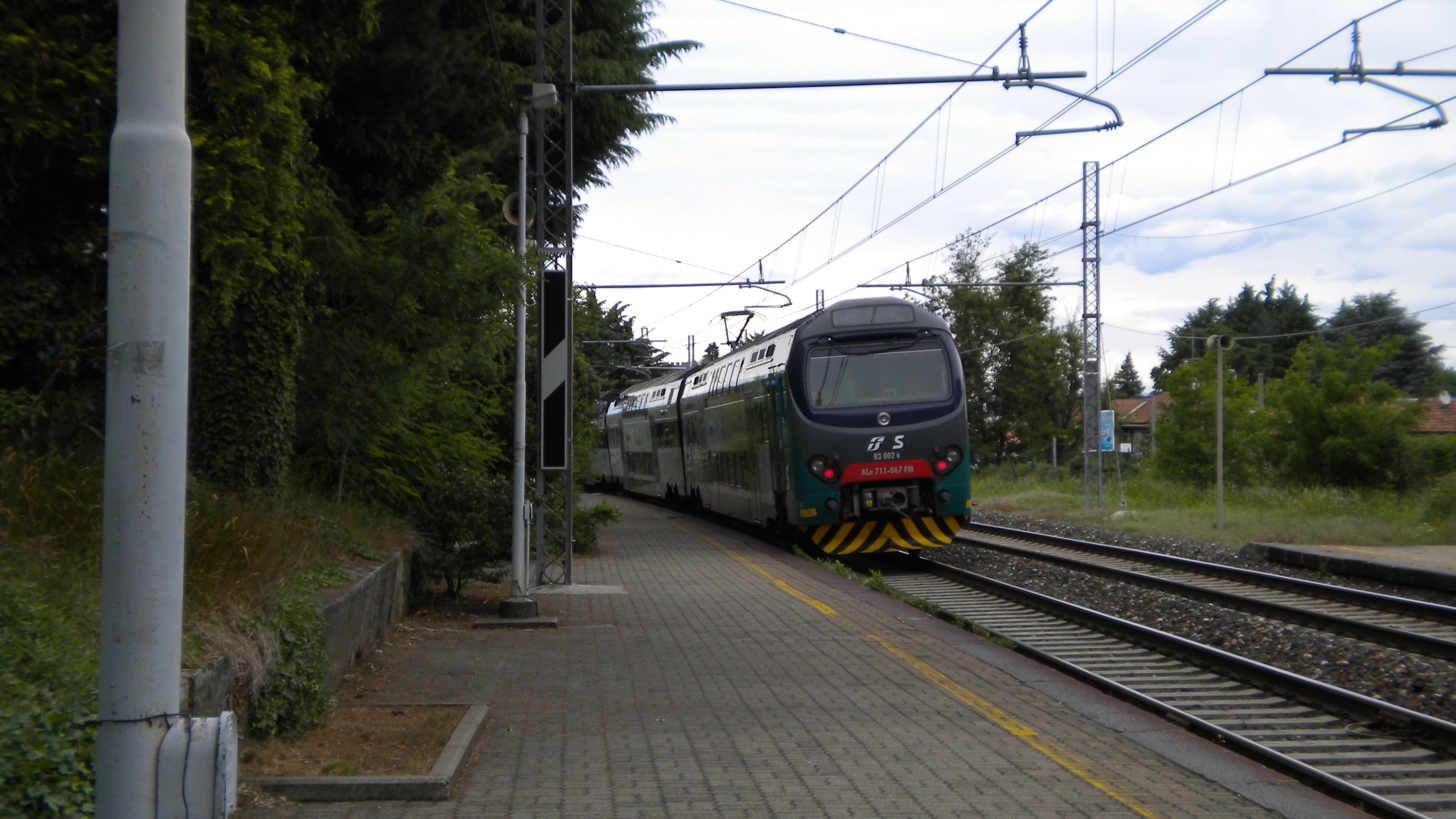

General information
- Location: Via Carlo Curioni; Cavaria con Premezzo, Varese, Lombardy; Italy
- Coordinates: 45°41′53″N 08°48′13″E
- Operator: Rete Ferroviaria Italiana
- Line: Porto Ceresio–Milan
- Distance: 4.637 km (2.881 mi) from Gallarate
- Train operators: Trenord

Other information
- Classification: silver

Services
Preceding station	Trenord	Following station
Albizzate–Solbiate Arno towards Varese	Line S5 (Milan suburban railway service)	Gallarate towards Treviglio
Location
- Location within Lombardy Location within Northern Italy Location within Italy

Cavaria–Oggiona–Jerago railway station is a railway station in Italy. Located on the Porto Ceresio–Milan railway, it serves the municipalities of Cavaria con Premezzo, Oggiona con Santo Stefano and Jerago con Orago.

== Services ==
The station is served by the line S5 of Milan suburban railway network, operated by the lombard railway company Trenord.

== See also ==
- Milan suburban railway network
