= Christine Doan =

Australian equestrian

Personal information
- Born: Christine-Mary Doan; 21 July 1949 (age 76) Midland, Michigan, United States of America

Sport
- Country: Australia
- Sport: Equestrian
- Event: Dressage

Christine Doan (born 21 July 1949 in Midland, Michigan) is a former Australian equestrian, sustainability advocate and technology entrepreneur.

Doan competed at the Barcelona 1992 Olympics in the individual dressage event. Riding Dondolo, Doan finished in 28th place in the individual event.

As of 2020, Doan owns "Malanda North", a property in the Atherton Tablelands, where she promotes sustainable design of technology and the environment.
