= Oggiona con Santo Stefano =

- Comune
- Comune di Oggiona con Santo Stefano
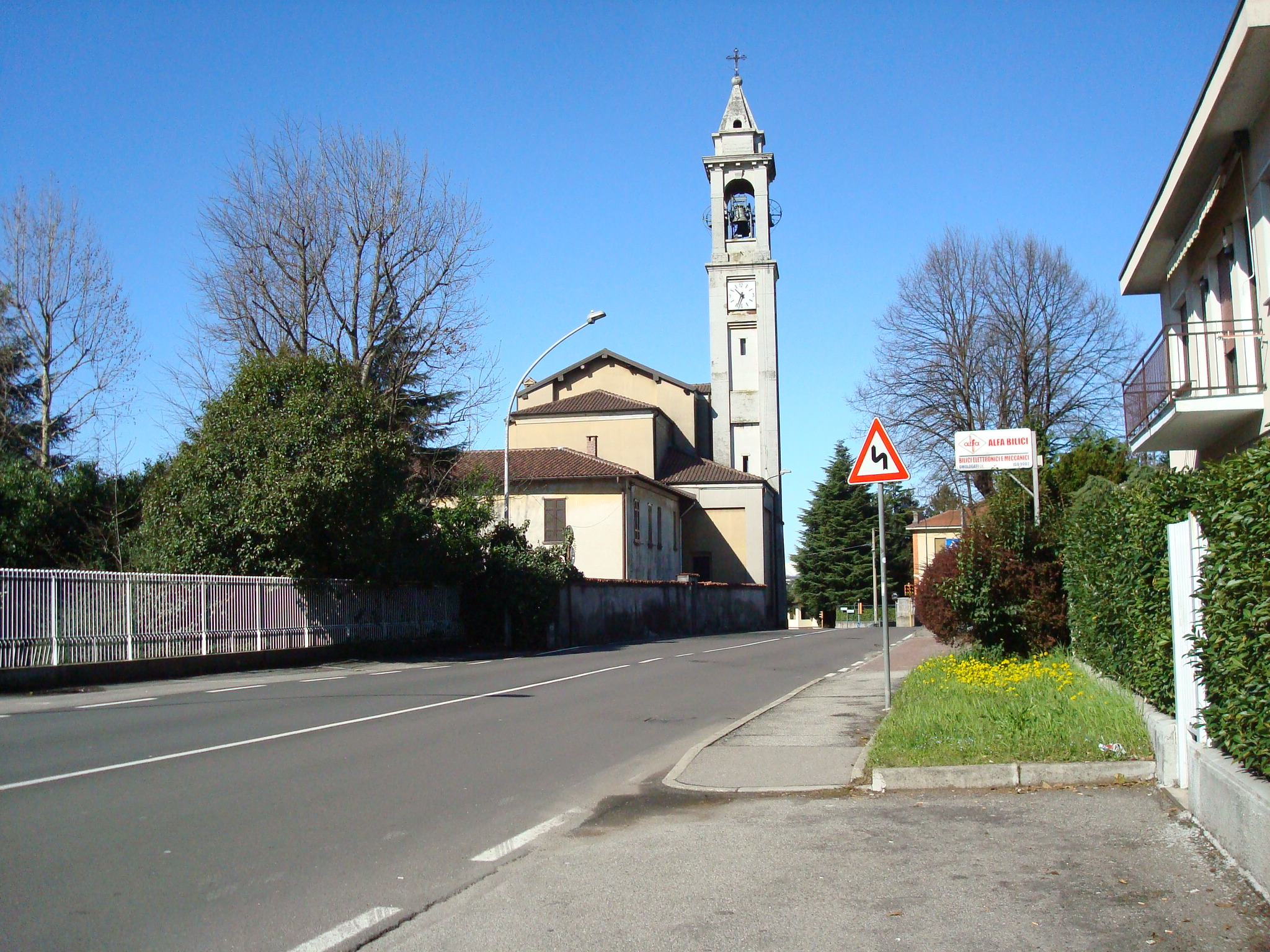

- Location within Italy Location within Lombardy
- Coordinates: 45°43′N 8°50′E
- Country: Italy
- Region: Lombardy
- Province: Province of Varese (VA)

Area
  - Total: 2.7 km^{2} (1.0 sq mi)

Population (Dec. 2004)
  - Total: 4,370
  - Density: 1,600/km^{2} (4,200/sq mi)
- Time zone: UTC+1 (CET)
  - Summer (DST): UTC+2 (CEST)
- Postal code: 21040
- Dialing code: 0331

Oggiona con Santo Stefano is a comune (municipality) in the Province of Varese in the Italian region Lombardy, located about 40 kilometres (25 mi) northwest of Milan and about 11 kilometres (7 mi) south of Varese. As of 31 December 2004, it had a population of 4,370 and an area of 2.7 square kilometres (1.0 mi^{2}).

Oggiona con Santo Stefano borders the following municipalities: Carnago, Cassano Magnago, Cavaria con Premezzo, Jerago con Orago, Solbiate Arno.

It is served by Cavaria-Oggiona-Jerago railway station.

== Demographic evolution ==
Historical population

Year	Pop.	±%
1861	761	—
1871	769	+1.1%
1881	775	+0.8%
1901	804	+3.7%
1911	981	+22.0%

Year	Pop.	±%
1921	1,066	+8.7%
1931	1,292	+21.2%
1936	1,295	+0.2%
1951	1,623	+25.3%
1961	2,067	+27.4%

Year	Pop.	±%
1971	3,039	+47.0%
1981	3,606	+18.7%
1991	4,071	+12.9%
2001	4,276	+5.0%

Source: Data from ISTAT
