= Paolo Giani Margi =

Italian equestrian

Personal information
- Nationality: Italian
- Born: 11 February 1959 (age 66); Gallarate, Italy

Sport
- Sport: Equestrian dressage

Paolo Giani Margi (born 11 February 1959) is an Italian equestrian. He competed at the 1992 Summer Olympics and the 1996 Summer Olympics.
