= Niels Jørgensen =

Danish footballer (born 1971)

Personal information
- Full name: Niels Christian Kold Jørgensen
- Date of birth: 24 January 1971 (age 55)
- Place of birth: Aarhus, Denmark
- Height: 1.90 m (6 ft 3 in)
- Position: Goalkeeper

Senior career*
Years	Team	Apps	(Gls)
1989–1994	Aalborg BK		
1995–1997	Aarhus GF		
1998–1999	Aarhus Fremad	41	(0)

International career
1986–1987	Denmark U17	13	(0)
1987	Denmark U19	1	(0)
1990–1992	Denmark U21	19	(0)
- * Club domestic league appearances and goals

Niels Christian Kold Jørgensen (born 24 January 1971) is a Danish former professional footballer who played as a goalkeeper. He competed in the men's tournament at the 1992 Summer Olympics.
