= Casorate Sempione =

- Comune
- Comune di Casorate Sempione
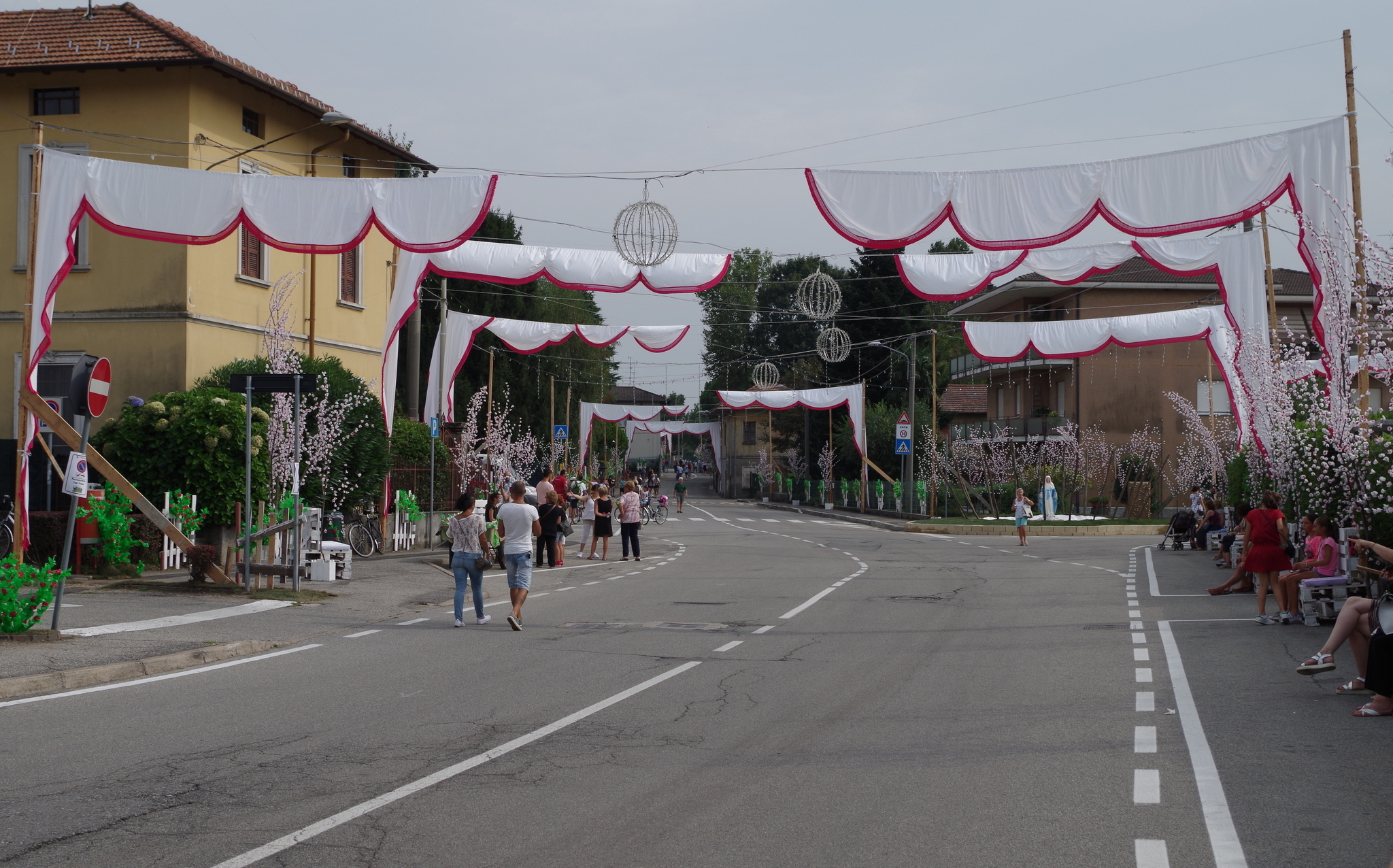

- Location within Italy Location within Lombardy
- Coordinates: 45°40′N 8°44′E
- Country: Italy
- Region: Lombardy
- Province: Province of Varese (VA)

Area
  - Total: 16.9 km^{2} (6.5 sq mi)
- Elevation: 285 m (935 ft)

Population (Dec. 2004)
  - Total: 5,334
  - Density: 316/km^{2} (817/sq mi)
- Demonym: Casoratesi
- Time zone: UTC+1 (CET)
  - Summer (DST): UTC+2 (CEST)
- Postal code: 21011
- Dialing code: 0331
- Website: Official website

Casorate Sempione is a comune (municipality) in the Province of Varese in the Italian region Lombardy, located 40 kilometres (25 mi) northwest of Milan and about 20 kilometres (12 mi) southwest of Varese. As of 31 December 2004, it had a population of 5,334 and an area of 6.9 square kilometres (2.7 mi^{2}).

Casorate Sempione borders the following municipalities: Arsago Seprio, Cardano al Campo, Gallarate, Somma Lombardo.

== Demographic evolution ==
Historical population

Year	Pop.	±%
1861	941	—
1871	1,152	+22.4%
1881	1,410	+22.4%
1901	2,004	+42.1%
1911	2,156	+7.6%

Year	Pop.	±%
1921	2,079	−3.6%
1931	2,453	+18.0%
1936	2,409	−1.8%
1951	3,060	+27.0%
1961	3,843	+25.6%

Year	Pop.	±%
1971	4,391	+14.3%
1981	4,308	−1.9%
1991	4,510	+4.7%
2001	5,070	+12.4%

Source: Data from ISTAT

== Culture ==
=== San Tito ===
In Casorate it is still celebrated the party of San Tito, that has been celebrated for the first time in 1926, in order to remember the XV centenary of the death of the martyr. The party is revived every ten years for an amount of time of a couple of weeks. The last edition has taken place in September 2016.

== Twin towns ==
Casorate Sempione is twinned with:

- Saint-Étienne-de-Saint-Geoirs, France
- Saint-Geoirs, France
- Saint-Michel-de-Saint-Geoirs, France
