= Lene Pedersen =

Norwegian ski mountaineer (born 1977)

Personal information
- Born: 28 April 1977 (age 49) Bodø, Norway

Sport
- Sport: Skiing

Lene Pedersen (born 28 April 1977) is a Norwegian ski mountaineer.

Pedersen was born in Bodø. She started ski mountaineering in 2006 and competed first in the same year. She lives in Elverum Municipality.

== Selected results ==
- 2005:
  - 1st, Norwegian Championship
  - 1st, Norwegian Cup
- 2007:
  - 5th, European Championship relay race (together with Ellen Blom and Bodil Ryste)
  - 7th, European Championship team race (together with Ellen Blom)
- 2008:
  - 4th, World Championship relay race (together with Ellen Blom, Bodil Ryste and Marit Tveite Bystøl)
  - 7th, World Championship combination ranking
  - 8th, World Championship team race (together with Marit Tveite Bystøl)
