= Mette Nielsen (swimmer) =

Danish swimmer (born 1975)

Personal information
- Born: 28 February 1975 (age 51) Esbjerg, Denmark

Sport
- Sport: Swimming
- Club: Sædding-Guldager IF, Esbjerg
Medal record
Women's swimming
Representing Denmark
European Championships
Bronze medal – third place	1991 Athens	4×100 m freestyle

Mette Nørskov Nielsen (born 28 February 1975) is a Danish retired swimmer who won a bronze medal at the 1991 European Aquatics Championships. She also competed at the 1992 and 1996 Summer Olympics in five events; her best achievement was sixth place in the 4 × 100 m freestyle relay in 1992.
