= Robert Pracht =

Karl Robert Pracht (born April 12, 1878, Mulhouse; d. May 4, 1961, Karlsruhe) was a German composer and music educator. He is well known for his piano and string works as well as his numerous choral compositions.

Pracht was born in Mulhouse; his father was kapellmeister Robert Ottmar Pracht. After finishing basic education he studied at the Meersburg teaching school and then at the Mannheim Academy of Music from 1900 to 1904. In the meantime he finished his staatsexamen (master's degree) in 1902 in Karlsruhe.

After teaching a period in Meersburg, Pracht had been appointed music teacher at the Humboldt Gymnasium in Karlsruhe where he worked more than two decades until retiring in 1945. As a teacher he published many music education works for piano, strings and brass as well as musicological papers.

Additionally, Pracht was a renowned conductor of various men's choirs all over Baden and composed more than 200 traditional choir songs. In 1953 he was awarded the Federal Cross of Merit.

Pracht died in 1961 in Karlsruhe at the age of 83.

== Selected compositions ==
- Choral songs
  - Das Morgenrot
  - Der Tag bricht an
  - Deutscher Frühling
  - Drei Nelken
  - Drei Rosen
  - Ewige Melodie
  - Lenzlust
  - Mein Hegau
  - Moorgrab
  - O deutscher Wald
  - Roland
  - Sonntag ist heut
  - Wanderlust
  - Weinland
  - Wirtin, schenk ein
- Piano works
  - Berceuse und Scherzo für Klavier
  - Jugendalbum für Klavier
  - Stimmungsbilder für Klavier
- Works for chamber music and orchestra
