= Jørgen Herlufsen =

Danish sports shooter (born 1964)

Personal information
- Nationality: Danish
- Born: 4 March 1964 (age 61); Skive, Denmark

Sport
- Sport: Sports shooting

Jørgen Herlufsen (born 4 March 1964) is a Danish sports shooter. He competed at the 1988 Summer Olympics and the 1992 Summer Olympics.
