= Carol Lavell =

American equestrian (1943–2023)

Personal information
- Full name: Carol Cadwgan Lavell
- Born: April 8, 1943 Newport, Rhode Island, U.S.
- Died: March 27, 2023 (aged 79) Fairview, North Carolina, U.S.
Medal record
Equestrian
Representing the United States
Olympic Games
Bronze medal – third place	1992 Barcelona	Team dressage
World Championships
Bronze medal – third place	1994 The Hague	Team dressage
Pan American Games
Gold medal – first place	2003 Santo Domingo	Team dressage
Silver medal – second place	1987 Indianapolis	Team dressage

Carol Cadwgan Lavell (April 8, 1943 – March 27, 2023) was an American equestrian.

== Biography ==
Lavell was born in Newport, Rhode Island, on April 8, 1943. Lavell won a bronze medal in team dressage at the 1992 Summer Olympics in Barcelona, together with Robert Dover, Charlotte Bredahl, and Michael Poulin.

She competed at the Palm Beach Dressage Derby, 1990 FEI World Equestrian Games, and 1994 FEI World Equestrian Games. She won a silver medal at the 1987 Pan American Games. and gold medals at the 1991 U.S. Grand Prix Champions and 1992 U.S. Grand Prix Champions.

Lavell died on March 27, 2023, at the age of 79.

She created the Carol Lavell Advanced Dressage Prize .
