= Ann Behrenfors =

Swedish equestrian

Personal information
- Nationality: Swedish
- Born: 8 February 1961 (age 64); Torpa, Sweden

Sport
- Sport: Equestrian

Ann Behrenfors (born 8 February 1961) is a Swedish equestrian. She competed in two events at the 1992 Summer Olympics.
