= Serge Cornut =

French equestrian

Personal information
- Nationality: French
- Born: 6 May 1948 (age 76); Frangy, France

Sport
- Sport: Equestrian

Serge Cornut (born 6 May 1948) is a French equestrian. He competed in two events at the 1992 Summer Olympics.
