= Daria Fantoni =

Italian equestrian (born 1942)

Personal information
- Nationality: Italian
- Born: 24 January 1942 (age 83); Turin, Italy

Sport
- Sport: Equestrian

Daria Fantoni (born 24 January 1942) is an Italian equestrian. She competed at the 1988 Summer Olympics, the 1992 Summer Olympics and the 1996 Summer Olympics.
