= Michael Poulin =

American equestrian

Personal information
- Full name: Michael Brian Poulin
- Born: June 10, 1945 (age 81) Newport, Rhode Island, U.S.
Medal record
Equestrian
Representing the United States
Olympic Games
| Bronze medal – third place | 1992 Barcelona | Team dressage |

Michael Brian Poulin (born June 10, 1945) is an American equestrian. He was born in Newport, Rhode Island. He won a bronze medal in team dressage at the 1992 Summer Olympics in Barcelona, together with Robert Dover, Carol Lavell and Charlotte Bredahl.
