= Laura Fry =

British equestrian (1967–2012)

Personal information
- Nationality: British
- Born: 13 January 1967 Totnes, England
- Died: 26 September 2012 (aged 45) Cottingham, England

Sport
- Sport: Equestrian
Medal record
Equestrian
Representing Great Britain
European Championships
Silver medal – second place	1993 Lipica	Team dressage

Laura Fry (13 January 1967 – 26 September 2012) was a British equestrian. She competed in two events at the 1992 Summer Olympics. She died from breast cancer, aged 45.

== Early life ==
Her parents married on May 17, 1958 at St George's church in Dittisham. Her father, Antony, was in the 2nd Dragoon Guards (Queen's Bays), the son of a Lt-Col from Ipplepen in Devon, originally from Soberton in Hampshire. Her mother was from Dittisham in Devon. A brother was born on October 22, 1959. Her grandfather Douglas died on September 28, 1982, aged 91.

Laura Shewen, attended Taunton School, with father Lt-Col Tony Shewen, and grew up in Bickenhall in Somerset. Her father was manager of Taunton Racecourse from 1986 to 1997, and died aged 77 in February 2005. Her mother died in March 2023, aged 88.

== Personal life ==
She married Simon Fry of Otford in Surrey, in 1990, and moved there.

Her daughter, Charlotte Fry, is also an equestrian, and won Bronze in the Team Dressage at the 2020 Tokyo Olympics.
