= Cardano al Campo =

Municipality in Lombardy, Italy

Cardano al Campo Cardan (Lombard)
- Comune
- Comune di Cardano al Campo
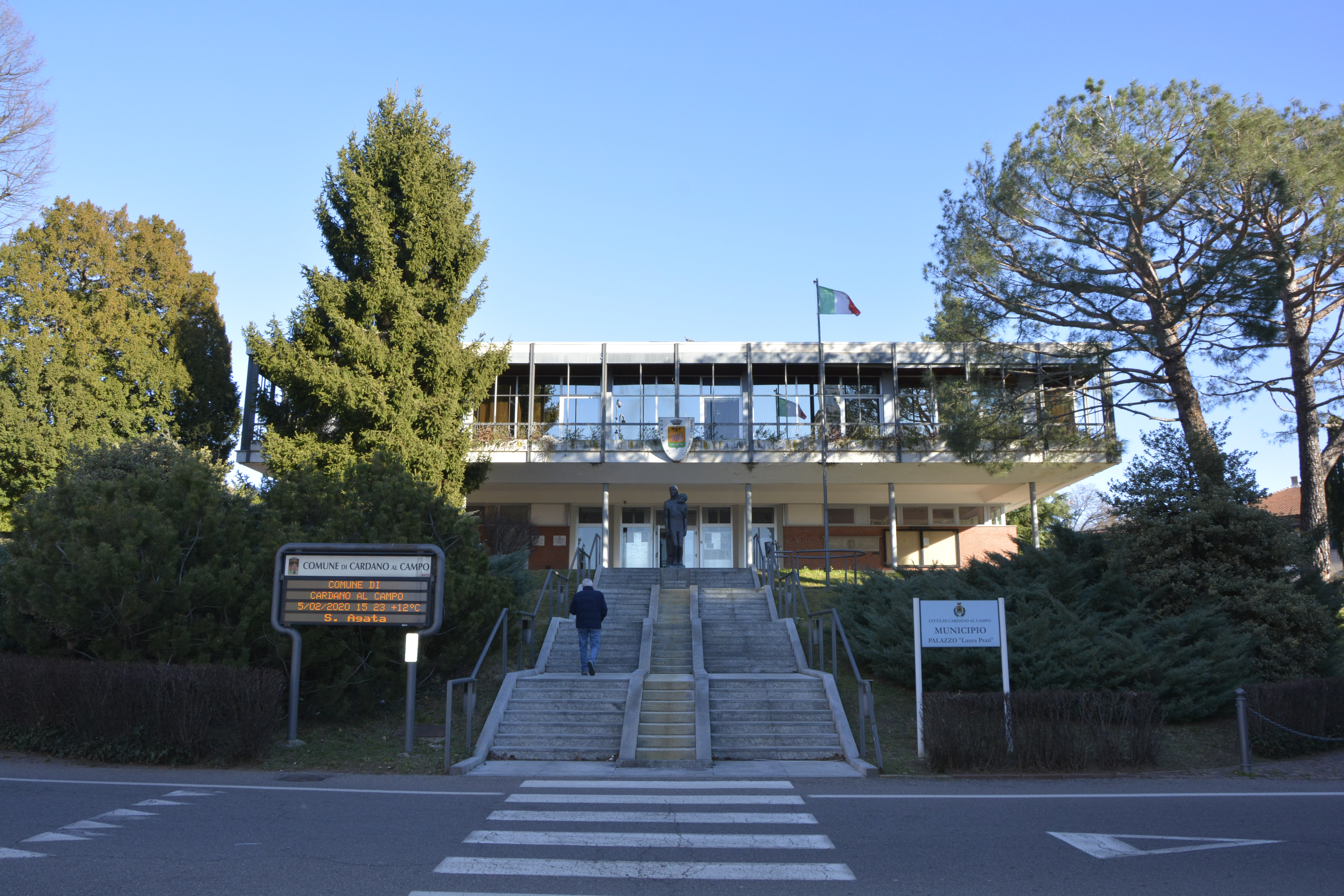

- Coat of arms

- Location within Italy Location within Lombardy
- Coordinates: 45°40′N 08°44′E
- Country: Italy
- Region: Lombardy
- Province: Varese (VA)

Government
  - Mayor: Angelo Bellora

Area
  - Total: 9 km^{2} (3.5 sq mi)

Population (1 January 2008)
  - Total: 13,757
  - Density: 1,500/km^{2} (4,000/sq mi)
- Demonym: Cardanesi
- Time zone: UTC+1 (CET)
  - Summer (DST): UTC+2 (CEST)
- Postal code: 21010
- Dialing code: 0331
- Patron saint: Sant'Anastasio
- Saint day: 22 January
- Website: Official website

Cardano al Campo is a town and comune (municipality) located in the province of Varese, in the Lombardy region of northern Italy.

Cardano al Campo is situated 2 km from Milan-Malpensa Airport and 35 km from Milan, being an affluent suburban town of the Milan metropolitan area.

The comune of Cardano al Campo is part of the natural area of the Parco naturale lombardo della Valle del Ticino and includes wooded areas with cycling trails.

== Origins of the name ==
Historians believe the name of the town may be derived from either carduus, a genus of flowering plants, or "-kar", a rock or a rocky terrain.

== Notable Buildings ==
=== Religious Architecture ===
- Church of Sant'Anastasio Martire
- Church of San Pietro
- Church of Natività di Maria Vergine
- Church of Santa Maria Nascente

== Twin towns ==
- Stigliano, Italy
- Zarautz, Spain
