= Irina Zuykova =

Soviet equestrian

Personal information
- Nationality: Soviet
- Born: 30 May 1958
- Died: 25 December 2010 (aged 52)

Sport
- Sport: Equestrian

Irina Zuykova (30 May 1958 – 25 December 2010) was a Soviet equestrian. She competed in two events at the 1992 Summer Olympics.
