= Annica Westerberg =

Swedish equestrian

Personal information
- Full name: Britt Annica Westerberg
- Nationality: Swedish
- Born: 25 January 1953 (age 72); Hjulsbro, Linköping, Sweden

Sport
- Sport: Equestrian

Britt Annica Westerberg (born 25 January 1953) is a Swedish equestrian. She competed in two events at the 1992 Summer Olympics.
