= Laura Conz Dall'Ora =

Italian equestrian

Personal information
- Nationality: Italian
- Born: 1 September 1962 (age 62); Milan, Italy

Sport
- Sport: Equestrian

Laura Conz Dall'Ora (born 1 September 1962) is an Italian equestrian. She competed in two events at the 1992 Summer Olympics.
