= Inna Zhurakovska =

Ukrainian equestrian

Personal information
- Native name: Інна Олександрівна Жураковська
- Full name: Inna Oleksandrivna Zhurakovska
- Nationality: Ukrainian
- Born: 2 April 1956 (age 70) Illintsi, Ukraine

Sport
- Sport: Equestrian
Medal record
Equestrian
Representing the Soviet Union
European Championships
Silver medal – second place	1991 Donaueschingen	Team dressage

Inna Oleksandrivna Zhurakovska (Ukrainian: Інна Олександрівна Жураковська, born 2 April 1956), also known as Inna Aleksandrovna Zhurakovskaya (Russian: Инна Александровна Жураковская), is a Ukrainian equestrian. She competed for the Unified Team in two events at the 1992 Summer Olympics.
