= Eva Karin Oscarsson-Göthberg =

Swedish equestrian

Personal information
- Nationality: Swedish
- Born: 24 July 1953 (age 71); Stockholm, Sweden

Sport
- Sport: Equestrian

Eva Karin Oscarsson-Göthberg (born 24 July 1953) is a Swedish equestrian. She competed in two events at the 1992 Summer Olympics.
