= Charlotte Bredahl =

American equestrian

Personal information
- Born: 21 April 1957 (age 69) Copenhagen, Denmark
Medal record
Equestrian
Representing the United States
Olympic Games
Bronze medal – third place	1992 Barcelona	Team dressage

Charlotte Bredahl (born 21 April 1957) is an American equestrian. She was born in Copenhagen, Denmark. She won a bronze medal in team dressage at the 1992 Summer Olympics in Barcelona, together with Robert Dover, Carol Lavell and Michael Poulin.
