= Ruth Hunkeler =

Swiss equestrian (born 1940)

Personal information
- Nationality: Swiss
- Born: 18 January 1940 (age 85)

Sport
- Sport: Equestrian

Ruth Hunkeler (born 18 January 1940) is a Swiss equestrian. She competed in two events at the 1992 Summer Olympics.
