= Carol Parsons =

British equestrian

Personal information
- Nationality: British
- Born: 6 February 1956 (age 69) Saint Helier, Jersey

Sport
- Sport: Equestrian

Carol Parsons (born 6 February 1956) is a British equestrian. She competed in two events at the 1992 Summer Olympics.
