= Martina Pracht =

Canadian equestrian

Personal information
- Nationality: Canadian
- Born: 11 April 1964 (age 62) Frankfurt, West Germany (now Germany)

Sport
- Sport: Equestrian
Medal record
Equestrian
Representing Canada
Pan American Games
Gold medal – first place	1987 Indianapolis	Team dressage
Silver medal – second place	1987 Indianapolis	Individual dressage

Martina Pracht (born 11 April 1964) is a Canadian equestrian. She competed in two events at the 1992 Summer Olympics.

She was a daughter and a granddaughter of fellow Olympians, Eva Maria Pracht and Josef Neckermann, respectively.
