= Gallarate =

- Comune
- City of Gallarate
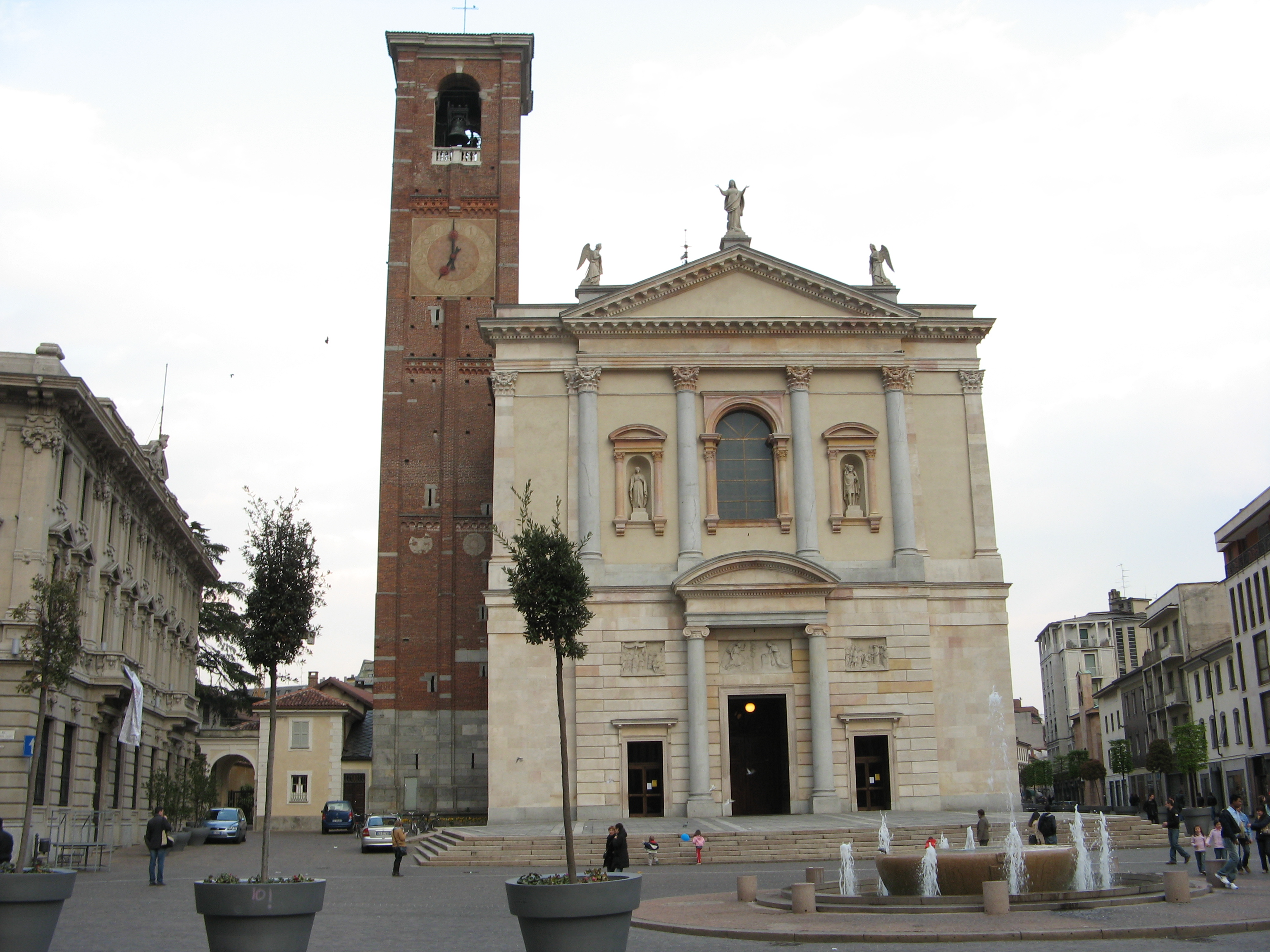
- Basilica of Santa Maria Assunta.

- Coat of arms

- Location within Italy Location within Lombardy
- Coordinates: 45°40′N 8°48′E
- Country: Italy
- Region: Lombardy
- Province: Varese (VA)

Government
  - Mayor: Andrea Cassani (League)

Area
  - Total: 20 km^{2} (7.7 sq mi)
- Elevation: 238 m (781 ft)

Population (January 1st, 2025)
  - Total: 52,886
  - Density: 2,600/km^{2} (6,800/sq mi)
- Demonym: Gallaratesi
- Time zone: UTC+1 (CET)
  - Summer (DST): UTC+2 (CEST)
- Postal code: 21013
- Dialing code: 0331
- ISTAT code: 12070
- Patron saint: St. Christopher
- Saint day: 25 July
- Website: Official website

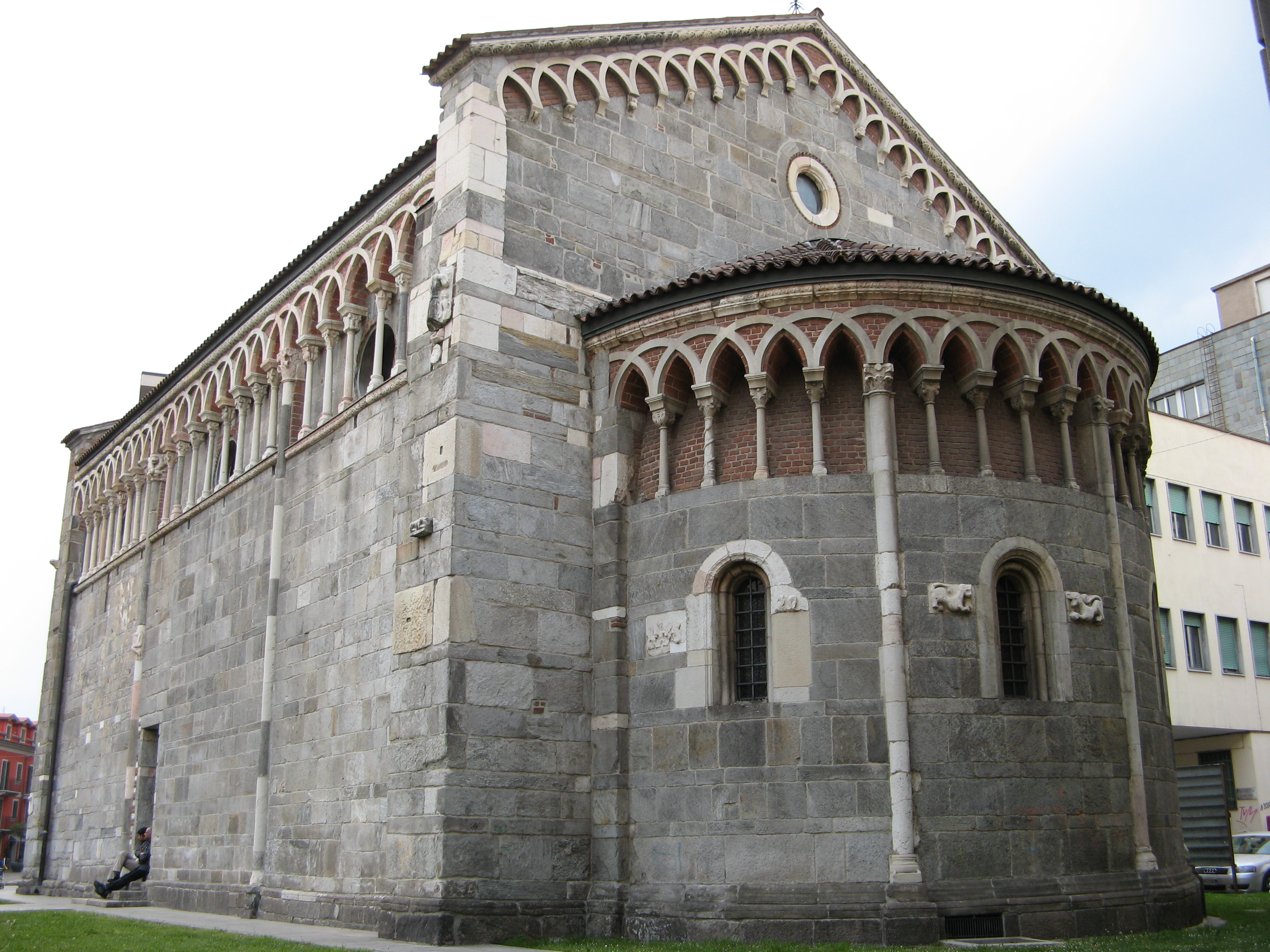
Church of San Pietro.

Gallarate (Italian: [ɡallaˈraːte]; Lombard: Galaraa) is a city and comune of Alto Milanese of Lombardy and of Milan metropolitan area, northern Italy, in the Province of Varese. It has a population of 52.886 people (Jan 2025).

It is located at the junction of railways to Varese, Laveno and Arona. Some 10 kilometres (6 miles) to the west are the electric works of Vizzola, where 23,000 hp are derived from the river Ticino. Its territory is crossed by the river Arnetta and belongs to the Ticino Natural Park.

The city had a strong textile industry in the first part of the 19th century.

In common with other nearby cities, such as Casorate Sempione and Samarate, its name comes from Latin.

== History ==
Founded by the Gauls and later conquered by the Romans, Gallarate was mentioned as an important vicus or village in documents dating back to the Roman conquest of what was then called Gallia Cisalpina. After the Carolingian conquest of northern-central Italy, a castle was erected upon the remains of the original Roman fortifications located beside the still-existing Basilica of Santa Maria. The castle has disappeared, but its ancient location is identified through the city's topography and by the street name Via Postcastello.

After the obliteration of Castelseprio by Ottone Visconti in 1287, Gallarate became the capital of the vast Seprio county. During these years, Gallarate saw a period of prosperity and economic growth that would last for the rest of Visconti control, until the beginning of French rule two centuries later (1498). Documents in the National Archives refer to Gallarate as an important centre of commercial exchange between both Italian and foreign markets, particularly for cotton, drapes, flax and textiles. Distinguished families such as the Rosnati, Reina, Masera, Palazzi, Macchi, Curioni, Mari and the Guenzati represented the nobility and the merchant classes. This period was also noted as a time of great civic improvement and the beginning of Gallarate as a centre of industrial activity.

In the late 15th century, the city fell under foreign domination, initially under the Spanish and then under the French (and then again Spanish and their Austrian successors), a condition which lasted until the 19th century. In between this political instability, Gallarate became a private fief of some of the competing noble Italian families such as the Bentivoglio, Pallavicino, Caracciolo, Altemps, Visconti, and Castelbarco.

Gallarate became a part of the Kingdom of Italy in 1859 and received the honorary title of city with a royal decree on 19 December 1860.

By the latter half of the 19th century, modern industry had begun to take over many areas of Italy. In a few decades, Gallarate became an important industrial city. This period was also marked by heavy social tensions brought about by the rapid political and economic changes wrought by Gallarate's own industrial revolution. Nowadays, Gallarate's industrial structure no longer includes these giant industrial powerhouses of the past. Their existence, however, is still marked out by the presence of the high chimneys, which are still visible along Gallarate's skyline. Many of the old Liberty style buildings, where thousands of Gallaratesi worked during the past century and a half, have been turned into new modern multi-level shopping centres and plazas.

In 2026, the city was included in the route of the Milano-Cortina Winter Olympics torch relay, with American rapper Snoop Dogg serving as one of the torchbearers in the city centre.

== Main sights ==
- San Pietro: Romanesque church built in the 11th to 13th centuries, including some Gothic elements. The interior has a nave without aisles. The façade, the apse and the sides are characterized by arcades supported by small columns forming a fake loggia. It was declared a national monument in 1844.
- Santa Maria Assunta: church located in the city centre and in autumn 2016 the local government started works of restoration
- Baroque church of Sant'Antonio Abate
- Sanctuary of Madonna di Campagna, dating to the early 17th century.
- Church of San Zenone (18th century)
- Church of San Rocco (16th century)
- Historical pharmacy Dahò, where the carbonari used to hide in the 19th century, owned by Dott. Renata Minoli. The pharmacy is located in Piazza Garibaldi, in which there is a statue of Giuseppe Garibaldi.
- Museo MAGA (Museo d’Arte Gallarate-Art Museum of Gallarate) museum which holds over 5,000 pieces of modern and contemporary art.

== Economy ==
In the 19th and 20th centuries Gallarate was an important centre for the textile industry. Now it is a local hub for transport and high-tech industries.

== Education ==
The Sistema Bibliotecario Consortile Antonio Panizzi has its main offices in Gallarate. The system operates the Biblioteca Civica " Luigi Majno " in Gallarate. Gallarate is also the seat of the Aloysianum, a former Jesuit college, which is now a Jesuit cultural centre with an important library. Carlo Maria Martini spent the last years of his life there.

In 2010 the local government built a modern art museum called Museo MAGA, hosting a Missoni exhibition in honour of the deceased Ottavio Missoni. MAGA is a focal point for local student research and adult education.

== Transport ==
Gallarate railway station, opened in 1860, is the junction of the railway lines Domodossola–Milan, Luino–Milan and Porto Ceresio–Milan. The station is a stop for several long-running trains (EuroCity from Milan to Geneva and Basel), of regional trains from Milan to Domodossola, and of line S5 of Milan suburban railway service, and line S30 of Ticino railway network.
