= Jerago con Orago =

- Comune
- Comune di Jerago con Orago
- Coat of arms

- Location within Italy Location within Lombardy
- Coordinates: 45°42′N 8°48′E
- Country: Italy
- Region: Lombardy
- Province: Varese (VA)

Government
  - Mayor: Emilio Aliverti

Area
  - Total: 4.0 km^{2} (1.5 sq mi)

Population (2008)
  - Total: 5,003
  - Density: 1,300/km^{2} (3,200/sq mi)
- Demonym(s): Jeraghesi and Oraghesi
- Time zone: UTC+1 (CET)
  - Summer (DST): UTC+2 (CEST)
- Postal code: 21040
- Dialing code: 0331
- Website: Official website

Jerago con Orago (Lombard: Ieragh cont Oragh) is a town and a comune (municipality) in the Province of Varese in the Italian region Lombardy, located about 40 kilometres (25 mi) northwest of Milan and about 13 kilometres (8 mi) south of Varese. It is formed by two main centres of Orago and Jerago (which houses the municipal seat), sharing a 13th-century castle.

It is served by Cavaria-Oggiona-Jerago railway station.

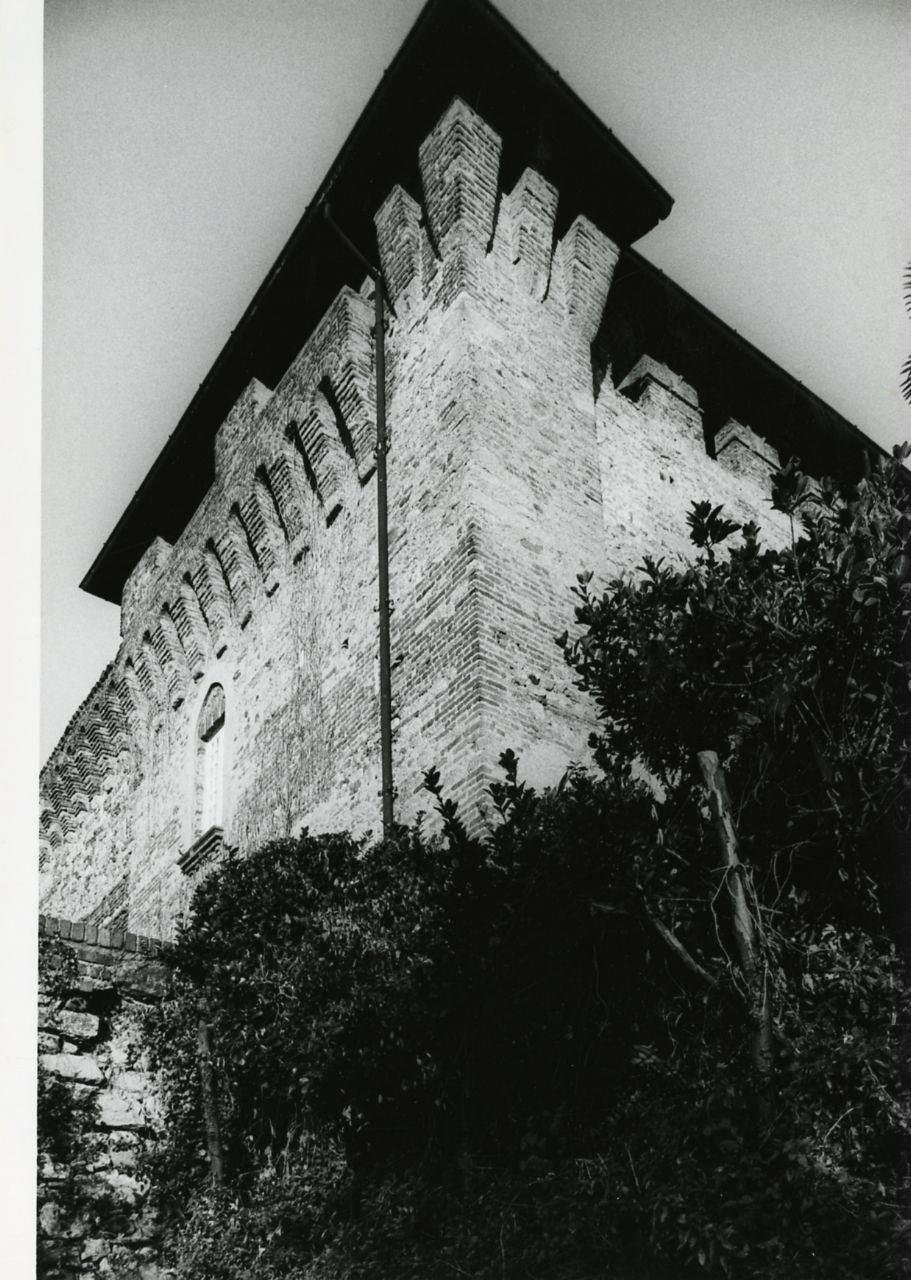
Jerago, 1980 (Paolo Monti)
