= Bent Jensen (equestrian) =

Danish equestrian

Personal information
- Nationality: Danish
- Born: 21 May 1955 (age 69); Copenhagen, Denmark

Sport
- Sport: Equestrian

Bent Jensen (born 21 May 1955) is a Danish equestrian. He competed in two events at the 1992 Summer Olympics.
