= Lene Hoberg =

Danish equestrian

Personal information
- Nationality: Danish
- Born: 11 March 1959 (age 66); Copenhagen, Denmark

Sport
- Sport: Equestrian

Lene Hoberg (born 11 March 1959) is a Danish equestrian. She competed in two events at the 1992 Summer Olympics.
