= Anne van Olst =

Danish equestrian (born 1962)

Medal record

Equestrian

Representing Denmark

Olympic Games
Bronze medal – third place	2008 Beijing	Team dressage

European Championships
Bronze medal – third place	1999 Arnhem	Team dressage

Anne van Olst (born 25 March 1962 in Aalborg, Nordjylland), also known as Anne Koch Jensen, is a Danish dressage rider. She was part of the Bronze winning Danish team at the Olympic games in Beijing 2008 and finished 23rd in the individual dressage at the 2012 Summer Olympics, riding Clearwater.

In 1991 Anne married to the Dutch breeder and horse dealer Gert-Jan van Olst and moved to The Netherlands. Together they run a sport and breeding stable in Den Hout, Netherlands. Anne is also active as trainer and coaches several international riders, including her pupil Charlotte Fry.
