= Alto Milanese =

Region in Lombardy

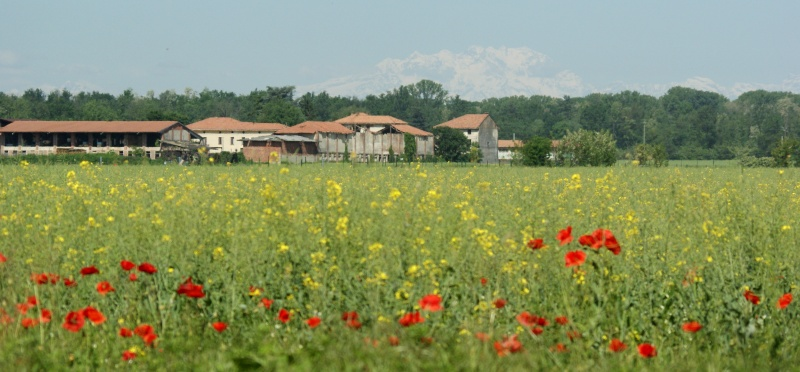
- Alto Milanese in the area of Origgio
- Interactive map of Alto Milanese
- Country: Italy
- Region: Lombardy

Area
  - Total: 235 km^{2} (91 sq mi)

Population
  - Total: 700,000 (2,007)
- Time zones: UTC+1
- UTC+2
- Northwestern part of the Metropolitan City of Milan, southern part of the province of Varese and some municipalities in the southwestern part of the province of Como

The term Alto Milanese (Alt Milanes in Lombard), also called Altomilanese, is used to refer to the territory of Lombardy that includes the northwestern part of the metropolitan city of Milan, the southern part of the province of Varese and some municipalities in the southwestern part of the province of Como. It largely corresponds with one of the Italian provinces planned in the past: the province of Seprio. The Alto Milanese can be divided into four zones having their respective major cities as their main centers: the Bustese, Legnanese, Gallaratese and Saronnese. The major rivers of the Alto Milanese are the Olona and the Ticino, while among the noteworthy streams are the Arno, the Tenore, the Bozzente, the Lura, the Rile, and the Strona.

The core of the Alto Milanese consists of the Olona conurbation, i.e. the urban area including, from north to south, the cities of Gallarate, Busto Arsizio, and Legnano. Alto Milanese, which is one of the most industrialized and densely populated areas in Italy, has a population of about 700,000 inhabitants spread over an area of 235 square kilometers. The primary communication network consists of the Autostrada dei laghi (A8 Milan-Varese, A9 Lainate-Como-Chiasso and A26 Gallarate-Gattico branch road), Sempione state road 33, state road 233 Varesina, from state road 527 Bustese, and from the Domodossola-Milan, Luino-Gallarate and Gallarate-Varese railway lines (operated by Rete Ferroviaria Italiana) and the Saronno-Novara line with its Sacconago-Malpensa Aeroporto branch line (operated by Ferrovienord).

The territory, which features waterways and a temperate climate, was the scene of the development of settlements since ancient times. During the Early Middle Ages, the Alto Milanese was divided between the counties of Seprio (with the capital Castelseprio) and Burgaria (probably linked to Parabiago), two counties dependent on the march of Lombardy; between the 13th and 15th centuries, with the dissolution and disappearance of the two counties, the Alto Milanese began to distinguish itself as an area of influence of Busto Arsizio, Legnano and Gallarate. In the Late Middle Ages the Alto Milanese was the scene of the Battle of Legnano and the Battle of Parabiago. The Alto Milanese is home to the western Lombard dialect, a local variant of the Lombard language, a Romance language derived from Latin having Celtic substratum and Lombardic superstratum.

Noteworthy among the events organized in the Alto Milanese are the Palio di Legnano and the Busto Arsizio Film Festival. The Palio di Legnano is a traditional festival that has been held annually in Legnano since 1935 to commemorate the battle of the same name where a historical parade and a horse race among Legnano's eight historic contrade (districts) find their place, closing the event. The Busto Arsizio Film Festival is a film festival of national importance whose goals are to promote high-quality Italian productions. Sports competitions held in the Alto Milanese include the Campaccio and Cinque Mulini cross-country races (both included in the World Athletics Cross Country Permit international circuit), the Coppa Bernocchi bicycle race, which is part of the Trittico Lombardo, and the San Giorgio su Legnano chess tournament. The Alto Milanese was home to the 2006 European Cross Country Championships and the 2012 European Fencing Championships, with the former being held in San Giorgio su Legnano and the latter in Legnano. Originating in the Alto Milanese area are bruscitti, a main course made from finely chopped beef cooked long.

== Physical geography ==
=== Territory ===
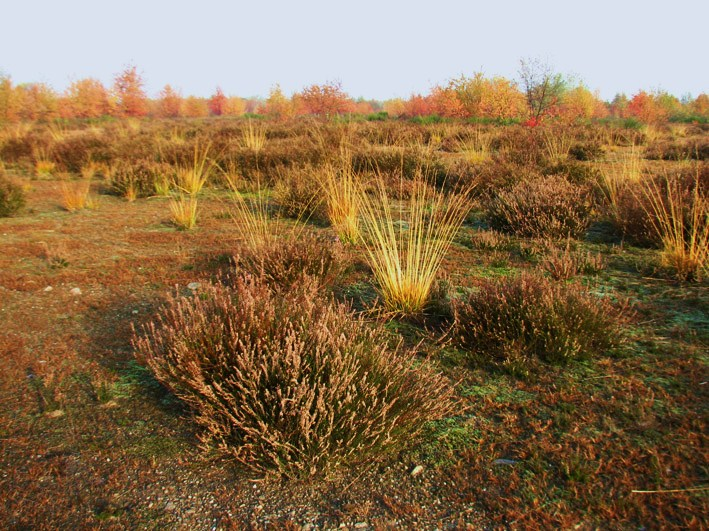
The heathland near Cascina Malpensa during the autumn bloom of the heather. The Milan Malpensa Airport was named after this Lombard courtyard.

The territory of the Alto Milanese can be geographically divided into two zones. The north-central zone is hilly, with some valleys, such as the Olona Valley and the Arno Valley. The southern zone, on the other hand, includes the upper Po Valley. The soil, which is mainly composed of pebbles, gravel, sand and clay, was once covered by a thin layer of humus unsuitable for forest growth and agricultural cultivation, resulting in it being largely heathland.

Over the centuries, due to the fertilization work done by local farmers and the construction of artificial canals, the territory of Alto Milanese has been made cultivable. Until the 19th century, the landscape included heathland and the cultivation of vines and cereals, while at present there is little differentiated agricultural activity, with maize being the main crop.

According to seismic classification, the Alto Milanese is in zone 4 (irrelevant seismicity), as established by PCM Ordinance No. 3274 of March 20, 2003.

=== Hydrography ===
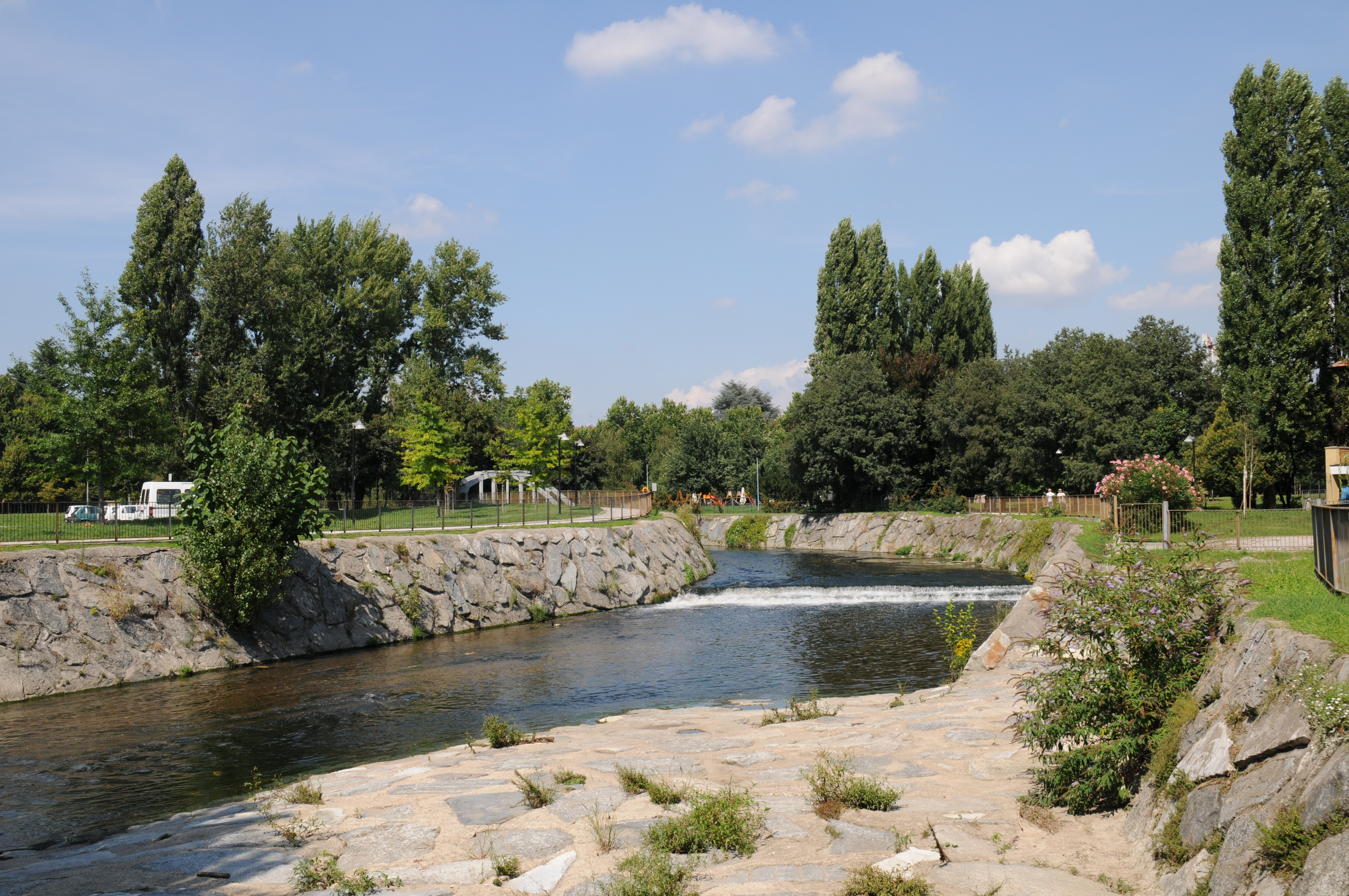
The Olona River in Legnano

In the north, Lake Maggiore (Sesto Calende and Angera), Lake Comabbio, and Lake Monate are part of the Alto Milanese. The major rivers are the Olona and the Ticino. There are numerous streams, including the Arno, Tenore, Bozzente, Lura, Rile, and Strona. The Olona River has led to considerable urban and industrial development along its course: numerous manufacturing activities have flourished on its banks, particularly textile, mechanical, and chemical industries, which originally exploited its waters to power machinery. As a result of this development, which is predominantly autonomous from that of the remaining part of the Milan metropolitan area, the Alto Milanese is one of the most industrialized and urbanized in Milan's northern hinterland.

The main watercourses in the Bustese, one of the territories of the Alto Milanese, are the Olona River and its tributaries Rile and Tenore. Minor watercourses are the Fontanile di Tradate, the Riale delle Selve, the Mornaga, the Valdessera, the Selvagna, the Marubbio, the Riale di Torba and the Bozzone. In the Bustese area, there are no major bodies of water, while there are numerous ponds fed by the various rivulets and some resurgences, of which the major ones are Stagno Boza, Stagno di Torba, and Laghetto Madonnetta. In Gallaratese, however, the waterways are the Ticino and its tributaries Arno and Strona. In the Legnanese area flows the Olona, while the Saronnese is crossed by the Lura stream, which originates in the territory of the municipality of Bizzarone and flows into the Olona. Also noteworthy are artificial canals, such as the Villoresi Canal and the Naviglio Grande, both of which cross the Alto Milanese.

=== Climate ===
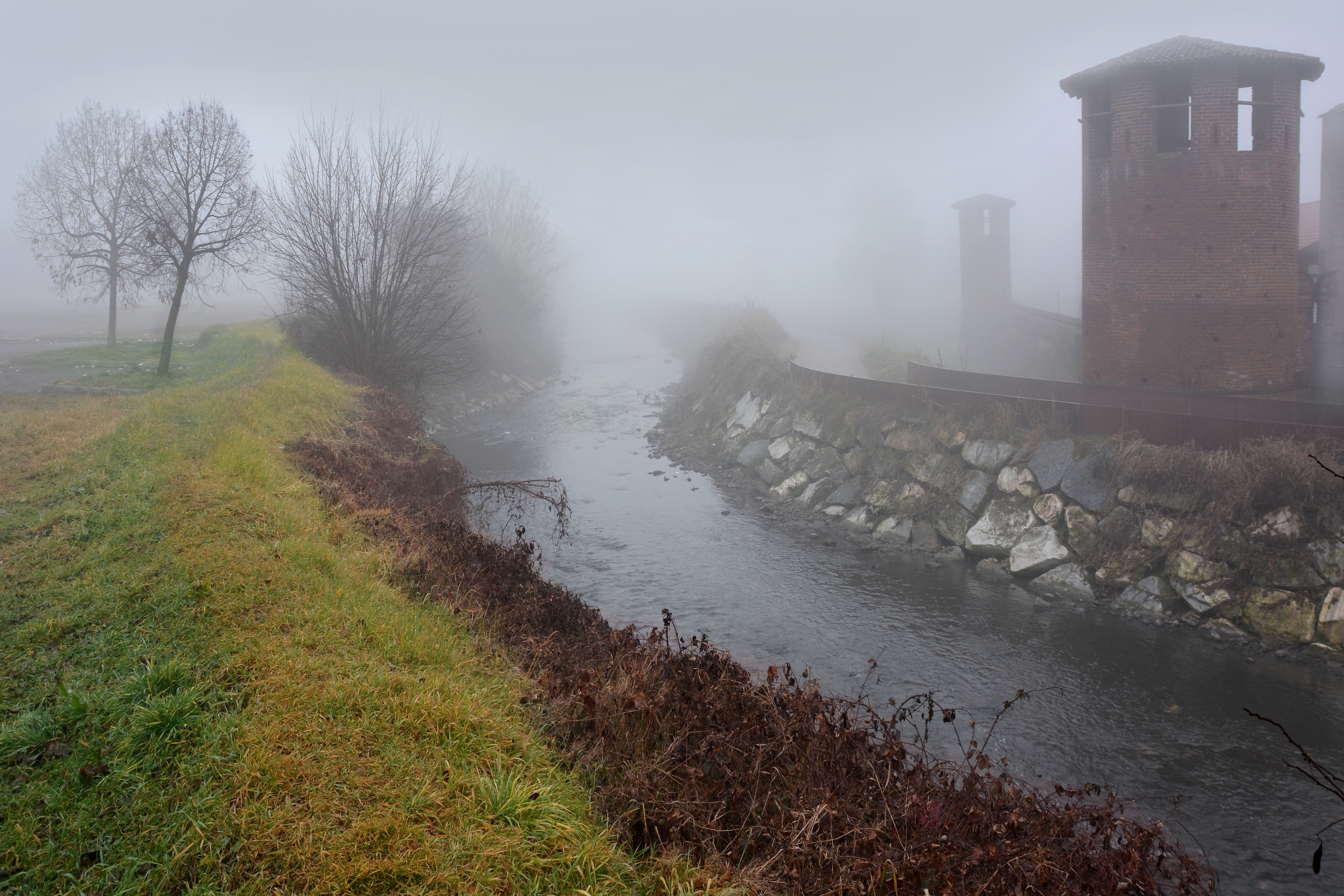
Fog at Legnano's Visconti Castle

The climate of the Alto Milanese is characterized by a wide annual temperature range, with low minimum temperatures in winter (-4/-6 °C, even with peaks as low as -7/-10 °C) and high maximum temperatures in summer (30-32 °C, sometimes with peaks of 35 °C). Rainfall is mainly in the spring and autumn months, although thunderstorms are frequent in hot and humid summers.

The characteristic "basin" shape of the Po Valley means that there is a considerable stagnation of air both in winter and in summer, with different effects in the two seasons: in winter, when there is an accumulation of cold and a lack of wind, a marked thermal inversion is formed, which can last for several days, especially on humid and foggy days, causing very cold days and intense frost, while in summer it causes violent thunderstorms.

Data from the Milan Malpensa weather station, based on the World Meteorological Organization's 30-year reference average (1961-1990), show that the minimum temperature in the coldest month, January, is around −4 °C, while the maximum temperature in the hottest month, July, is around 28°C. The average annual rainfall is over 1,000 mm and peaks in spring and fall, with a relative minimum in winter.

== History ==
=== Prehistory ===
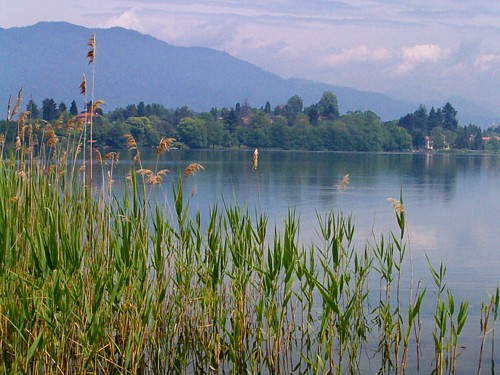
Shore of Lake Monate, where pile-dwelling settlements have been found.

The Alto Milanese area, which features waterways and a temperate climate, was the scene of the development of settlements since prehistoric times. In Cadrezzate and on the areas along the shores of Lake Monate, pile-dwelling settlements have been found at Il Sabbione, and in 2011 they were included in the UNESCO World Heritage List along with other ancient settlements in the Alps from prehistoric times.

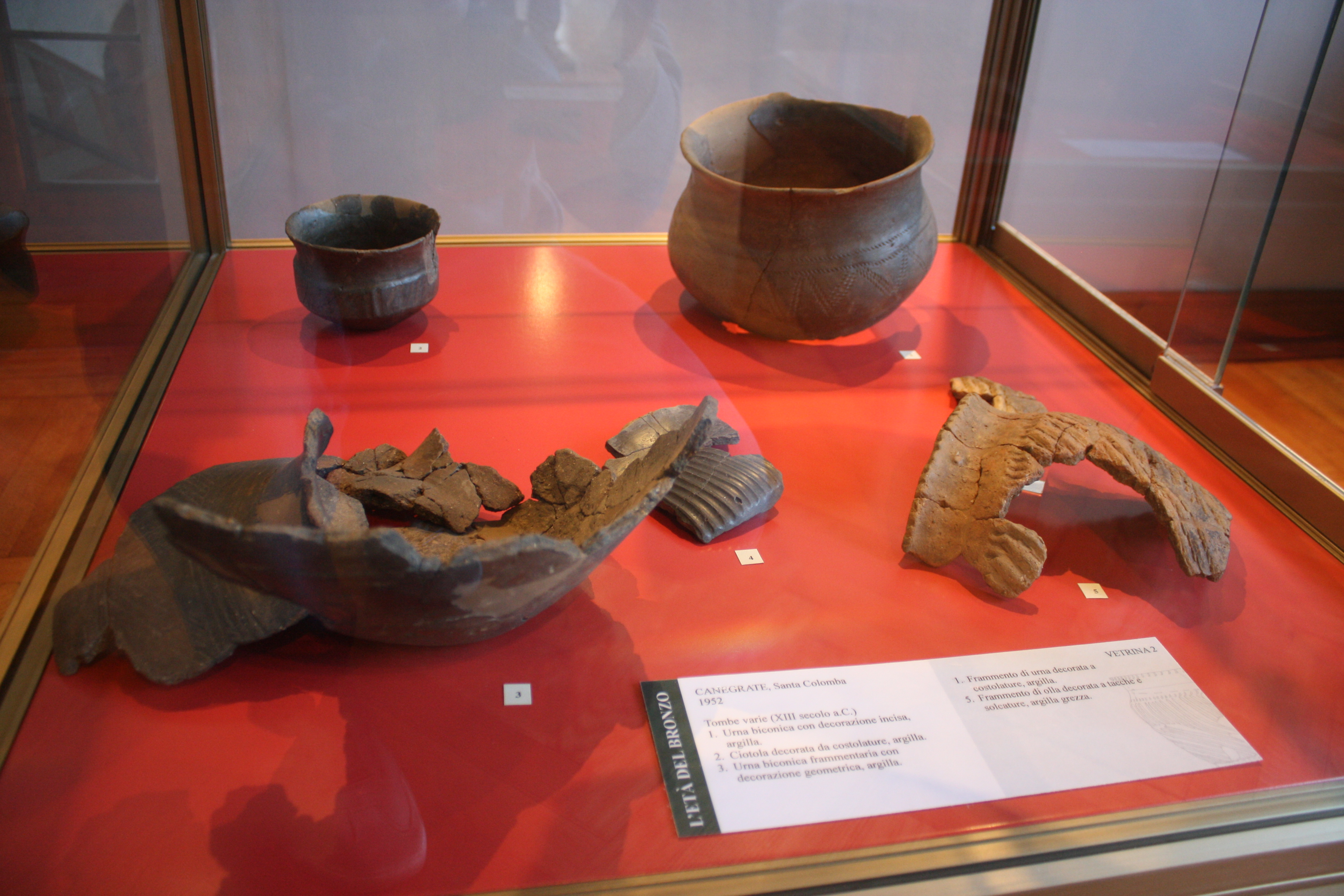
Items of Canegrate culture preserved at the Guido Sutermeister Civic Museum in Legnano

These populations, according to scholars' hypotheses, then migrated south through the Alto Milanese following a strong population increase. From the archaeological finds, it can be inferred that the Olona Valley was - already in prehistoric times - a relevant communication route.

Of later date was the development of the Canegrate culture first (from the 13th century B.C. onward) and the Golasecca culture later (between the 9th and 4th centuries B.C.), whose names derive from the respective localities where the first excavations were carried out, which led to the discovery of these prehistoric cultures.

In particular, the Canegrate culture was a protohistoric civilization that developed in the Po Valley from the Bronze Age on the territories of western Lombardy, eastern Piedmont, and Ticino. The material evidence found in Canegrate consisted of a necropolis made up of 165 tombs, within which there were metal and ceramic objects. The Canegrate finds consist of a high concentration of burials that has few equals in northern Italy.

The Golasecca culture is an early Iron Age culture consisting of fifty tombs with pottery and metal objects. The material evidence is found scattered over a wide territory of 20,000 km^{2} south of the Alps, including the Po, Serio and Sesia rivers bounded on the north by the Alpine passes. The greatest density of finds has been in the subalpine hill belt, with a continuity of about a millennium, and this is the area that has seen the development of the two epicenters of the culture itself, which are the Sesto Calende-Golasecca-Castelletto Ticino areas and the area around Como.

=== Pre-Roman populations ===
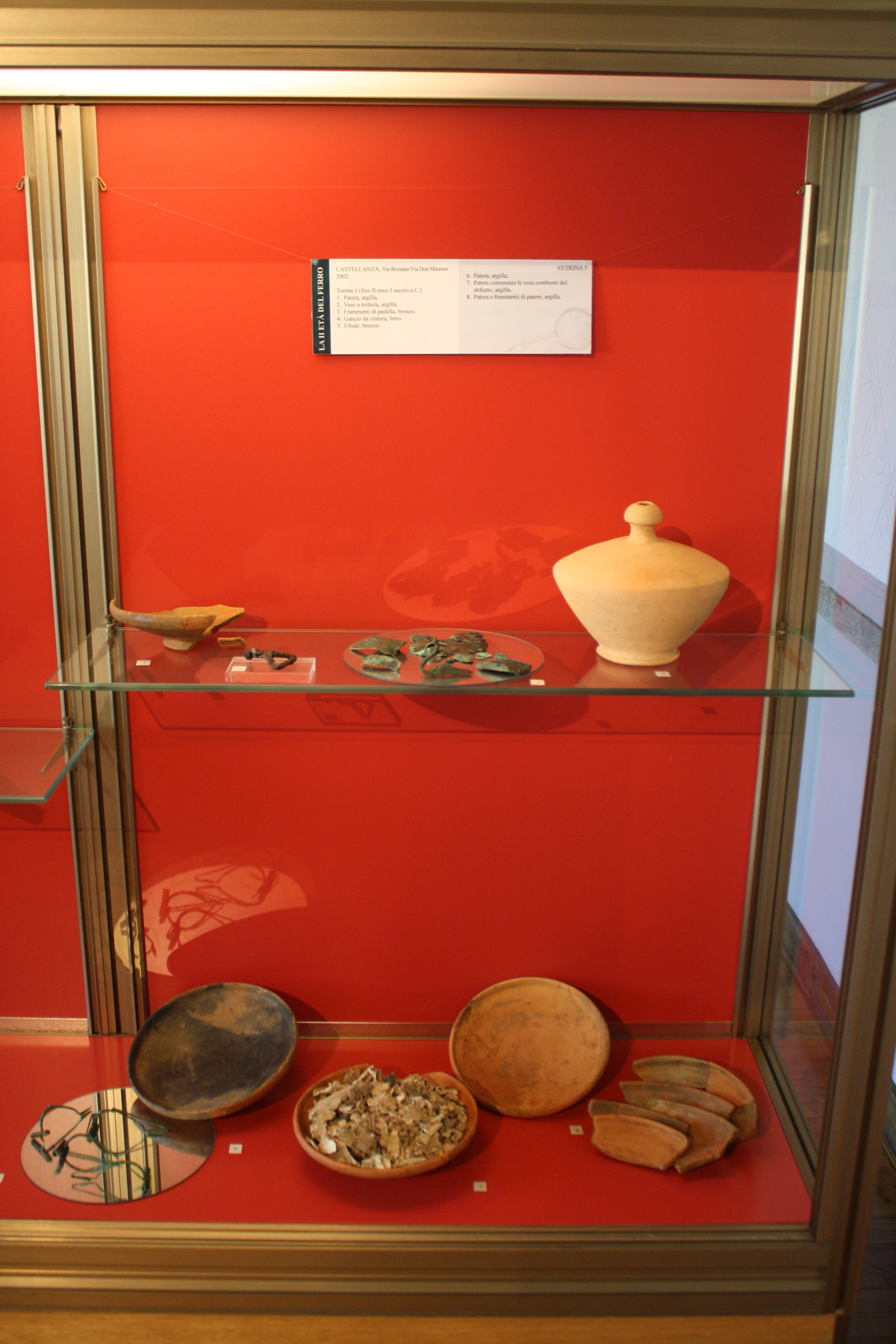
Finds from the Roman period (late 2nd-early 1st century B.C.), from the time of the Roman conquest of Cisalpine Gaul, still marked by Celtic influence. They were found in Castellanza in 2002 and are kept in the Guido Sutermeister Civic Museum in Legnano.

In a series of excavation campaigns carried out in the Alto Milanese, artifacts dating back to the settlement in the Po Valley of the Celts were discovered, which can be dated between the 4th and 1st centuries B.C. and are related to the La Tène culture. Finds related to the Etruscans and the Veneti have also been found in the Alto Milanese with excavations in Vergiate and Sesto Calende, respectively.

Archaeological finds from the historical period immediately following the Roman conquest of the Po Valley continued to be characterized by marked Celtic features, which gradually faded until they disappeared in the Augustan Age, that is, until the Romanization of the Alto Milanese was completed.

=== Roman era ===
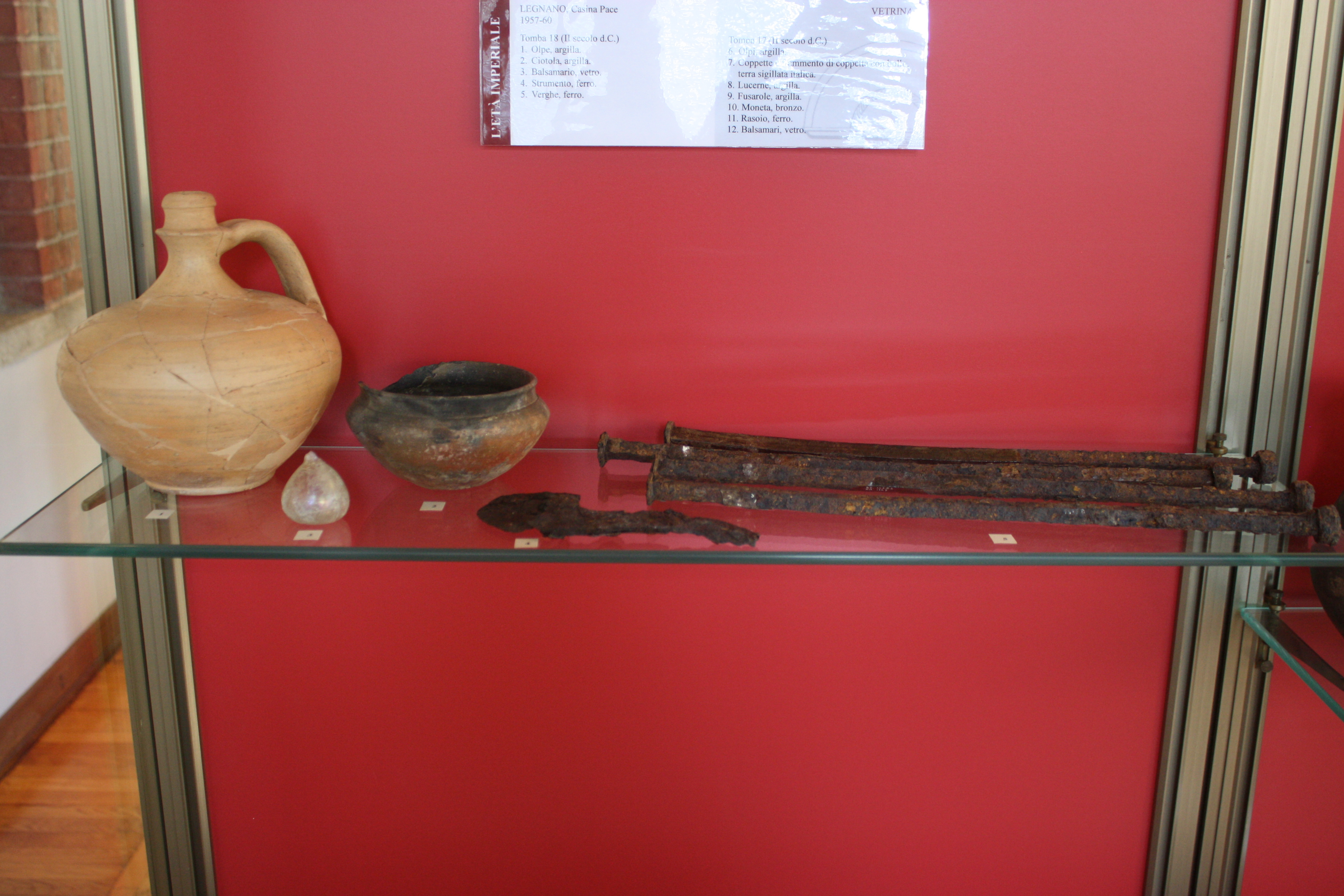
Roman artifacts (2nd century A.D.) discovered at Casina Pace in Legnano between 1957 and 1960. They include a clay olpe, a clay bowl, a glass unguentarium, an iron instrument and iron rods. They are kept in the Guido Sutermeister Civic Museum in Legnano.

The ancient Romans did not pursue forced assimilation of conquered populations, but allowed the inhabitants of the Alto Milanese to continue to profess their religion, use their language, and maintain their traditions. The Romanization of the area thus took place in stages. The fusion of the two cultures is evidenced by the artifacts attributable to the Augustan Age, which gradually lost the characteristics associated with Celtic civilization and assumed those typical of Roman culture.

In Roman imperial times the inhabitants of the Alto Milanese were organized administratively into vicus, communities that later gave rise to many of the modern municipalities. From the few viable rural settlements of the republican era, there was a shift in the imperial era to a more numerous and organized community with an urban fabric consisting of small isolated settlements in the countryside that revolved around the larger rural center. These rural communities had good agricultural productivity. With the crisis and then the fall of the Western Roman Empire, the Alto Milanese also experienced a phase of social and economic decline.

In Roman times the Alto Milanese was traversed by two important Roman roads, the Via Mediolanum-Bilitio and the Via Mediolanum-Verbannus. The Via Mediolanum-Bilitio connected Mediolanum (modern Milan) with Bilitio (Bellinzona) or perhaps even Curia Raetorum (Chur) via Varisium (Varese) and, only hypothetically, Luganum (Lugano). This road, beyond Bellinzona, via Mons Vaium (San Bernardino Pass) or Lukmanier, led to Chur and connected to other trade routes directed to Rhaetia and beyond the Alps.

On the other hand, the Mediolanum-Verbannus road connected Mediolanum (modern Milan) with the Verbannus Lacus (Lake Verbano, i.e. Lake Maggiore and then with the Simplon Pass, through which the Alps could be crossed). According to a nineteenth-century theory it was extended by Emperor Septimius Severus. This road, aimed at land transport, was supplemented by water routes, the main axis of which was the Olona River. Transportation along this route was therefore both by land and by water. A large part of the route of the Via Mediolanum-Verbannus, which was also used in the Middle Ages and in the following centuries, was taken up by Napoleon to build the Simplon highway.

=== Middle Ages ===
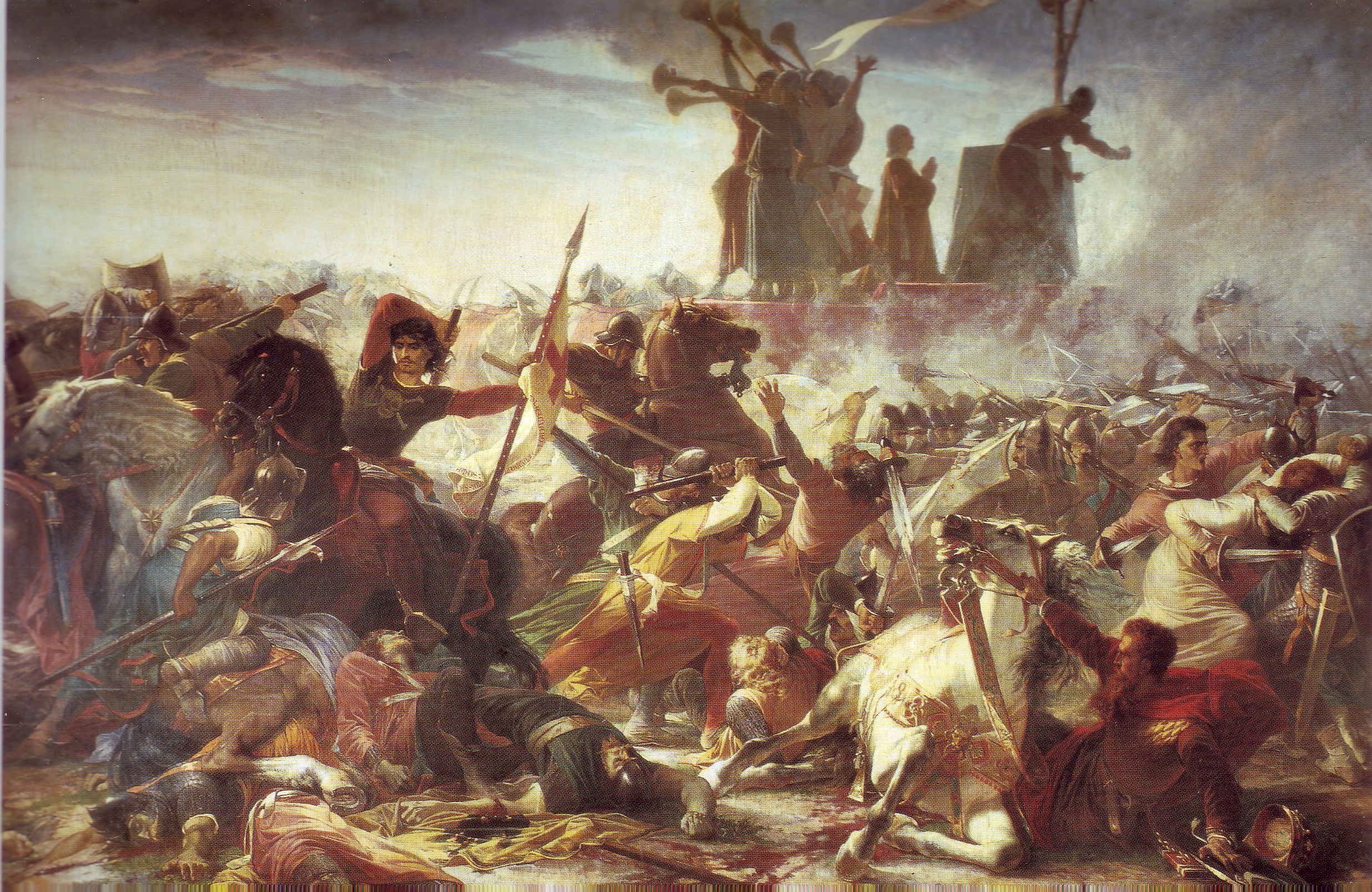
The Battle of Legnano by Amos Cassioli (1860), a painting kept in the Gallery of Modern Art in the Pitti Palace in Florence

During the early Middle Ages, the Alto Milanese was divided between the counties of Seprio (with the capital Castelseprio) and Burgaria (probably linked to Parabiago), two counties dependent on the March of Lombardy; between the 13th and 15th centuries, with the dissolution and disappearance of the two counties, the Alto Milanese began to distinguish itself as an area of influence of Busto Arsizio, Legnano and Gallarate.

In the Late Middle Ages the Alto Milanese was the scene of the Battle of Legnano, fought between Frederick Barbarossa's imperial army and the troops of the Lombard League on May 29, 1176 between the towns of Legnano and Borsano. The clash was crucial in the long war waged by the Holy Roman Empire in an attempt to assert its power over the communes of northern Italy, who decided to put aside mutual rivalries by allying themselves in a military union symbolically led by Pope Alexander III, the Lombard League.

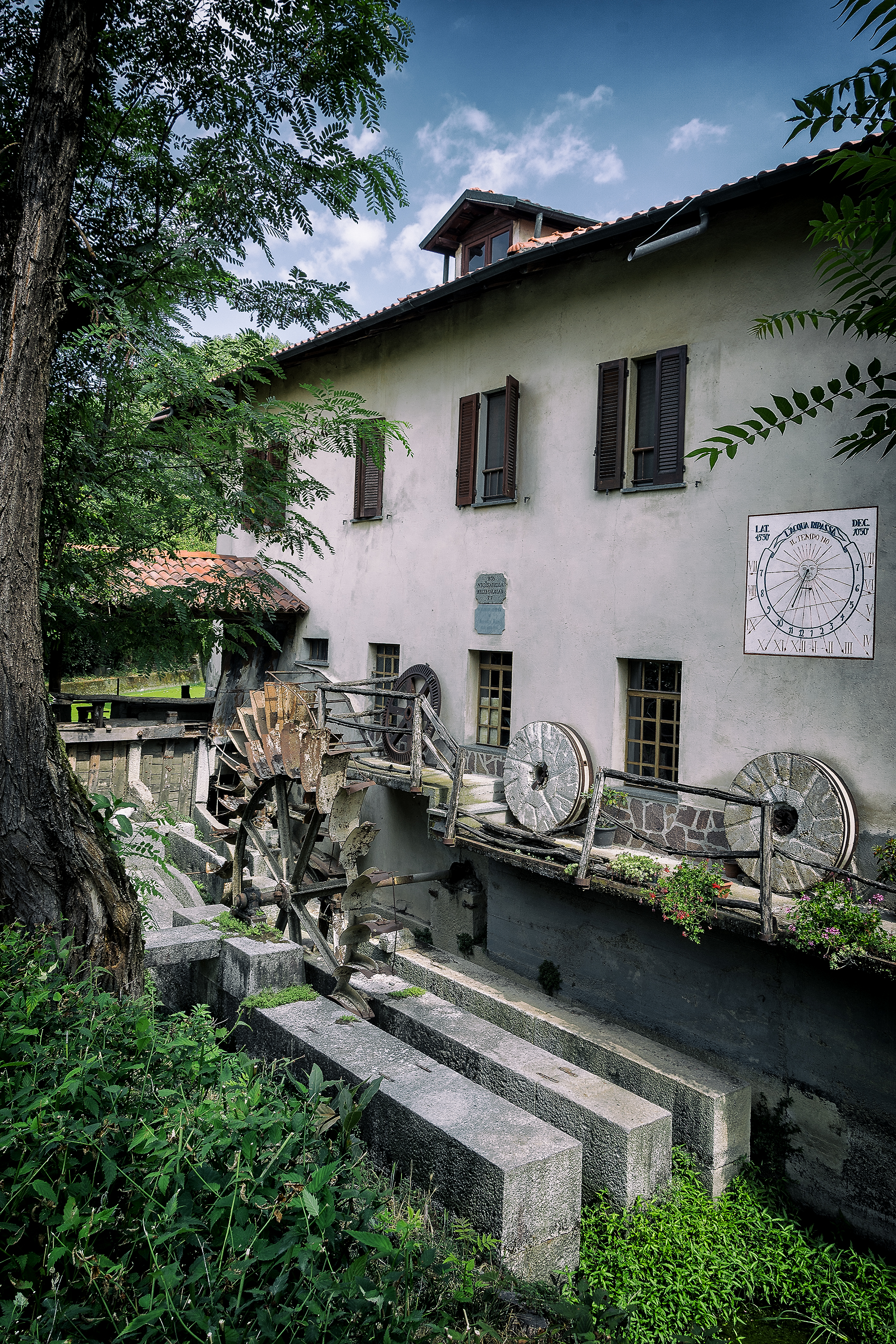
Glimpse of the Meraviglia mill in San Vittore Olona, one of the watermills on the Olona River

The battle ended the fifth and final descent into Italy of Emperor Frederick Barbarossa, who after the defeat at Legnano tried to resolve the Italian question by attempting the diplomatic approach. This resulted a few years later in the Peace of Constance (June 25, 1183), by which the emperor recognized the Lombard League by giving administrative, political and judicial concessions to the communes and officially ending his attempt to hegemonize northern Italy.

The battle is referred to in Goffredo Mameli and Michele Novaro's Canto degli Italiani, which reads, “[...] From the Alps to Sicily, Legnano is everywhere [...]” in remembrance of the victory of Italian populations over foreign ones. Due to this clash, Legnano is the only city, besides Rome, to be mentioned in the Italian national anthem. In Legnano, to commemorate the battle, the Palio has been held annually since 1935 on the last Sunday in May. In the institutional sphere, the date of May 29 has been chosen as the regional holiday of Lombardy.

The Alto Milanese was also the scene of the Battle of Parabiago, a clash that occurred on February 21, 1339, in the countryside around Parabiago and Nerviano, between the Milanese troops of Azzone Visconti, led by Luchino Visconti, against the rebels of the Compagnia di San Giorgio led by Lodrisio Visconti, claimants to the title of Lord of Milan; this clash ended in Azzone Visconti's victory.

Starting in the Middle Ages, the presence of water from the Olona River led to the construction of mills along the river. The mills were used to grind grain, but also to operate the craftsmen's machinery such as saws, hammers, etc. As a result, milling became an important source of income that was juxtaposed with more traditional agricultural activities such as growing wheat and vines. The oldest writing that has come down to us in which a milling plant on the Olona River is mentioned is from 1043; this mill, which was owned by Pietro Vismara, was located between Castegnate and Gabinella in Legnano.

=== Modern era ===
The main activity on which the economy of the Alto Milanese in the 16th century was based was agriculture. The peasants of the Alto Milanese mainly cultivated cereals (millet and wheat), vines and mulberry trees, which formed the basis of silkworm breeding. In particular, the history of viticulture in the Alto Milanese had its roots in the Roman imperial era. Alto Milanese was also ravaged by the plague epidemic of 1630, a pandemic also recounted by Alessandro Manzoni in The Betrothed, which decimated the population.

Industrialization in the Alto Milanese occurred in the first decades of the 19th century. What was influential in the genesis of this process was the tradition of handicrafts and that of domestic manufacturing that had been present in the productive fabric of the area for a few centuries; these activities were practiced to supplement work in the fields.

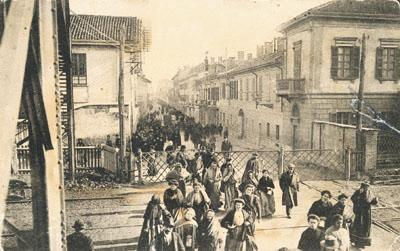
Workers exit at the intersection of Via XX Settembre and the Mediterranean railway (now Viale della Gloria) in Busto Arsizio

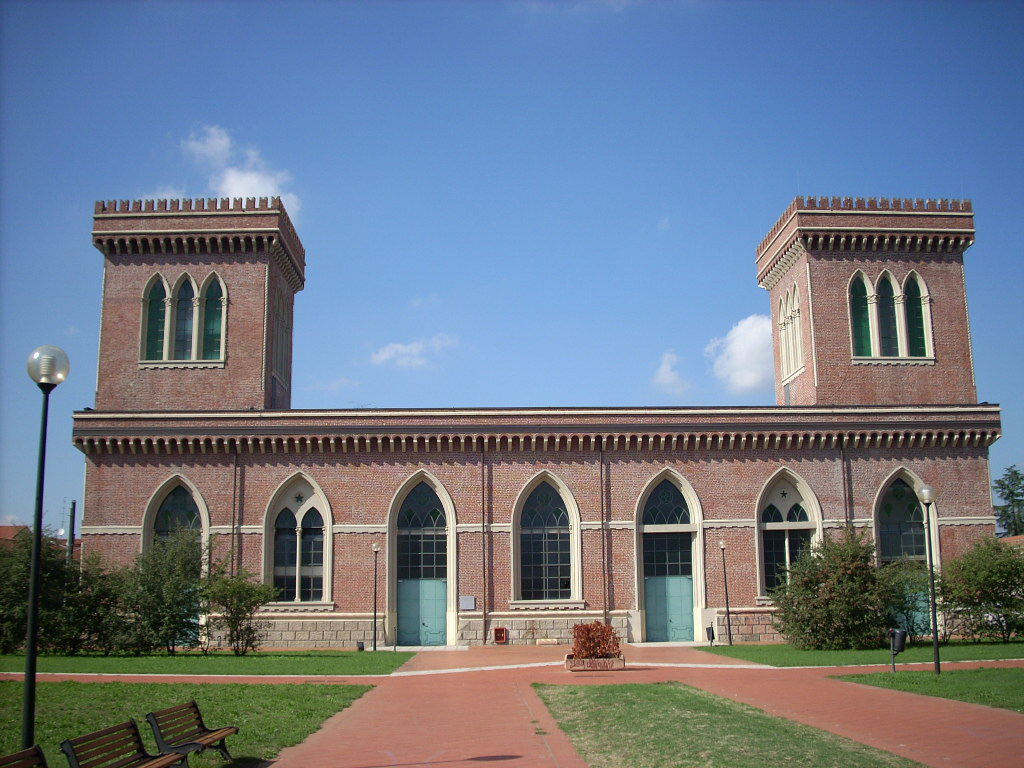
Museum of Textiles and Industry of Busto Arsizio

The process of industrialization that led to the gradual transformation of the Alto Milanese economy was accelerated by two natural disasters that threw local agriculture into crisis: cryptogamy, a disease that affected vines, and pébrine, an epidemic that damaged silkworm cocoons. For the first infection, which appeared between 1851 and 1852, the result in Lombardy was a rapid fall in the amount of wine produced: the number of hectoliters of wine production decreased from 1,520,000 in 1838 to 550,000 in 1852. Two other vine diseases, plasmopara viticola and phylloxera, which occurred between 1879 and 1890, were the final blow to wine production.

As a result of these epidemics, wine cultivation in the Alto Milanese disappeared for good, and farmers concentrated their efforts on grain production and silkworm breeding. Before the disappearance of vines in Legnano, the Colli di Sant'Erasmo wine, which was produced in the district of the same name, was famous; the last fields of the Colli di Sant'Erasmo in Legnano cultivated with vines were eliminated in 1987 to allow the construction, between Colli di Sant'Erasmo Street, Canazza Street and Trivulzio Street, of a parking lot to serve the Legnano Civil Hospital.

Shortly after the spread of the vine disease, an infection of the silkworm, pébrine, appeared. In addition to this problem, in the latter part of the 19th century, Europe was hit by an agricultural crisis involving cereal crops: this was due to the spread on the markets of competitively priced American grains. Vast areas of the American Midwest had been earmarked for cultivation, while technological advances had drastically reduced the cost of ocean transportation. The effect was a profound crisis that affected grain crops in Europe; this conjuncture peaked in the 1880s and characterized Old World agriculture until the early 20th century. This event gave a further push toward the industrialization of the Alto Milanese, as it also put into crisis the most important sector of agriculture in the area after the disappearance of vineyards and the crisis of silkworm breeding: cereal cultivation.

The first phase of industrialization in the Alto Milanese, which took place in the early part of the 19th century and was characterized by a pre-capitalist production system, was later followed by a modernization of production processes. This initiated, in the second half of the century, the second phase of the industrial revolution in the Alto Milanese, which led to the establishment of real textile and mechanical factories in the modern sense of the term. The first capitalist activities to gradually emerge were the spinning mills, which grew out of the proto-industrial activities that had emerged in the first decades of the 19th century; some of them grew considerably to become the most important cotton mills in Lombardy.

In 1878, the first Italian customs tariff led to a certain protectionism, especially with regard to yarns and textiles in common use: this put the Italian cotton industry in a better position to withstand competition from the English cotton industry. This led to the great expansion achieved by the Italian textile industry, which peaked from 1890 to 1906. The machines used in the textile industry, which were increasingly efficient and therefore complex, meant that there was a need for maintenance equipment. In addition there was a need for quick repairs. As a result, the last decades of the 19th century saw the birth of the first mechanical industries in the Alto Milanese, which built and repaired textile machinery; later, more extensive production was added to the mechanical field.

Industrial development led to a new agricultural crisis in the area: many farmers began to work in factories, abandoning agriculture. The ratio of people employed in industry, compared to the total number of workers, in Legnano, for example, rose from 12 percent in 1857, to 28 percent in 1887 to 42 percent in 1911: at the end of the process of transformation of the agricultural village into a modern industrial city, Legnano began to be nicknamed the "little Manchester" of Italy, a title disputed in the area with the neighboring and equally industrialized Busto Arsizio. The pace and scope of this transformation had few other comparable examples on the European continent. At the turn of the century there was also a strong commercial development. Infrastructure for the transportation of people and goods was very important for this expansion. In 1880 the Milan-Gallarate tramway was also built, which was discontinued in the second half of the 20th century.

=== Contemporary era ===
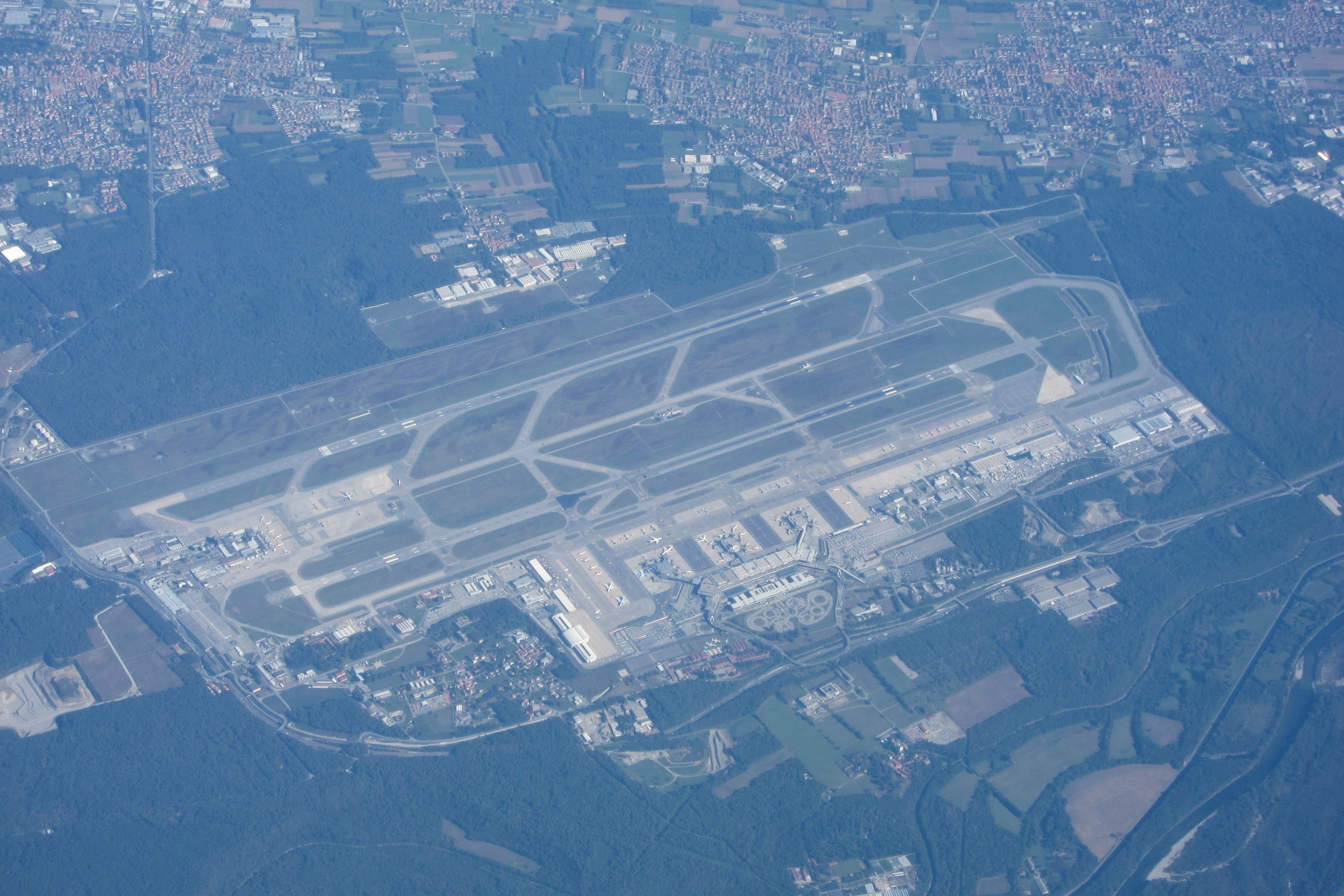
Milan Malpensa Airport

After World War II, the Alto Milanese was hit, like the rest of Italy, by the severe economic recession that followed the conflict. Basic foodstuffs were insufficient, public transportation was failing, and roads were bad. As Italian politics also stabilized, the economic system of the Alto Milanese began to develop again, returning to the growth rate of the pre-World War II period partly due to the Marshall Plan. During Italy's strong economic growth during the economic boom, Legnano reached between 1951 and 1961 the second highest rate – nationally – of employees in industry in relation to inhabitants (65.2 percent), second only to Sesto San Giovanni (67.14 percent).

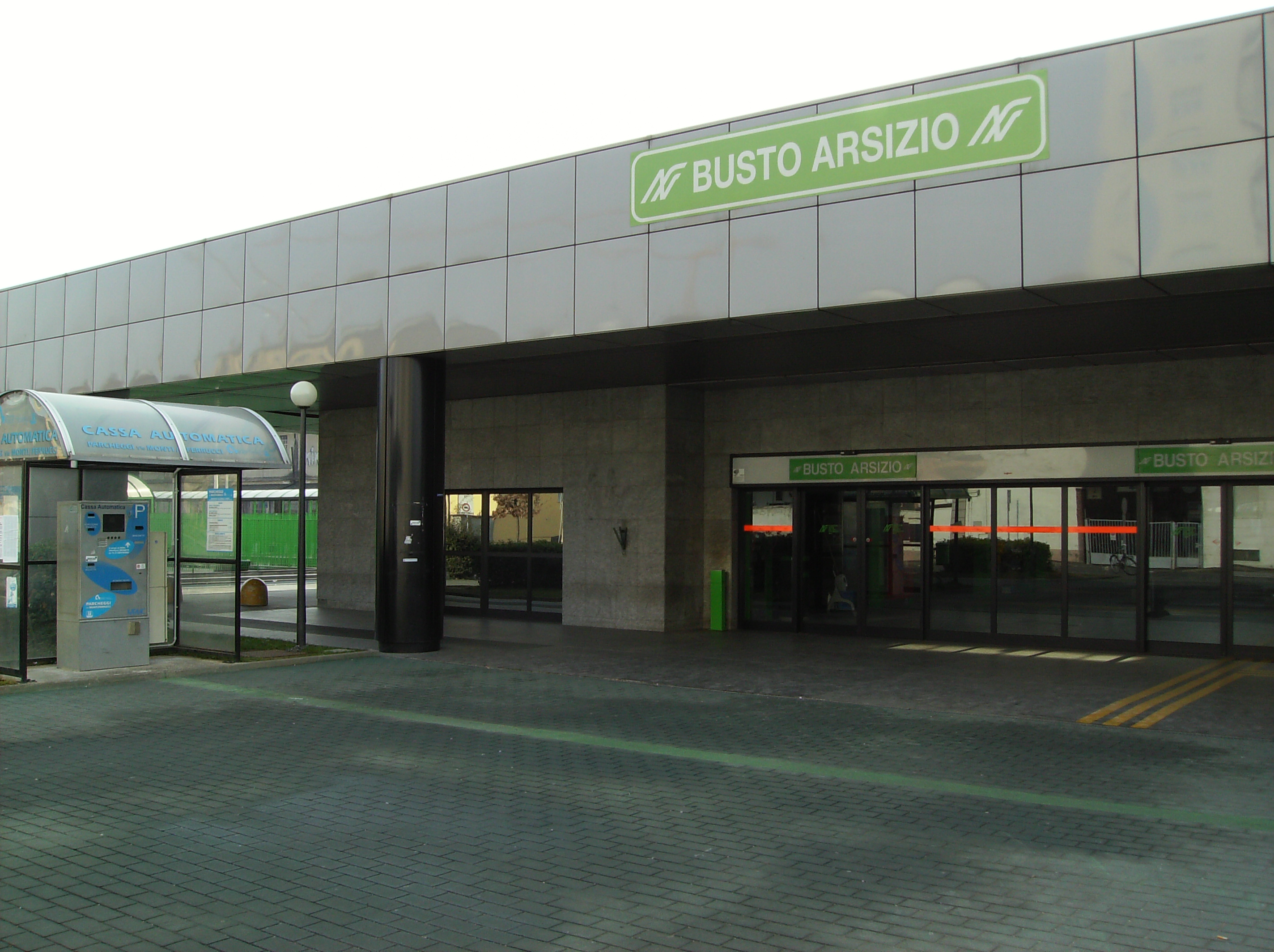
Busto Arsizio Nord railway station

In the early 1970s, the Alto Milanese was the protagonist of the rise and flourishing of the first instances of commercial television. Enzo Tortora and Renzo Villa had the intuition to bring to television the forms of theatrical performances typical of the small theaters of oratories in the area. From an economic point of view, advertising revenue was favored by the entrepreneurial and commercial fabric of the area, based on small and medium enterprises, with the first examples of large-scale distribution. Thus, Telealtomilanese and Antennatre were created, with studios in Busto Arsizio and Legnano respectively. In the region, they achieved ratings comparable to those of RAI. After a decade, however, they had to give way to more organized companies, which began to create networks with a national character, such as those of the Fininvest group.

The golden age of industry in the Alto Milanese, which began in the 1880s, ended in the 1960s. Thereafter, the Alto Milanese experienced a long period of crisis that led to the closure of many manufacturing activities. This unfavorable conjuncture was caused by rising labor costs and competition from foreign industrial systems, to which were added the periodic crises that cyclically affect production systems and - in the 1970s - the inconvertibility of the dollar (1971), the oil crisis and the Yom Kippur War (both in 1973). At the same time, a phase of the emergence of small businesses began, which allowed the Alto Milanese to remain embedded in a highly advanced manufacturing environment, still placing it in the 21st century among the most developed and industrialized areas in Italy. Many former industrial areas were then converted to other uses, often with the disappearance of evidence of industrial archaeology.

The economy of the Alto Milanese also veered toward the tertiary sector; in particular, there was strong growth in production services, telecommunications, insurance, transportation, financial management, banking services, and, to a lesser extent, legal and computer services. However, the rate of development of the tertiary sector did not lead to sufficient growth to make up for the disappearance of the large industrial complexes of the past.

== Society and culture ==
=== Languages and dialects ===
The western Lombard dialect is widespread in the Alto Milanese, a local variant of the Lombard language, a Romance language derived from Latin having a Celtic substratum and a Lombardic superstratum. Some scholars have discerned in it traces of the languages of peoples prior to the Latinization of the region, in particular ancient Ligurian, although data on the actual influence of this linguistic substratum are few and of varying interpretation. On the other hand, the linguistic influence that the Celts had on the local dialects of the Alto Milanese was conspicuous, so much so that even today the western Lombard dialect is classified as "Gallo-Italic." However, it was the Roman domination, which supplanted the Celtic one, that shaped the local language spoken in the Alto Milanese, so much so that the lexicon and grammar of this dialect is of Romance derivation. It is spoken by about 30 percent of the population of the area in which it is spread.

Among the local dialects, the Bustocco dialect and the Legnano dialect are notable. The Bustocco dialect (native name Bustocco), which is the variant of Western Lombard spoken in Busto Arsizio (Busti Grandi in Bustocco), is considerably different from both the Milanese dialect, the Varese dialects, and the other dialects spoken in the localities closest to Busto Arsizio, as well as from all other dialects of the Lombard language.

In contrast, the dialect of Legnano (native name legnanés) is spoken around Legnano. Legnano, starting in the 11th century, began to bond with Milan. The village of Legnano, in fact, represented, for those coming from the north, the gateway to the Milanese countryside and thus had an important strategic function for the city of Milan. The link between Legnano and Milan also influenced the Legnano vernacular, which began to differentiate itself from the neighboring Bustocco dialect. Due to the frequent contacts between the two cities, the Milanese dialect began to "contaminate" the language spoken in Legnano. Despite this trend, the Legnano dialect continued to preserve - over the centuries - a conspicuous diversity from the Milanese dialect. The shows of the Italian dialect theater company “I Legnanesi”' are written in Legnano dialect.

=== Institutions, agencies and associations ===
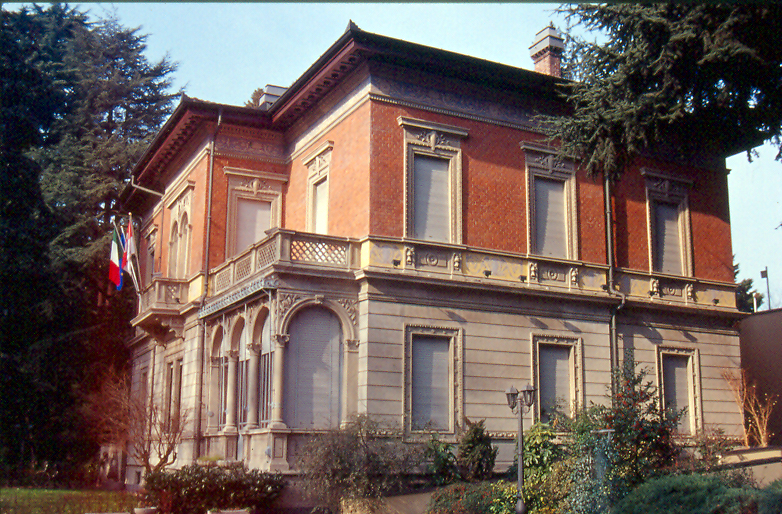
Villa Jucker, headquarters of the Famiglia Legnanese

One of the most important associations in the Alto Milanese is Associazione Consortile dei Comuni dell'Alto Milanese (A.C.C.A.M.). It was founded in 1970 by the municipalities of Busto Arsizio, Gallarate, Legnano, Nerviano and Samarate to design, organize and build waste disposal plants. In 2020, it includes the municipalities of Arsago Seprio, Buscate, Busto Arsizio, Canegrate, Cardano al Campo, Castano Primo, Castellanza, Fagnano Olona, Ferno, Gallarate, Golasecca, Gorla Maggiore, Legnano, Lonate Pozzolo, Magnago, Marnate, Nerviano, Olgiate Olona, Parabiago, Pogliano Milanese, Rescaldina, Samarate, San Giorgio su Legnano, San Vittore Olona, Somma Lombardo, Vanzaghello and Vizzola Ticino.

The Alto Milanese is also home to the Consorzio Sistema Bibliotecario Nord-Ovest, a special consortium company that brings together 33 municipalities in the northwest of the metropolitan city of Milan, which provides various services to the libraries of the aggregated municipalities. The libraries in the consortium make available to users approximately 1.5 million documents (books, music CDs and DVDs) with a total of approximately 500,000 different titles. The system provides about 1.5 million loans per year.

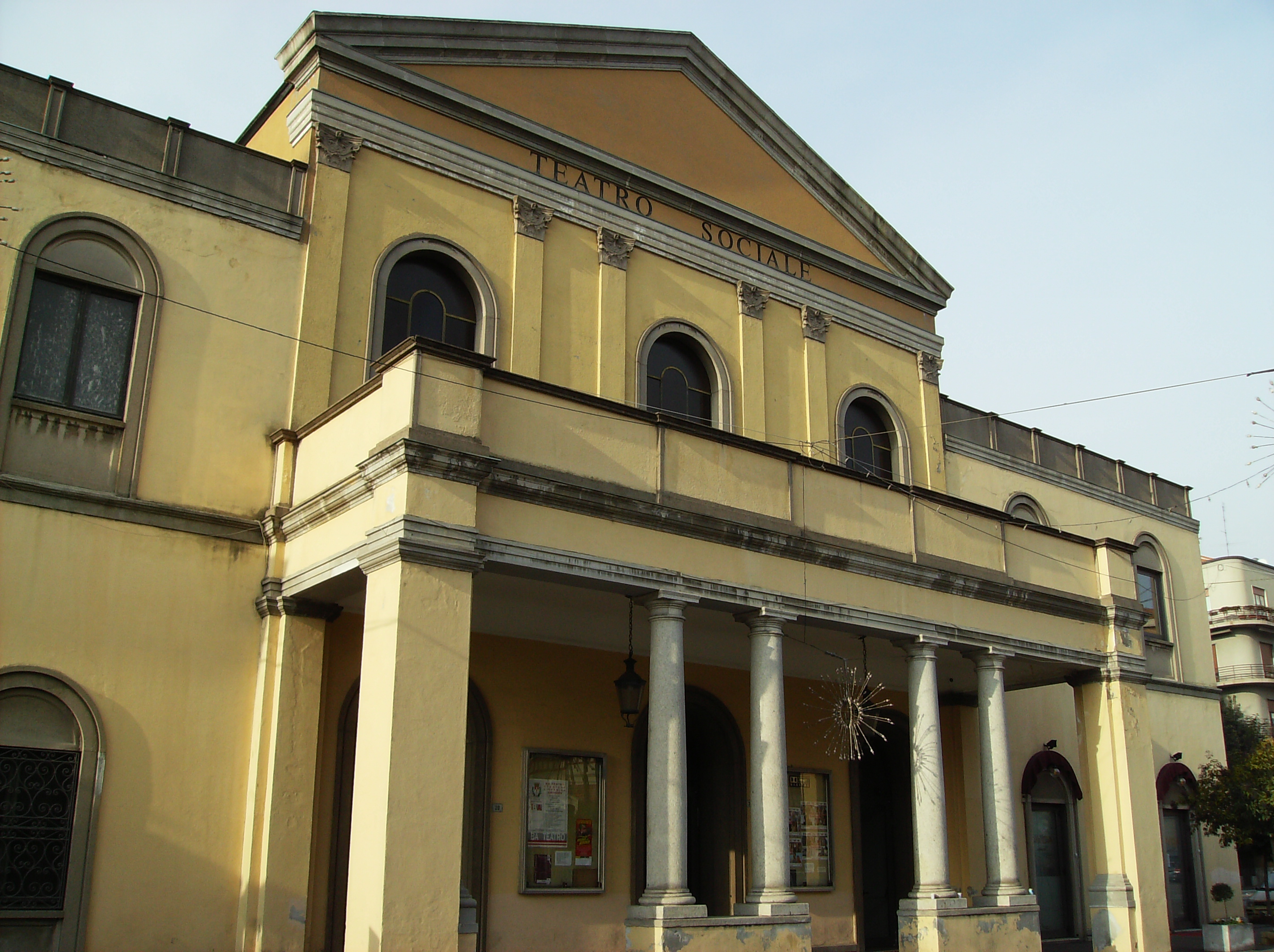
The Social Theater of Busto Arsizio

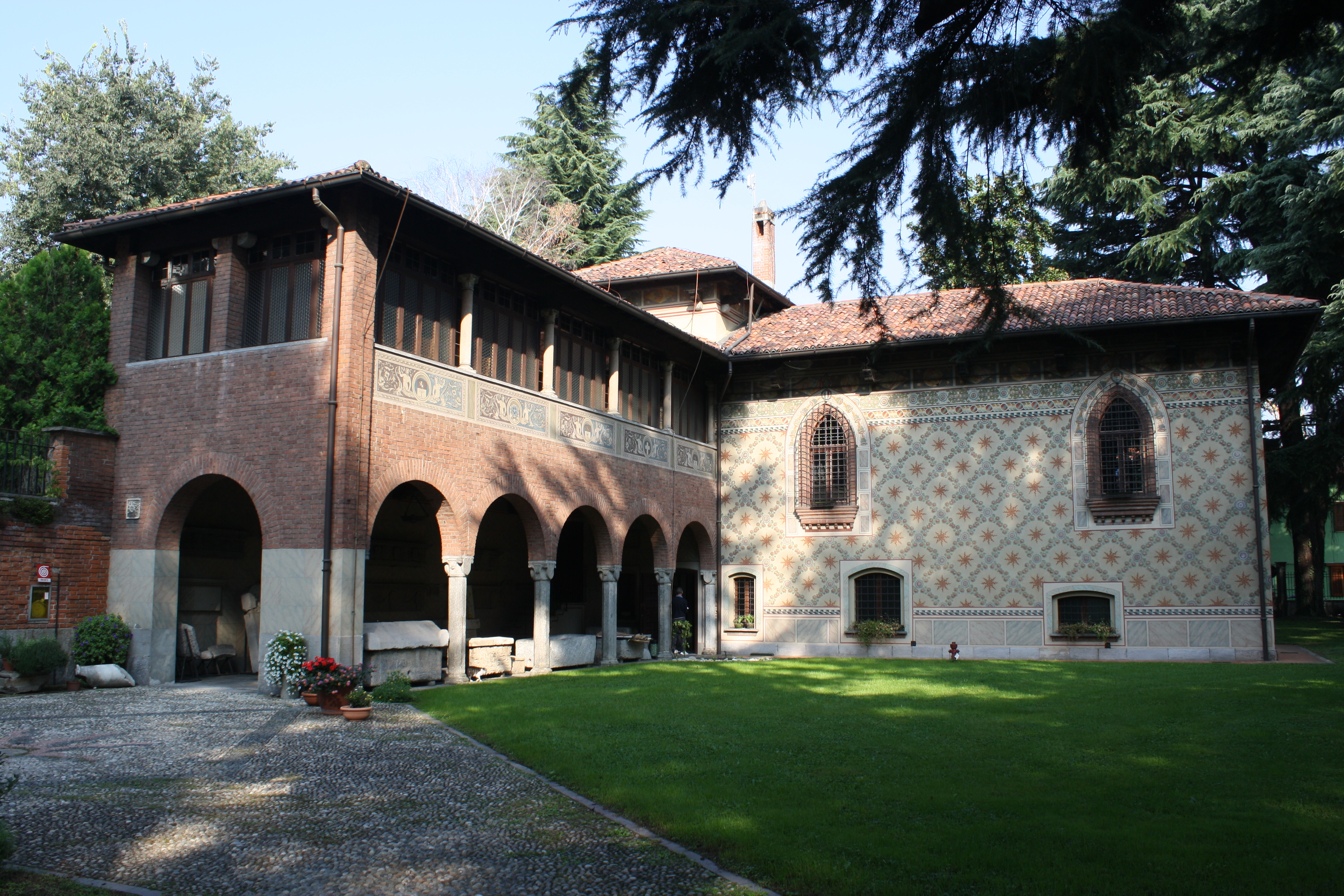
The headquarters of the Sutermeister Civic Museum of Legnano

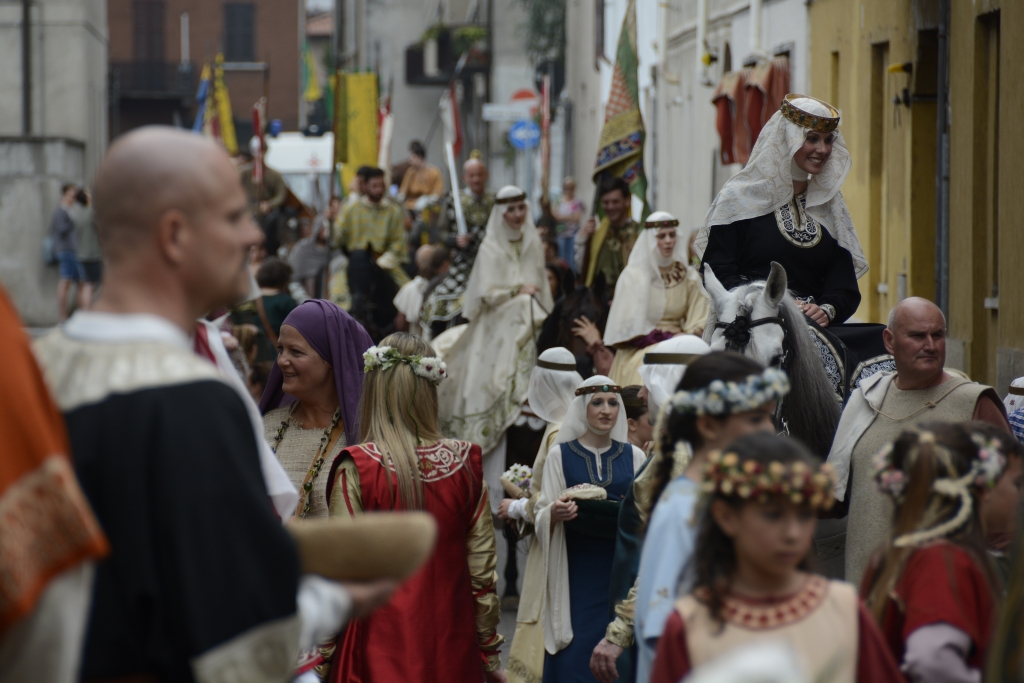
Historical parade of the 2015 Legnano Palio.

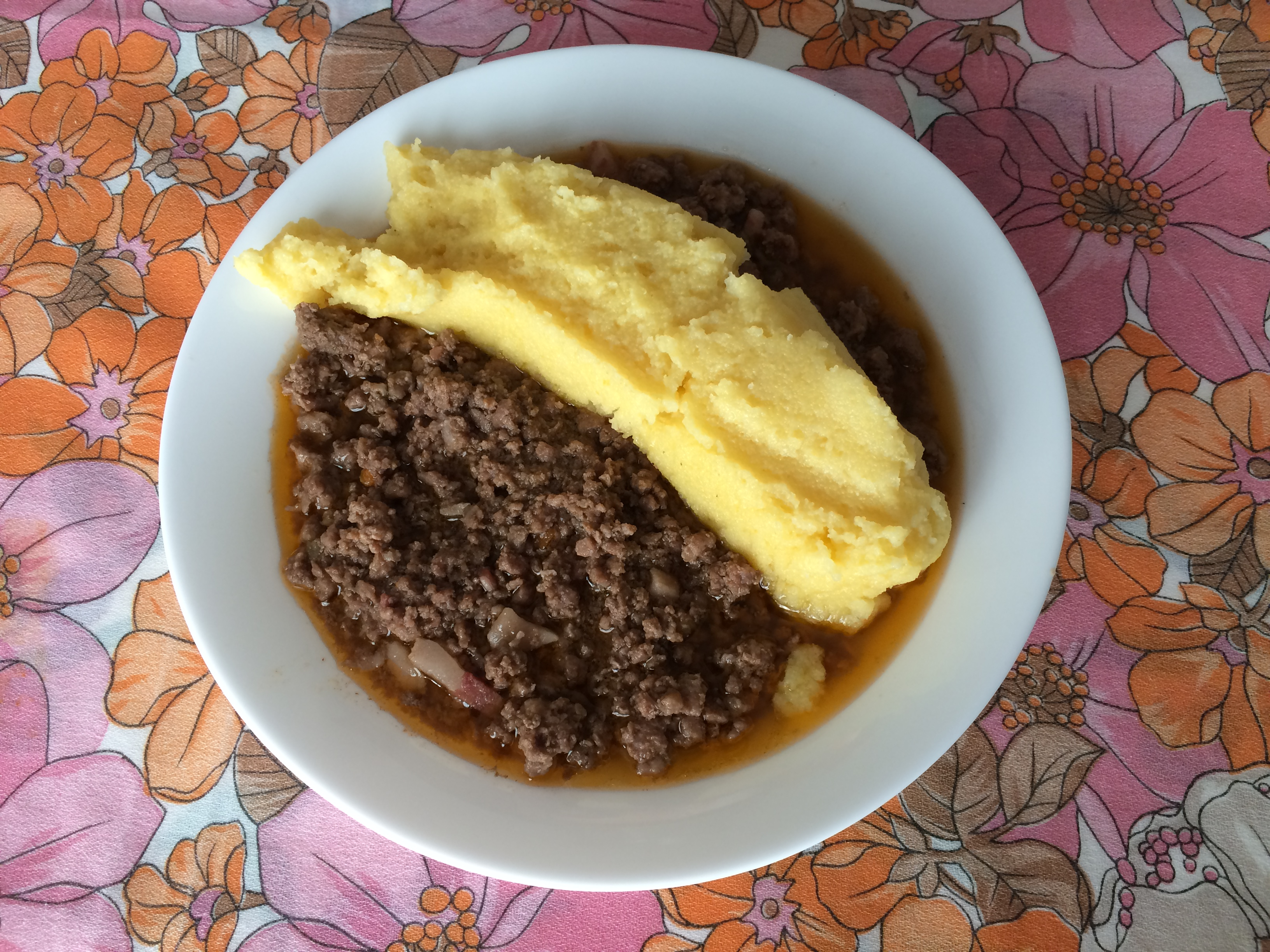
A plate of polenta and bruscitti

The Chapter Library of St. John the Baptist is a chapter library located in Busto Arsizio near the Basilica of St. John the Baptist. It is among the oldest libraries in the northwest area of Milan and one of the oldest cultural institutions in Lombardy. The current chapter library was officially established in 1583, but already by the end of the 14th century, a nucleus of texts collected by a group of priests had been established at the basilica, which later became part of the library's holdings.

Also notable is the Famiglia Legnanese, a nonprofit cultural association based in Legnano inside the central Villa Jucker. The association, which has always had no political or party connotations, was founded on February 27, 1951 in Legnano on the initiative of a group of prominent figures in culture and the local economy. On March 25, 2013, the President of the Italian Republic awarded the Famiglia Legnanese the Gold Medal of Merit for Culture and Art.

=== Education ===
There are two universities in the Alto Milanese area:

- University of Insubria
- University Carlo Cattaneo

=== Theaters ===
The following theaters are present in the Alto Milanese:

- Galleria di Legnano
- Teatro città di Legnano
- Teatro Sociale di Busto Arsizio

=== Museums ===
In the Alto Milanese area there are the following museums, among others:

- Museum of Textiles and Industry of Busto Arsizio
- Civic art collections of the Marliani-Cicogna palace in Busto Arsizio
- Busto Arsizio Museum of Sacred Art of St. Michael the Archangel
- Busto Arsizio hospital picture gallery
- Agorà della Scherma di Busto Arsizio
- Guido Sutermeister Civic Museum of Legnano
- Alfa Romeo “Fratelli Cozzi” Museum in Legnano
- Museo MAGA
- Fisogni Museum
- Frera Motorcycle Museum of Tradate

=== Events ===
Noteworthy among the events organized in the Alto Milanese are the Palio di Legnano and the Busto Arsizio Film Festival. The Palio di Legnano is a traditional festival that has been held annually in Legnano since 1935 to commemorate the battle of the same name fought on May 29, 1176 near the city between the troops of the Lombard League and the imperial army of Frederick Barbarossa. The territory of Legnano is divided into eight historical contrade (districts) that compete on the last Sunday in May in a horse race that closes the event. Events related to the Legnano Palio also include a historical parade and “La Fabbrica del Canto,” an international choral music event created in 1992 on the initiative of the Jubilate Music Association. In 2002, the historical parade of the Palio di Legnano was reenacted at Columbus Day in New York.

The Busto Arsizio Film Festival (stylized as B.A. Film Festival or BAFF) is a film festival established in 2003 that takes place annually in Busto Arsizio. The goals of the festival are to promote high-quality Italian productions, with particular attention to the various professionals working in the audiovisual field, and to spread film culture through screenings and workshops for students and meetings between major figures from the world of cinema and the public.

=== Cuisine ===
Originating in Busto Arsizio are bruscitti, a main course made from finely chopped beef cooked long. Its other ingredients are wild fennel seeds and red wine. The dish, which is widespread in the Alto Milanese and Verbano Cusio Ossola areas, is completed with the addition of polenta or mashed potatoes and can be accompanied by well-structured red wines such as Barbera, Barolo or Barbaresco.

== Anthropic geography ==
=== The municipalities belonging to the Alto Milanese ===
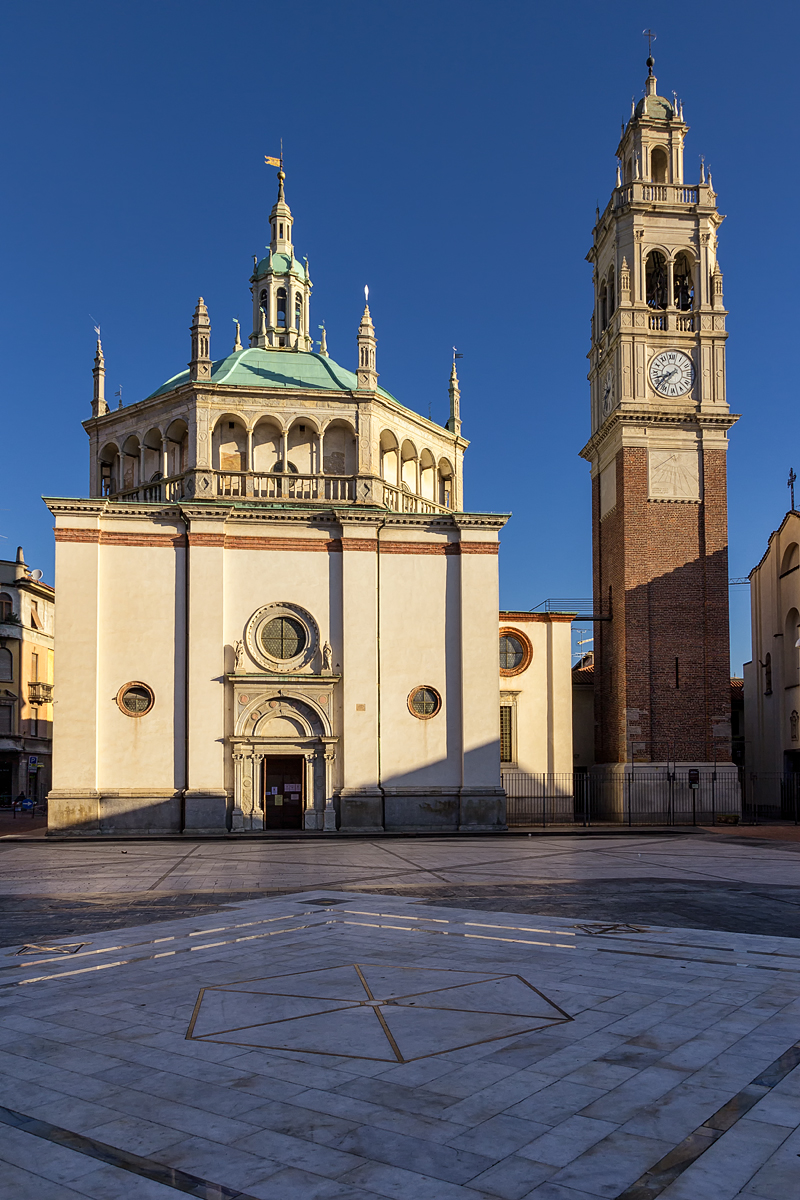
The sanctuary of Santa Maria di Piazza in Busto Arsizio

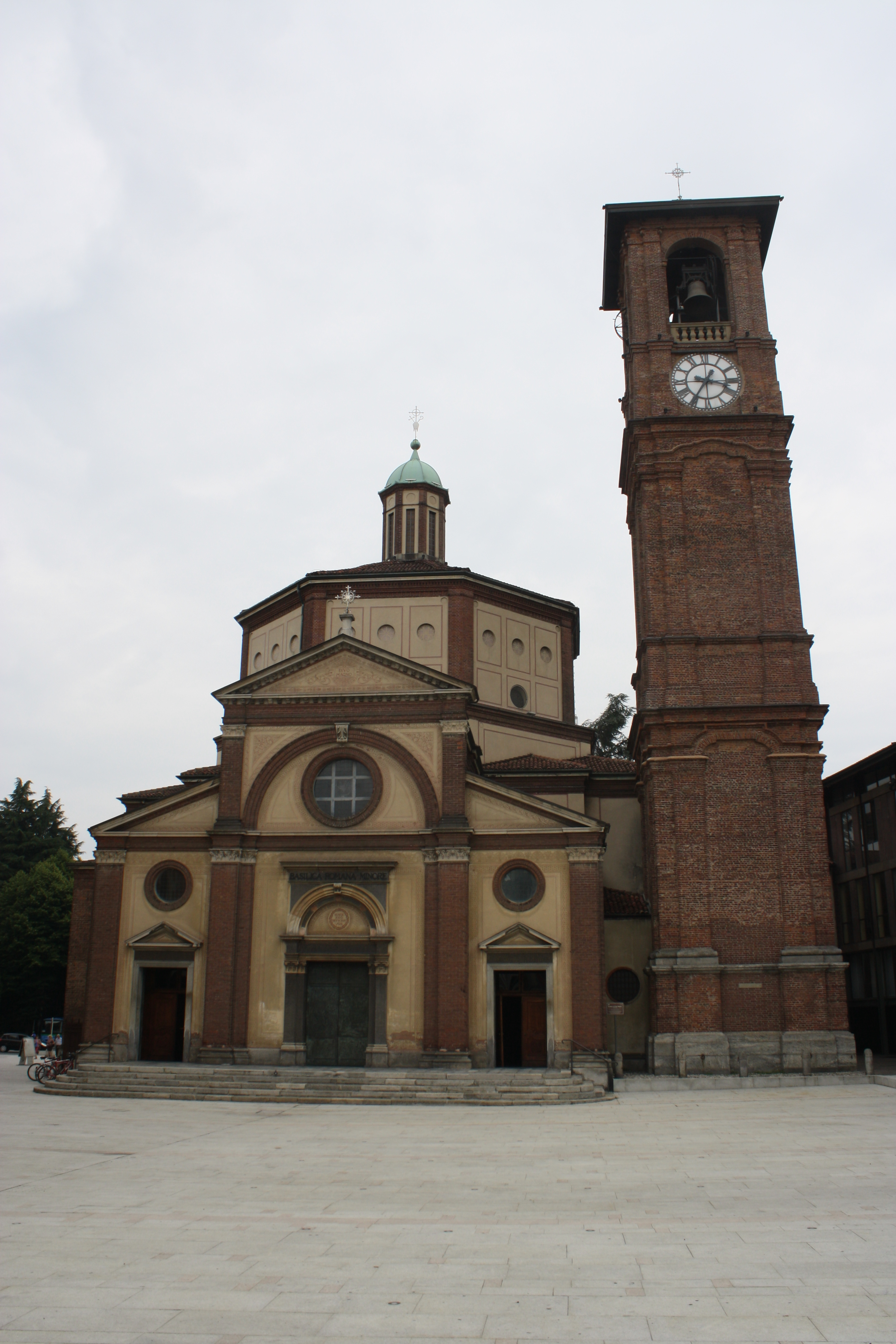
The Basilica of San Magno in Legnano

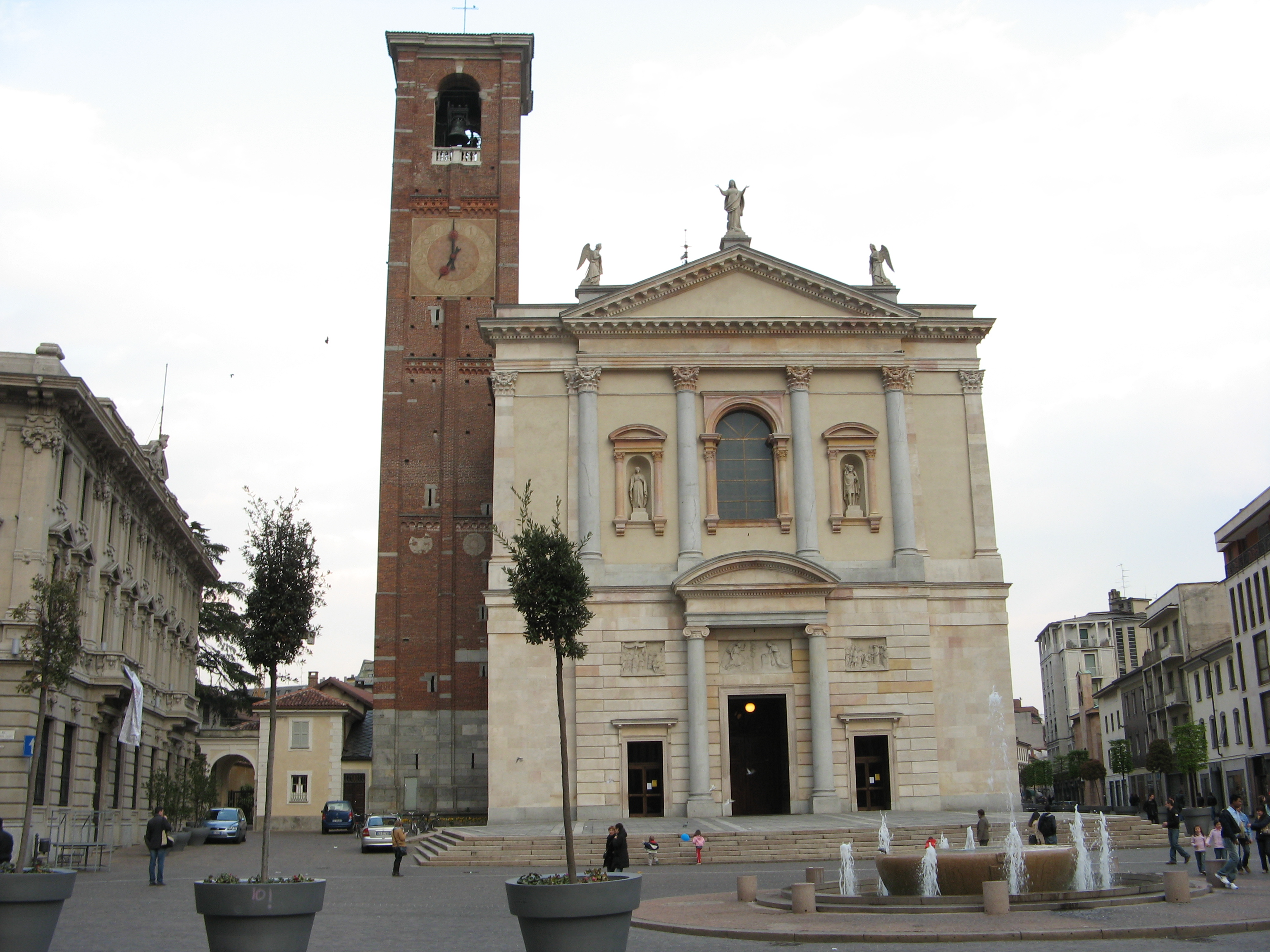
The Basilica of St. Mary in Gallarate

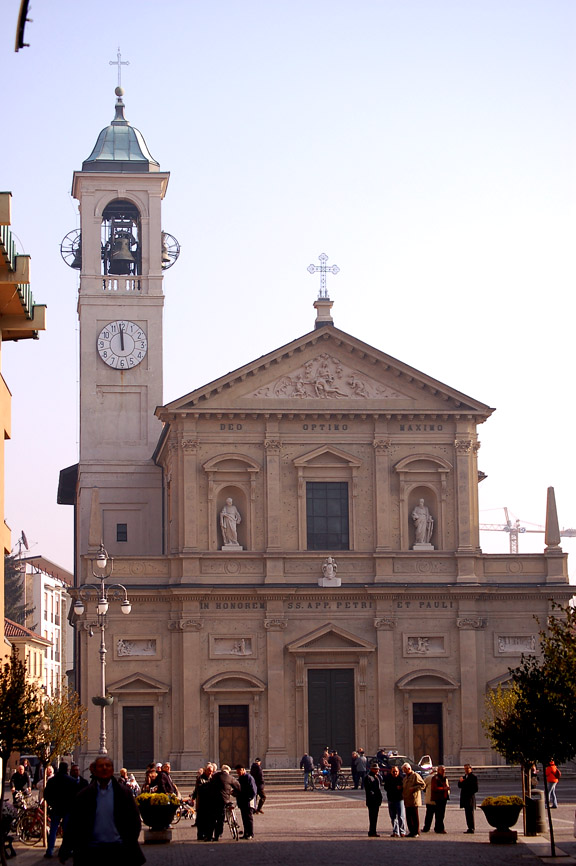
The church of Saints Peter and Paul in Saronno

According to economists and sociologists, having assessed the characteristics of socioeconomic and territorial homogeneity, the Alto Milanese is formed by the following municipalities as a whole:

Province of Varese
- Albizzate
- Angera
- Arsago Seprio
- Besnate
- Busto Arsizio
- Cadrezzate con Osmate
- Cairate
- Carnago
- Casorate Sempione
- Cassano Magnago
- Castellanza
- Castelseprio
- Castiglione Olona
- Cavaria con Premezzo
- Cislago
- Comabbio
- Fagnano Olona
- Ferno
- Gallarate
- Gerenzano
- Golasecca
- Gorla Maggiore
- Gornate Olona
- Jerago con Orago
- Lonate Ceppino
- Lonate Pozzolo
- Marnate
- Mercallo
- Mornago
- Oggiona con Santo Stefano
- Olgiate Olona
- Origgio
- Saronno
- Sesto Calende
- Solbiate Arno
- Solbiate Olona
- Sumirago
- Taino
- Tradate
- Uboldo
- Varano Borghi
- Vergiate
- Vizzola Ticino

Metropolitan City of Milan

- Arconate
- Bernate Ticino
- Buscate
- Busto Garolfo
- Canegrate
- Casorezzo
- Castano Primo
- Cerro Maggiore
- Cuggiono
- Dairago
- Inveruno
- Legnano
- Magnago
- Nerviano
- Nosate
- Parabiago
- Pogliano Milanese
- Rescaldina
- Robecchetto con Induno
- San Giorgio su Legnano
- San Vittore Olona
- Turbigo
- Vanzaghello
- Villa Cortese

Province of Como

- Carbonate
- Locate Varesino
- Mozzate

=== Major municipalities ===
Data updated to 2019

Municipality	Name in Lombard	Province	Territorial extension	Population
Busto Arsizio	Bustigrandi	Varese	30,27 km^{2}	83 884
Legnano	Lignan	Milano	17,72 km^{2}	60 531
Gallarate	Gallarad	Varese	20,97 km^{2}	53 339
Saronno	Saron	Varese	10,84 km^{2}	39 388
Parabiago	Parabiaa	Milano	14,16 km^{2}	27 825
Cassano Magnago	Cassan Magnagh	Varese	12,19 km^{2}	21 731
Tradate	Tradad	Varese	21,19 km^{2}	18 963
Somma Lombardo	Soma	Varese	30,54 km^{2}	18 012
Nerviano	Nervian	Milano	13,48 km^{2}	17 126
Samarate	Samarad	Varese	15,98 km^{2}	16 097
Cerro Maggiore	Scer	Milano	10,26 km^{2}	15 237
Castellanza	Castellanza	Varese	6,92 km^{2}	14 352
Rescaldina	Rescaldina	Milano	8,19 km^{2}	14 211

== Administration ==
=== Origins: the Seprio ===
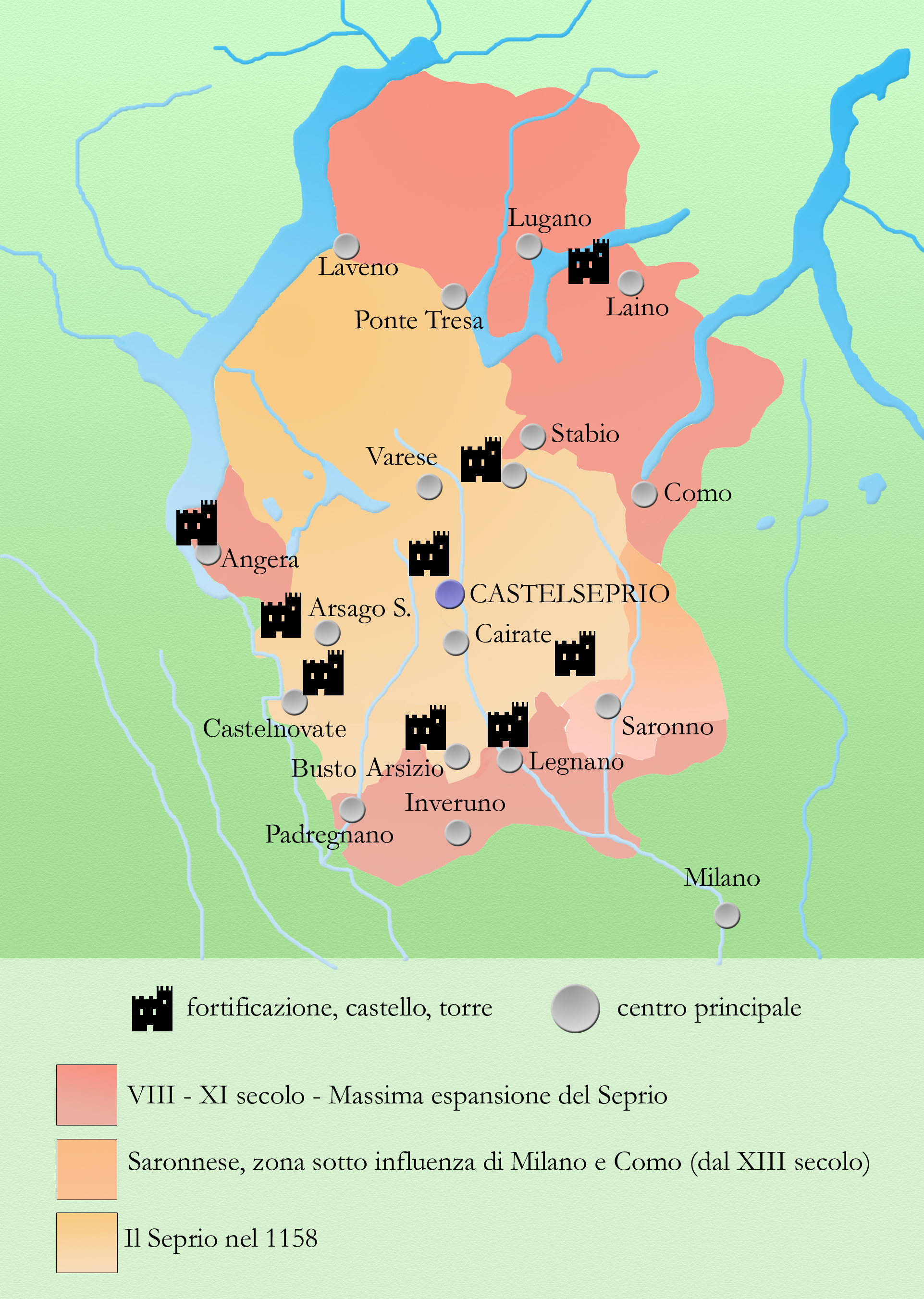
Map of Seprio

The boundaries of the modern Alto Milanese roughly coincide with the ancient county of Seprio. Seprio (Sevar in Lombard), which originated as the surroundings (fines) of the town of Castel Seprio, grew during the last century of the Roman Empire. In Lombard and then Frankish times it was established as an autonomous iudicaria and then comitatus, at least from the 7th century.

The 9th and 10th centuries represented the period of greatest territorial expansion and political power: the county of Seprio controlled an area that stretched from the Ticino River to the Intelvi Valley and from the county of Burgaria, i.e., today's Alto Milanese, to Sottoceneri, in what is now Ticino. With the 12th century a period of decline began, so much so that the comital family moved first to Venegono Superiore, then to Milan and then to Reggio Emilia.

In the 13th century, Seprio was involved in the struggles for control of Milan between the Visconti and Della Torre and lost control of Burgaria. In 1287 Seprio was incorporated into the Visconti territories of the Lordship of Milan, losing its autonomy. Subsequently, the name survived as a rural county, a territorial institution of the Duchy of Milan, until the reform of the modern provinces carried out by Emperor Joseph II of Austria in 1788, after which Seprio became the Austrian province of Gallarate, later called Varese.

=== From the Unification of Italy to the 21st Century ===
The core of the Alto Milanese consists of the Olona conurbation, that is, the urban area including, from north to south, the cities of Gallarate, Busto Arsizio, and Legnano. It is one of the most industrialized and densely populated areas in Italy: the Alto Milanese has a population of about 700,000 inhabitants spread over an area of 235 square kilometers. It largely corresponds with one of Italy's formerly planned provinces: the Seprio province.

Since the Unification of Italy, the Alto Milanese has had well-defined boundaries: it comprised the district of Gallarate (then part of the province of Milan), a subprefecture established in 1859 and suppressed in 1926. Nowadays, due to the administrative split it subsequently underwent, the Alto Milanese can be divided into four zones having as their main center their respective major cities: the Bustese, the Legnanese, the Gallaratese and the Saronnese.

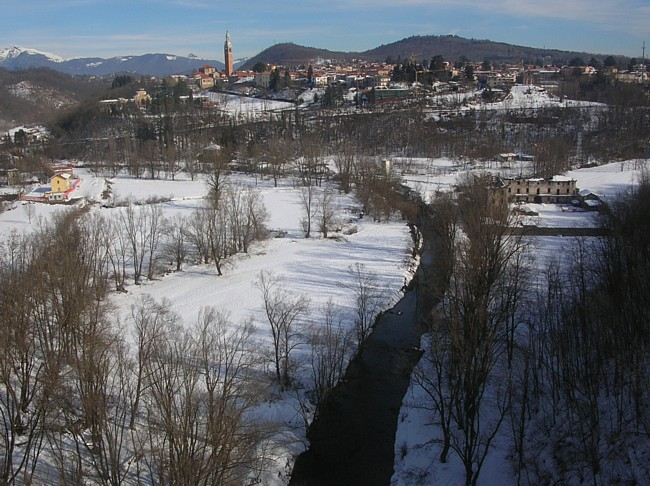
The Olona Valley in the area of Malnate

The Bustese corresponds to the area of the Alto Milanese that includes Busto Arsizio and some neighboring municipalities along the Olona Valley, also called the Middle Olona Municipalities. Over time, the area has become increasingly urbanized and the various municipalities have merged to form a single agglomeration. The Bustese municipalities are Busto Arsizio, Castellanza, Olgiate Olona, Fagnano Olona, Gorla Minore, Marnate, Gorla Maggiore and Solbiate Olona.

The Legnanese corresponds to the area of the Alto Milanese, which includes Legnano and some neighboring municipalities, located to the northwest of the metropolitan area of Milan, along the Olona River and the route of the Simplon highway, and included between Legnano and Nerviano. Among the municipalities belonging to the territory, it is possible to distinguish a group of municipalities more closely linked to Legnano, with which they are now urbanistically united in a single agglomeration: San Giorgio su Legnano, San Vittore Olona, Cerro Maggiore, Canegrate and Parabiago. Other Legnanese municipalities are Nerviano, Villa Cortese, Rescaldina e Dairago.

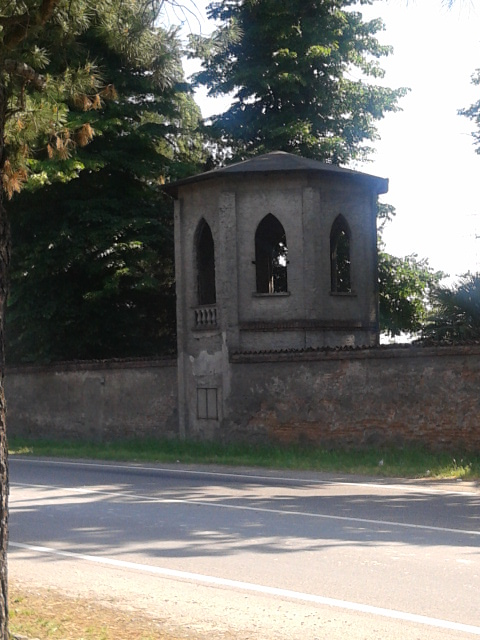
Simplon state road, ornamental turret in Costa San Lorenzo, on the border between the municipalities of Parabiago and Nerviano

The Gallaratese corresponds to the area of the Alto Milanese comprising Gallarate and some neighboring municipalities, located mainly along the course of the Arno River. Gallaratese includes the Malpensa International Airport. The municipalities of Gallaratese Gallarate, Cassano Magnago, Samarate, Cavaria con Premezzo, Cardano al Campo, Oggiona con Santo Stefano, Jerago con Orago, Albizzate, Solbiate Arno, Arsago Seprio, Besnate, Casorate Sempione and Sumirago

The Saronnese corresponds to the area, part of the Alto Milanese territory, including the city of Saronno and some neighboring municipalities included in the provinces of Varese, Como, Milan, Monza and Brianza. The Saronnese area includes Saronno (VA), Uboldo (VA), Origgio (VA), Gerenzano (VA), Caronno Pertusella (VA), Cislago (VA), Turate (CO), Rovellasca (CO), Rovello Porro (CO), Lazzate (MB), Misinto (MB), Cogliate (MB), Ceriano Laghetto (MB) and Solaro (MI).

Another area of the Alto Milanese can be identified with the northwestern territory of the metropolitan city of Milan, bounded on the west by the Ticino River. The main center of the area is Castano Primo, with its other municipalities being Arconate, Bernate Ticino, Buscate, Cuggiono, Inveruno, Magnago, Nosate, Robecchetto con Induno, Turbigo and Vanzaghello.

The northeastern area of the Alto Milanese, the one constituting the most historic core of the ancient Seprio county, includes Tradate, the major center of the area, as well as Carbonate, Castelseprio, Castiglione Olona, Gornate Olona, Locate Varesino, Lonate Ceppino, Mozzate, Venegono Inferiore and Venegono Superiore.

== Economy ==
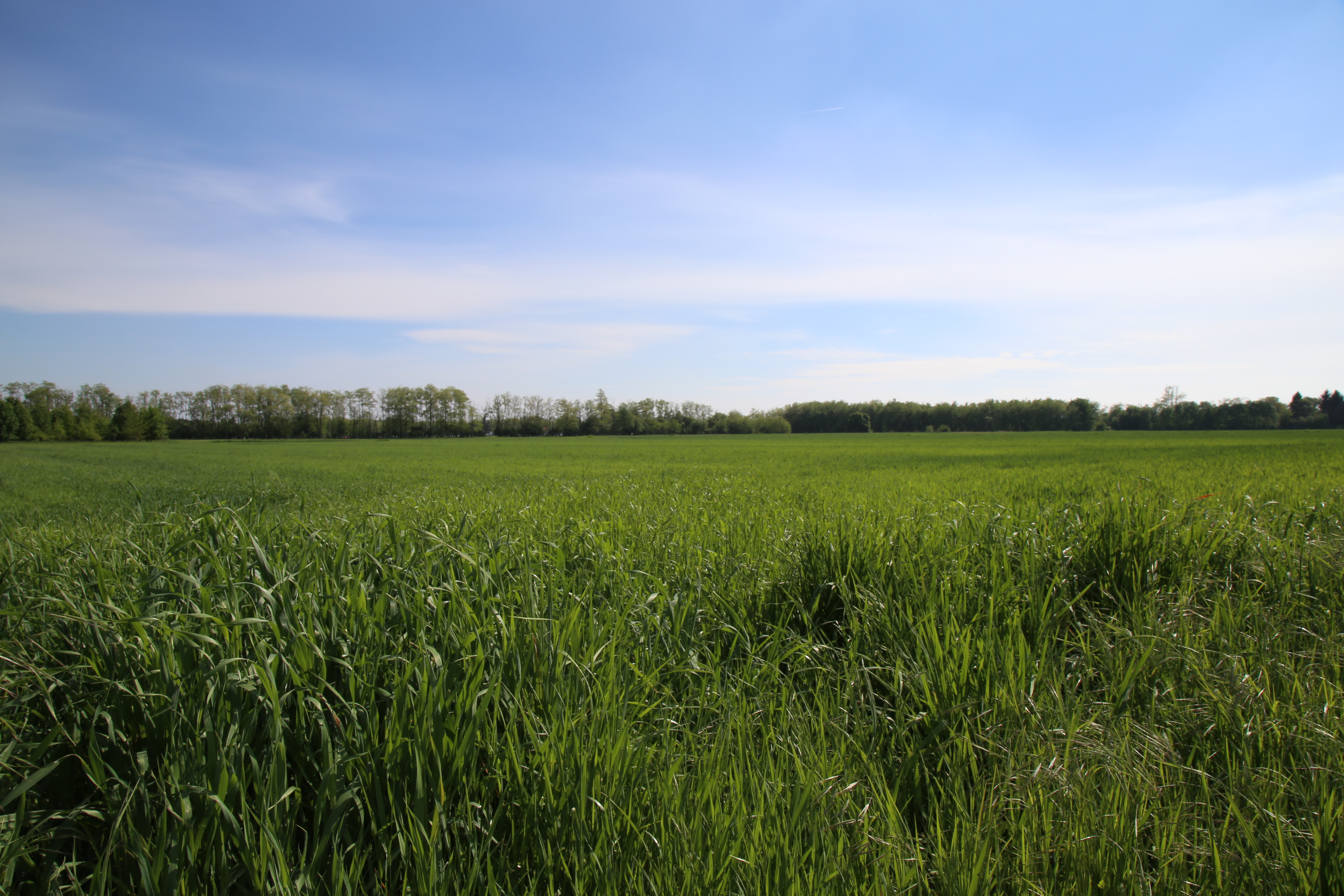
Glimpse of the Alto Milanese agricultural park in Legnano

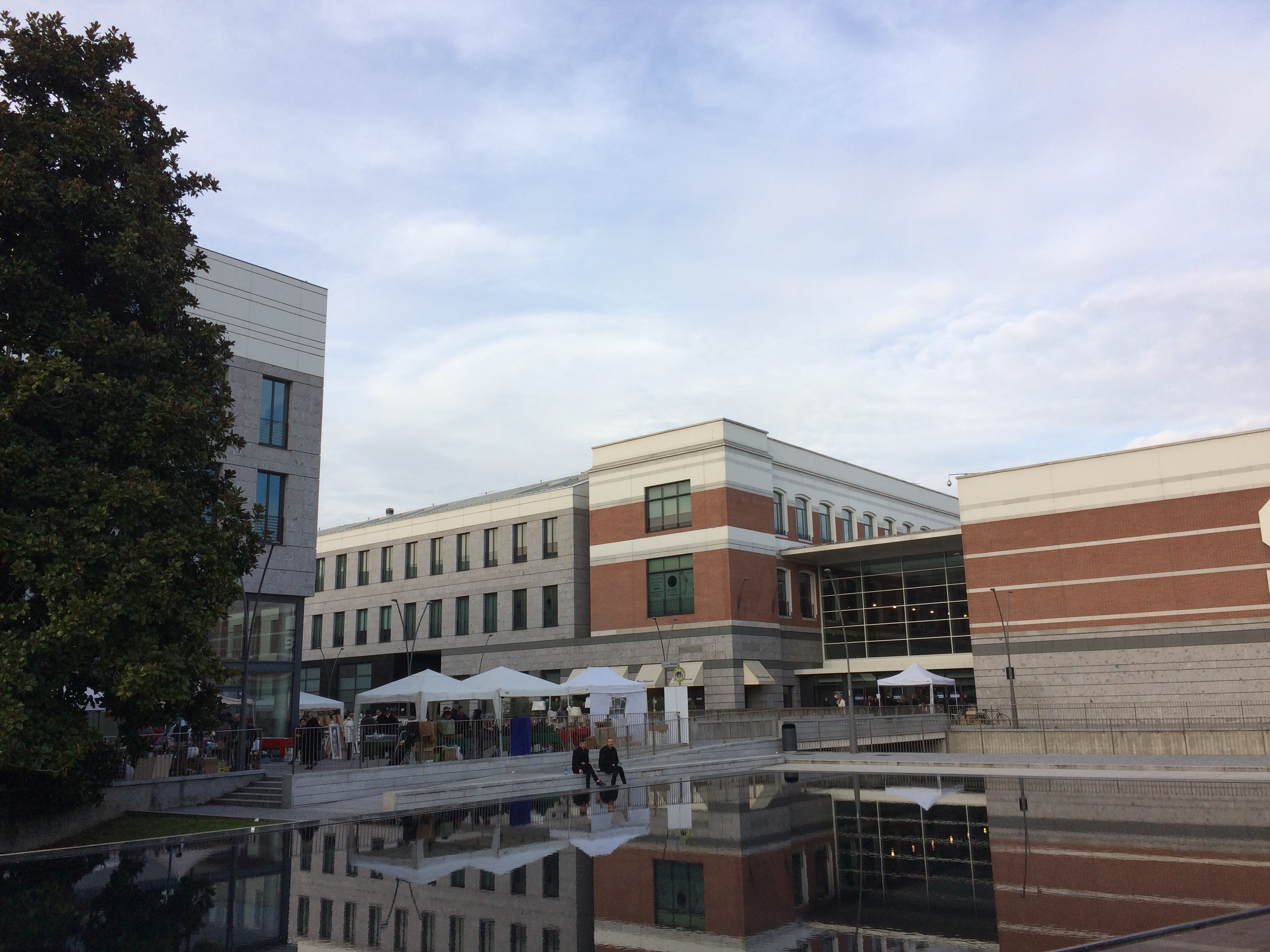
The "Gallerie Cantoni" shopping center in Legnano, partially built in the former cotton mill of the same name.

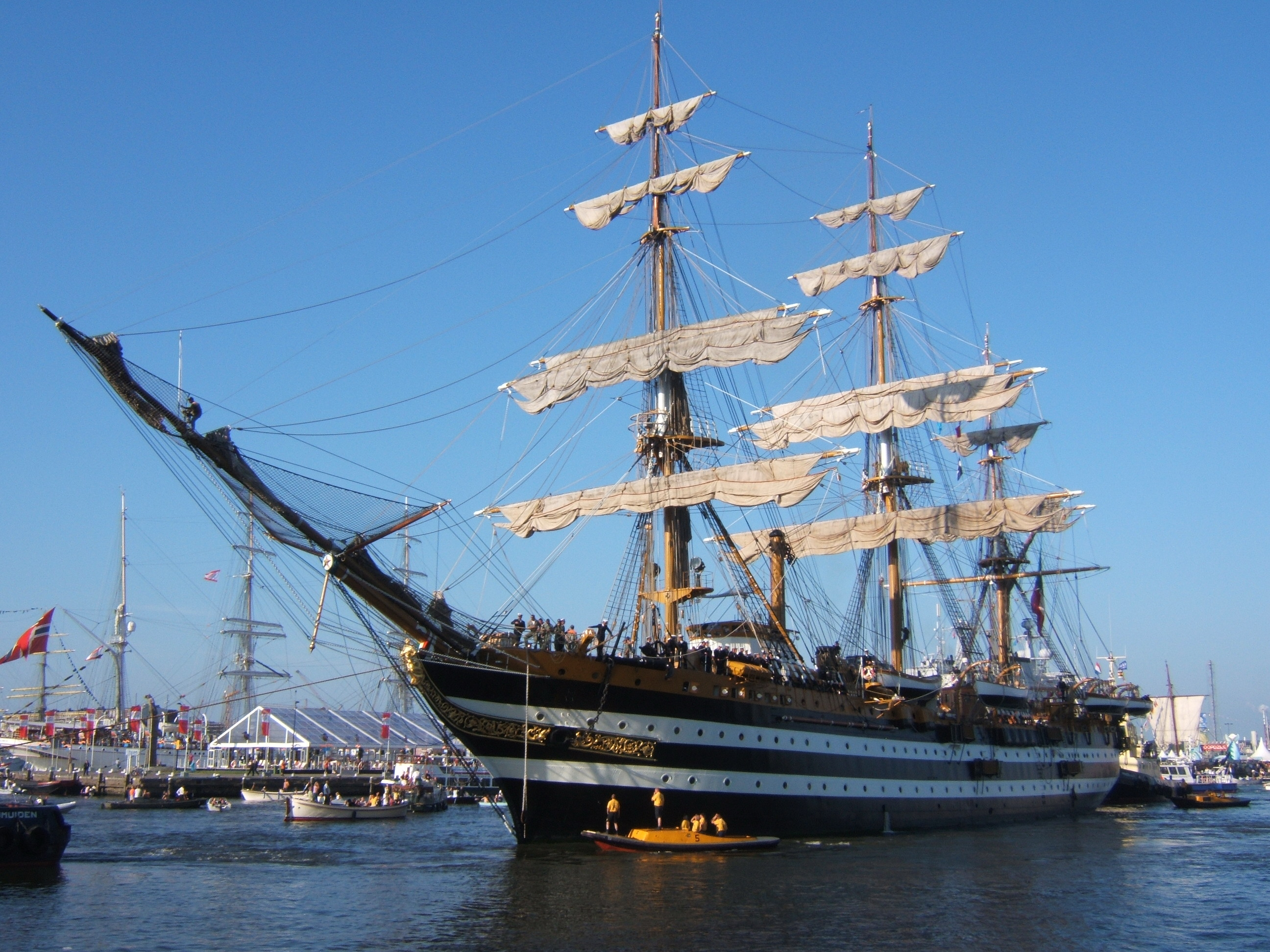
Italian training ship Amerigo Vespucci

The agriculture of the Alto Milanese has been the basis of the economic development of the area. It was first affected by the process of mechanization and restructuring. Mechanization, through the use of increasingly complex machinery, led to an increase in agricultural production. In the 21st century, it no longer represents an important activity for the economy of the Alto Milanese. Areas free of buildings and infrastructure are used to grow grain, mainly wheat and corn.

The golden age of Alto Milanese industry began at the beginning of the 20th century and ended in the 1960s of the same century. The crisis worsened, damaging the economy, employment and the industrial fabric. Many companies closed, especially in the textile, clothing and footwear sectors, and many others were involved in downsizing.

Between the 1980s and the 1990s there was a real phenomenon of deindustrialization of the area, which was not accompanied by the emergence of new activities. An attempt was therefore made to target the tertiary sector. However, these alternative fields did not lead to a sufficient rate of development to make up for the closure of industrial activities. A phase began in which the number of small businesses grew considerably. These processes continue to this day, with the birth and growth of small businesses, especially in mechanical engineering, plastic processing and construction. There is also a steady development of the commercial and tertiary sectors in the Alto Milanese.

Noteworthy, from an industrial point of view, is olona cloth, a type of coarse, heavy, and very strong weave cloth with very dense sett. A similar fabric, this time made from lighter yarns, is known as olonetta or light Olona cloth. Its origin is very ancient. The name comes from the Olona River, which was its source. The main use of this cloth, which made it well known and widespread in the past centuries, was in the nautical field, for sailmaking, sacks, nautical awnings, and sailors' cots (hammocks). The Amerigo Vespucci, a historic sailing ship of the Italian Navy, has sails made of olona cloth.

== Natural areas ==
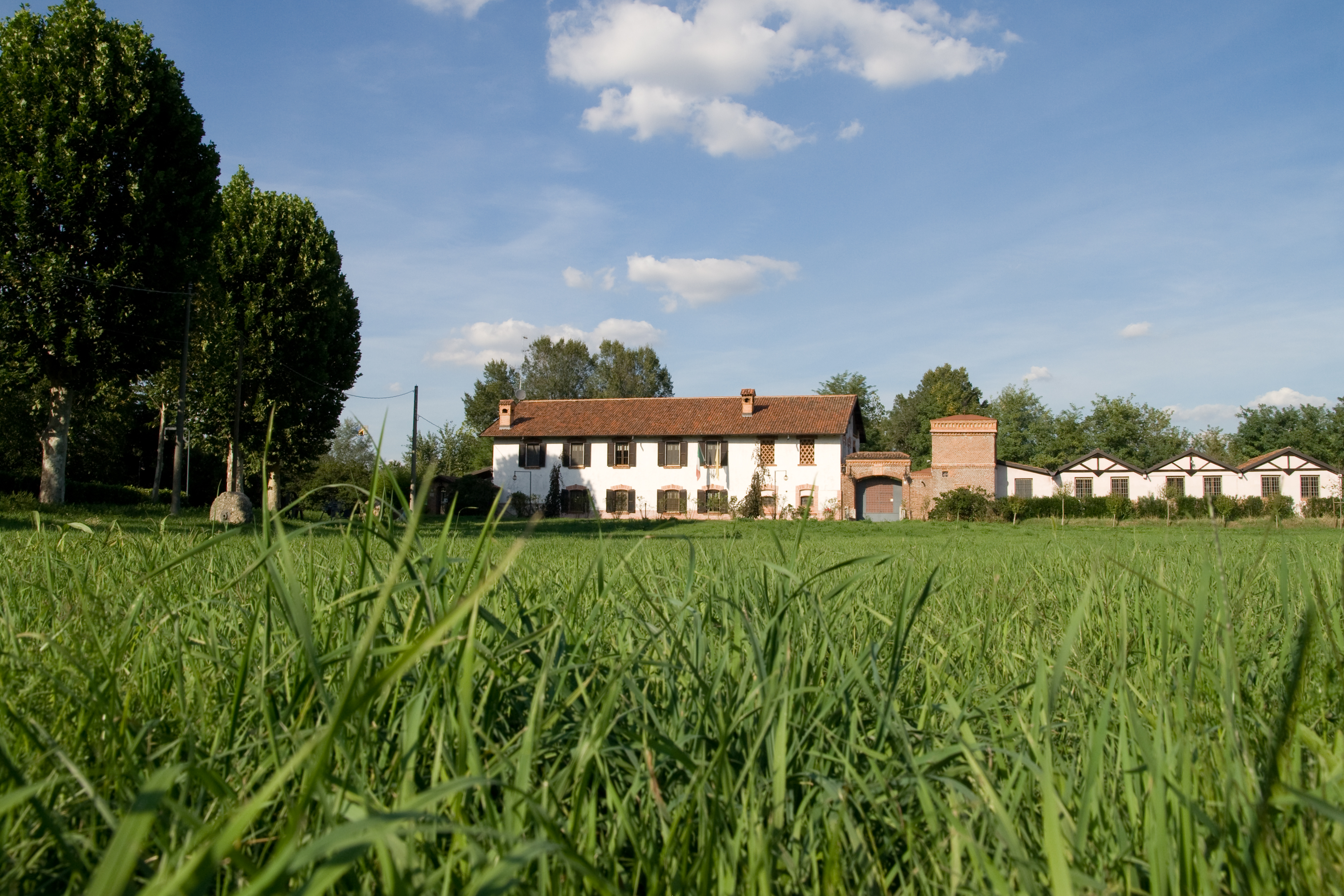
The Lampugnani Mill in Parabiago, which stands along the Olona River and is located in the Parco dei Mulini

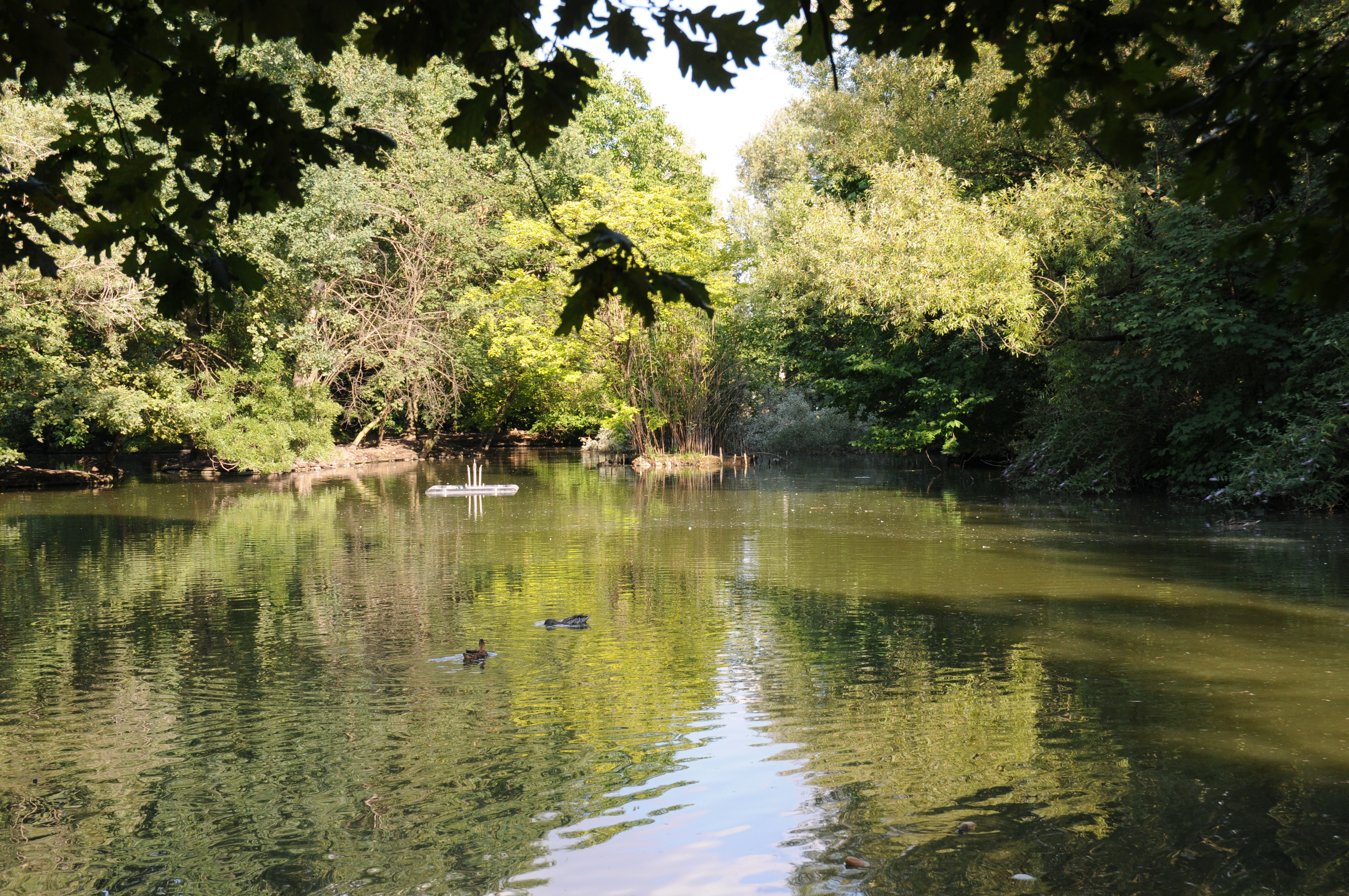
A view of the pond present within the Legnano Woodland Local Park

The Alto Milanese includes a number of natural parks:

Regional parks

- Parco naturale lombardo della Valle del Ticino
- Parco della Pineta di Appiano Gentile e Tradate

Local parks of supra-municipal interest (PLIS)

- Parco Alto Milanese
- Parco del bosco del Rugareto
- Parco del Lura
- Parco del Medio Olona
- Parco dei Mulini
- Parco Rile Tenore Olona
- Parco del Roccolo
- Parco dei Mughetti

Municipal parks

- Parco locale del bosco di Legnano
- Parco Ugo Foscolo di Busto Arsizio

== Infrastructure and transportation ==
=== Roads ===
The transportation hub of the Alto Milanese consists of the Autostrada dei laghi (A8 Milan-Varese, A9 Lainate-Como-Chiasso, and A26 Gallarate-Gattico branch road), the Sempione state road 33, state road 233 Varesina, and state road 527 Bustese. In particular, the Autostrada dei laghi was the first highway built in Italy. Also noteworthy is the Autostrada A36. Simplon State Road 33 begins at the Arco della Pace in Piazza Sempione in Milan and ends at the state border with Switzerland in Iselle (VB), while State Road 233 Varesina begins in Milan and ends at the state border with Switzerland in Ponte Tresa. State road 527 Bustese starts in Monza near Villa Reale and ends in Oleggio (NO).

=== Railways ===
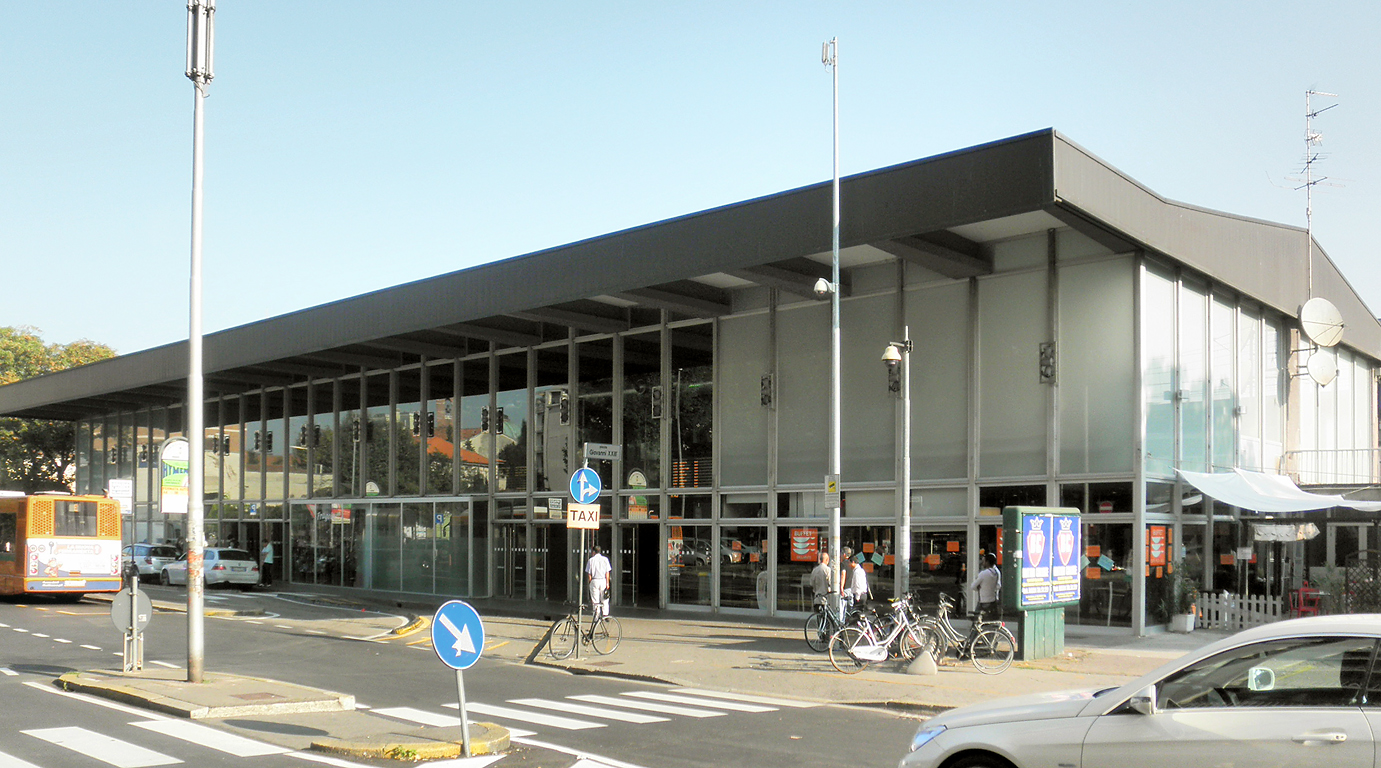
Gallarate railway station, which is counted among the Centostazioni of Italy.

The railway lines that cross the Alto Milanese are the Domodossola-Milan, Luino-Gallarate and Gallarate-Varese (operated by the Rete ferroviaria italiana company) and the Saronno-Novara line with its Sacconago-Malpensa Aeroporto branch line (operated by Ferrovienord). Also worth mentioning is the Valmorea Railway, a progressively depowered and decommissioned railway line that has been partially reactivated for tourist purposes with steam traction. Of note is the Gallarate station, which is counted among the Centostazioni of Italy. Also noteworthy in the railway sphere is the Hupac terminal in Busto Arsizio, which is the largest freight terminal between rail and road in Europe, having a capacity of about 8 million tons per year and an annual traffic volume of 420,000 intermodal transport units.

=== Airports ===
In the Alto Milanese area is the Milan Malpensa Airport, an intercontinental airport located in the municipality of Ferno. It is the main hub airport for Milan, which operates it through the Società Esercizi Aeroportuali (SEA). In 2019, about 28.8 million passengers and 558,000 tons of cargo transited through Malpensa, confirming it as Italy's leading airport in terms of cargo traffic and the second airport in Italy in terms of passenger traffic after Rome Fiumicino Airport. It is home to several airlines, such as Air Italy, Alitalia, EasyJet, Blue Panorama Airlines, Ryanair, and Ernest Airlines. It is also the hub for cargo airline Cargolux Italia and passenger airlines Air Italy and Neos.

== Sports ==
"Matches with emotion, like Pro Patria - Legnano. It's matches like this, with this charm, that can beat the football of business, of violence, of depravity".

— Franco Scoglio

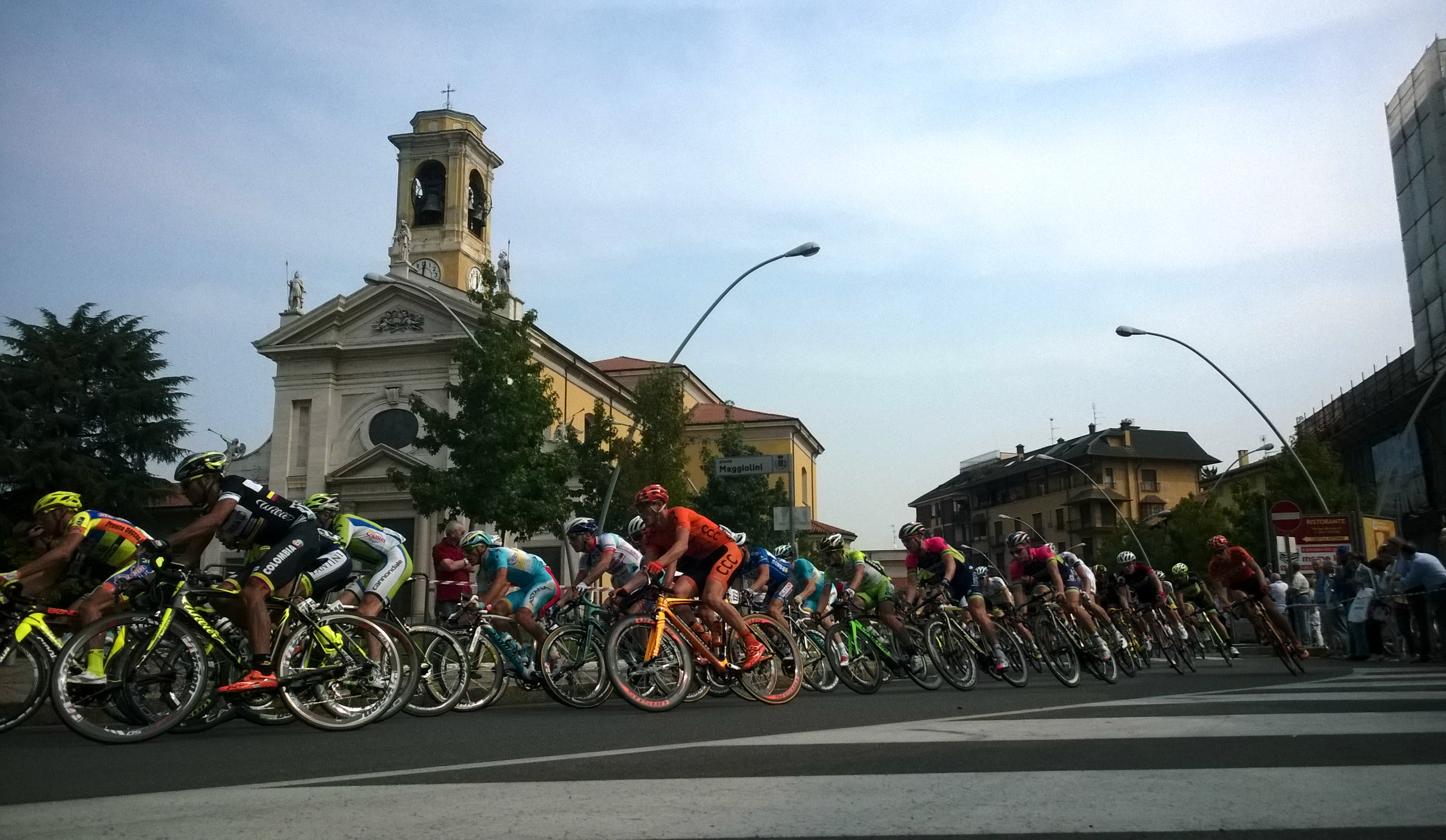
A moment of the 2014 Bernocchi Cup in Parabiago

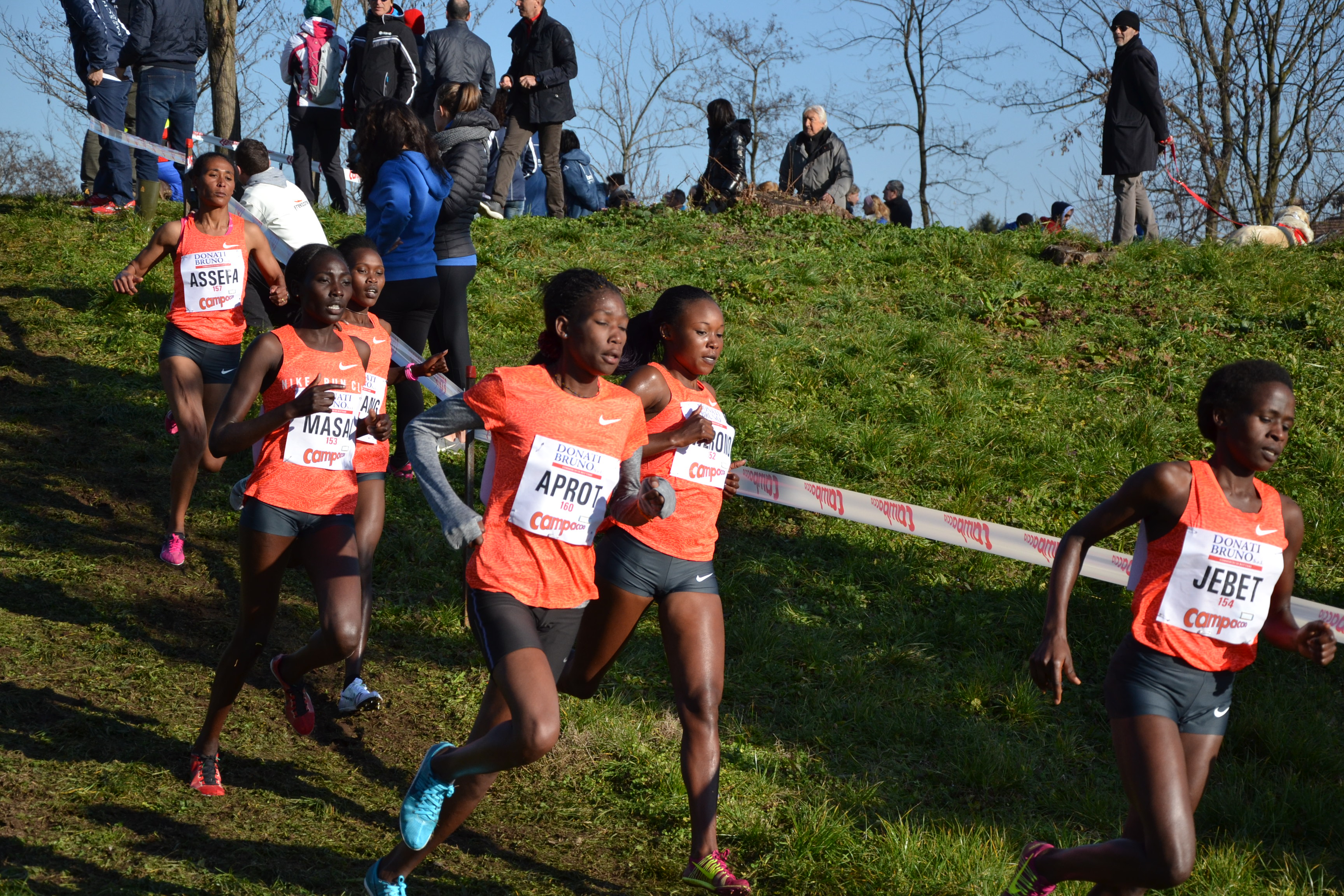
A moment from the 2016 Campaccio

The most heated soccer rivalry in the Alto Milanese is between the Associazione Calcio Legnano and Pro Patria, the most important soccer team in neighboring Busto Arsizio. The fates of the two teams have often crossed, even in Serie A, creating the Altomilanese football derby.

The antagonism between the two football teams was sparked in 1928, on the occasion of the first official direct clash between the two teams, at a time when both teams aspired, with alternating fortunes, to the National Division, which at the time was the name of the top-level league in Italian soccer. A Legnano-Pro Patria derby was the occasion for the naming of the Legnano stadium in Via Pisacane after Giovanni Mari.

The rivalry between Legnano and Busto Arsizio, not only in soccer, is centuries old. In fact, frictions between the two cities have existed since the Middle Ages. In this historical era, Busto Arsizio gravitated around Seprio, while Legnano was linked to its antagonist, namely Milan. Also noteworthy is the Altomilanese women's volleyball derby between Futura Volley Busto Arsizio and Gruppo Sportivo Oratorio Pallavolo Femminile Villa Cortese, which was also played in Serie A1.

Over the years, other Altomilanese derbies have taken place, both in football and in other sports, considered minor because they have never been played in their respective top leagues. An example is the Altomilanese basketball derby, played in Serie B2 between Sangiorgese Basket of San Giorgio su Legnano and the Legnano Basket Knights.

Among the sports competitions organized in the Alto Milanese are the Campaccio and Cinque Mulini cross-country races (both included in the World Athletics Cross Country Permit international circuit), the Coppa Bernocchi bicycle race, and the San Giorgio su Legnano chess tournament. The latter entered the Guinness Book of Records for the largest number of participants in a chess competition, counting as many as nine hundred and twenty-six competitors, including the then FIDE world champion Anatoly Karpov, while the Campaccio and Cinque Mulini, which are among the most important events of their kind in Italy, are attended by internationally renowned athletes, including Olympic and world champions.

Specifically, the Bernocchi Cup is a men's road race that takes place between the Alto Milanese and Varese areas. Named after Antonio Bernocchi and organized by the Unione Sportiva Legnanese, it is part of the UCI Europe Tour calendar, class 1.1. Together with the Tre Valli Varesine and the Coppa Agostoni it forms the "Trittico Lombardo".

The Alto Milanese hosted the 2006 European Cross Country Championships and the 2012 European Fencing Championships, the former in San Giorgio su Legnano and the latter in Legnano.

== See also ==
- Legnanese (region)
- Olona mills

== Bibliography ==
- Agnoletto, Attilio (1992). San Giorgio su Legnano - storia, società, ambiente.
- Autori vari (2015). Il Palio di Legnano : Sagra del Carroccio e Palio delle Contrade nella storia e nella vita della città. Banca di Legnano.
- Carlo Azimonti (1939). Linguaggio Bustocco. Industria d'arti grafiche P. Pellegatta.
- Giorgio D'Ilario, Egidio Gianazza, Augusto Marinoni e Marco Turri (1984). Profilo storico della città di Legnano. Edizioni Landoni.
- D'Ilario, Giorgio (2003). Dizionario legnanese. Artigianservice.
- Giorgio D'Ilario, Iginio Monti e Marco Tajè (1993). Quando si dice lilla. Legnano: Famiglia Legnanese-Banca di Legnano.
- Di Maio, Paola (1998). Lungo il fiume. Terre e genti nell'antica valle dell'Olona. Corsico: Teograf.
- Ferrarini, Gabriella (2001). Legnano. Una città, la sua storia, la sua anima. Telesio editore.
- Miedico, Cristina (2014). "Di città in città – Insediamenti, strade e vie d'acqua da Milano alla Svizzera lungo la Mediolanum-Verbannus". Soprintendenza Archeologia della Lombardia: 13–28.
- Andrea Rognoni (2005). Grammatica dei dialetti della Lombardia. Mondadori.
- Cesare Saibene (1986). Guide d'Italia: Milano, i laghi prealpini e la Brianza, la pianura lombarda. Fabbri.
- Glauco Sanga (1984). Dialettologia lombarda. Lingue e culture popolari. Dipartimento di Scienza della Letteratura dell'Università di Pavia.
- Vecchio, Giorgio (2001). Legnano 1945 -2000. Il tempo delle trasformazioni. Nomos Edizioni.
