= Taino, Lombardy =

Taino
- Comune
- Comune di Taino
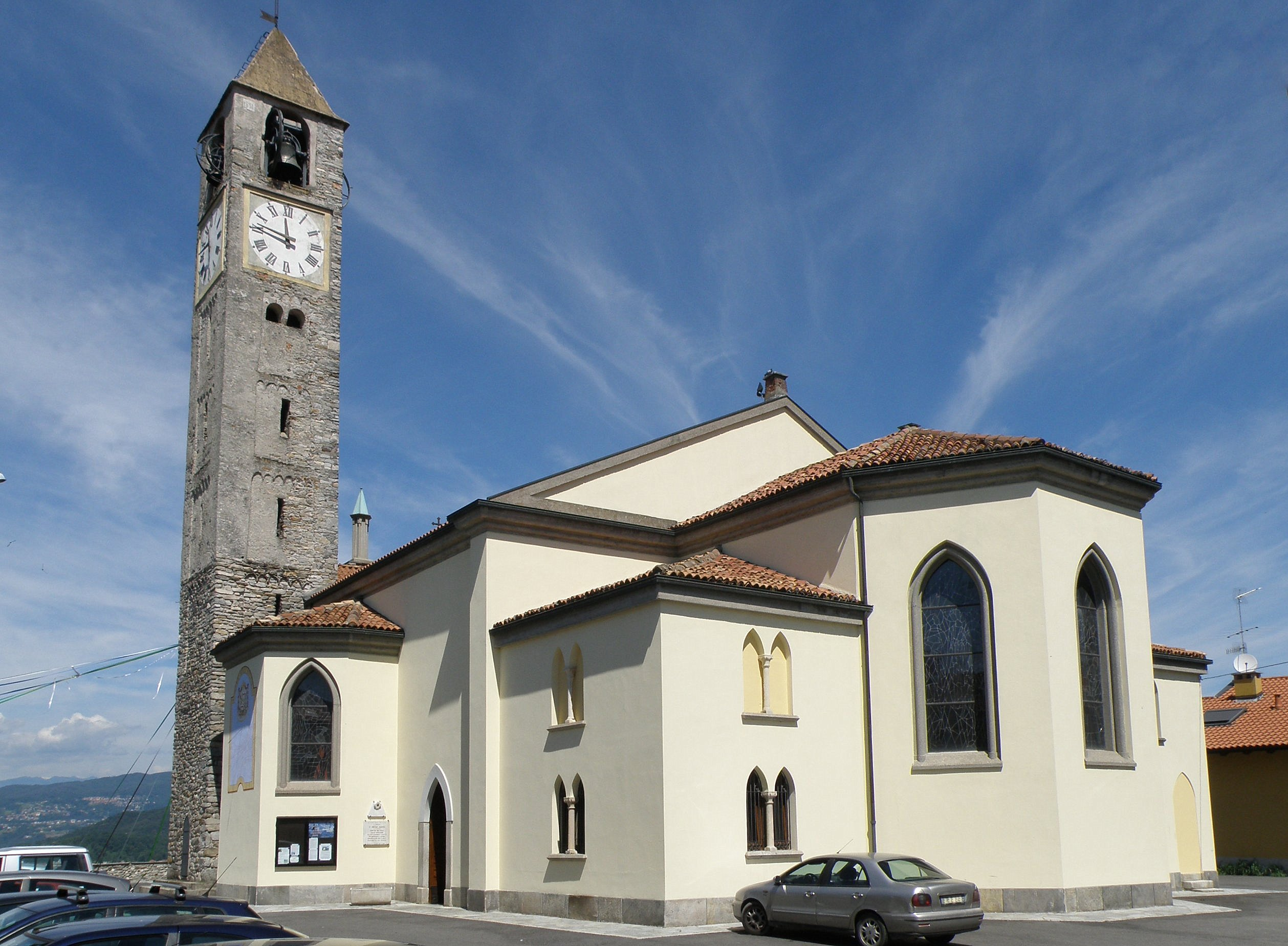

- Location within Italy Location within Lombardy
- Coordinates: 45°46′N 8°37′E
- Country: Italy
- Region: Lombardy
- Province: Province of Varese (VA)
- Frazioni: Cheglio

Government
  - Mayor: Marco Mira Catò

Area
  - Total: 7.7 km^{2} (3.0 sq mi)
- Elevation: 262 m (860 ft)

Population (Dec. 2004)
  - Total: 3,353
  - Density: 440/km^{2} (1,100/sq mi)
- Demonym: Tainesi (dumìt in local dialect)
- Time zone: UTC+1 (CET)
  - Summer (DST): UTC+2 (CEST)
- Postal code: 21020
- Dialing code: 0331
- Website: Official website

Taino (Italian pronunciation: [taˈiːno]) is a comune (municipality) in the Province of Varese in the Italian region Lombardy, located about 50 km (31 mi) northwest of Milan and about 20 km (12 mi) southwest of Varese. As of 31 December 2004, it had a population of 3,353 and an area of 7.7 km^{2} (3.0 sq mi).

The municipality of Taino contains the frazione (subdivision) Cheglio (pronounced [ˈkeʎʎo]).

Taino borders the following municipalities: Angera, Sesto Calende.

== Demographic evolution ==
Historical population

Year	Pop.	±%
1861	1,249	—
1871	1,394	+11.6%
1881	1,535	+10.1%
1901	1,658	+8.0%
1911	1,594	−3.9%

Year	Pop.	±%
1921	1,642	+3.0%
1931	1,538	−6.3%
1936	1,609	+4.6%
1951	2,095	+30.2%
1961	2,304	+10.0%

Year	Pop.	±%
1971	2,583	+12.1%
1981	2,760	+6.9%
1991	2,928	+6.1%
2001	3,185	+8.8%

Source: Data from ISTAT
