= Lago di Monate =

Lake in Lombardy, Italy

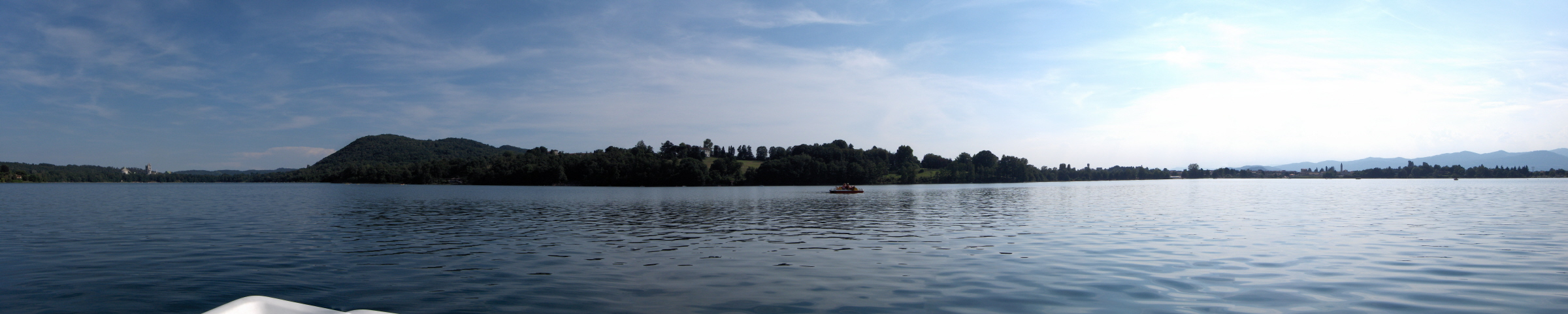
- Panoramic image of Lago di Monate

- Location within Lombardy
- Location: Province of Varese, Lombardy
- Coordinates: 45°47′43″N 8°39′40″E
- Basin countries: Italy
- Max. length: 7.75 km (4.82 mi)
- Surface area: 2.5 km^{2} (0.97 sq mi)
- Average depth: 18 m (59 ft)
- Max. depth: 34 m (112 ft)
- Surface elevation: 266 m (873 ft)

Lago di Monate is a lake in the Province of Varese, Lombardy, Italy. At an elevation of 266 m, its surface area is 2.52 km^{2}. The municipalities of Cadrezzate, Comabbio, Osmate and Travedona-Monate border the lake.

The lake is a historically popular location for fishing. Non-native species such as largemouth bass and rainbow trout have been stocked into the lake. In 1876, Bronze Age artifacts, including pottery shards and Neolithic flint tools, were discovered at the lake.
