= Strada statale 336 dell'Aeroporto della Malpensa =

State highway in Italy

State Highway 336
- Strada statale 336
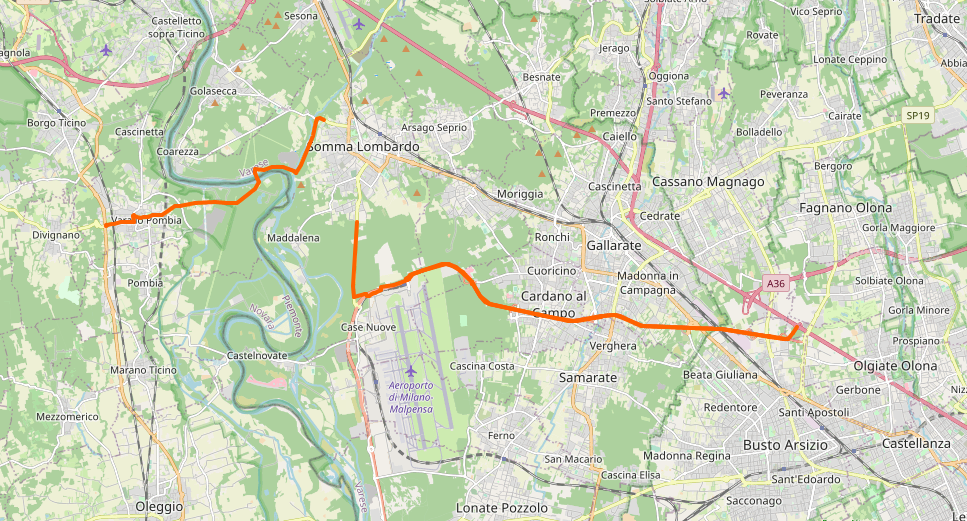

Route information
- Maintained by ANAS
- Length: 38.8 km (24.1 mi)
- Existed: 1990–present

Major junctions
- From: A8 Busto Arsizio exit
- To: A4 Marcallo-Mesero exit

Location
- Country: Italy
- Regions: Lombardy

Highway system
- Roads in Italy; Autostrade; State; Regional; Provincial; Municipal
← SS 335 dir	→ SS 336 dir

Strada statale 336 dell'Aeroporto della Malpensa (SS 336) is an Italian state highway 38.8 kilometres (24.1 mi) long in Italy in the region of Lombardy that connects the Milan-Varese motorway with the Turin-Trieste motorway, skirting the Milan Malpensa Airport.

== Route ==
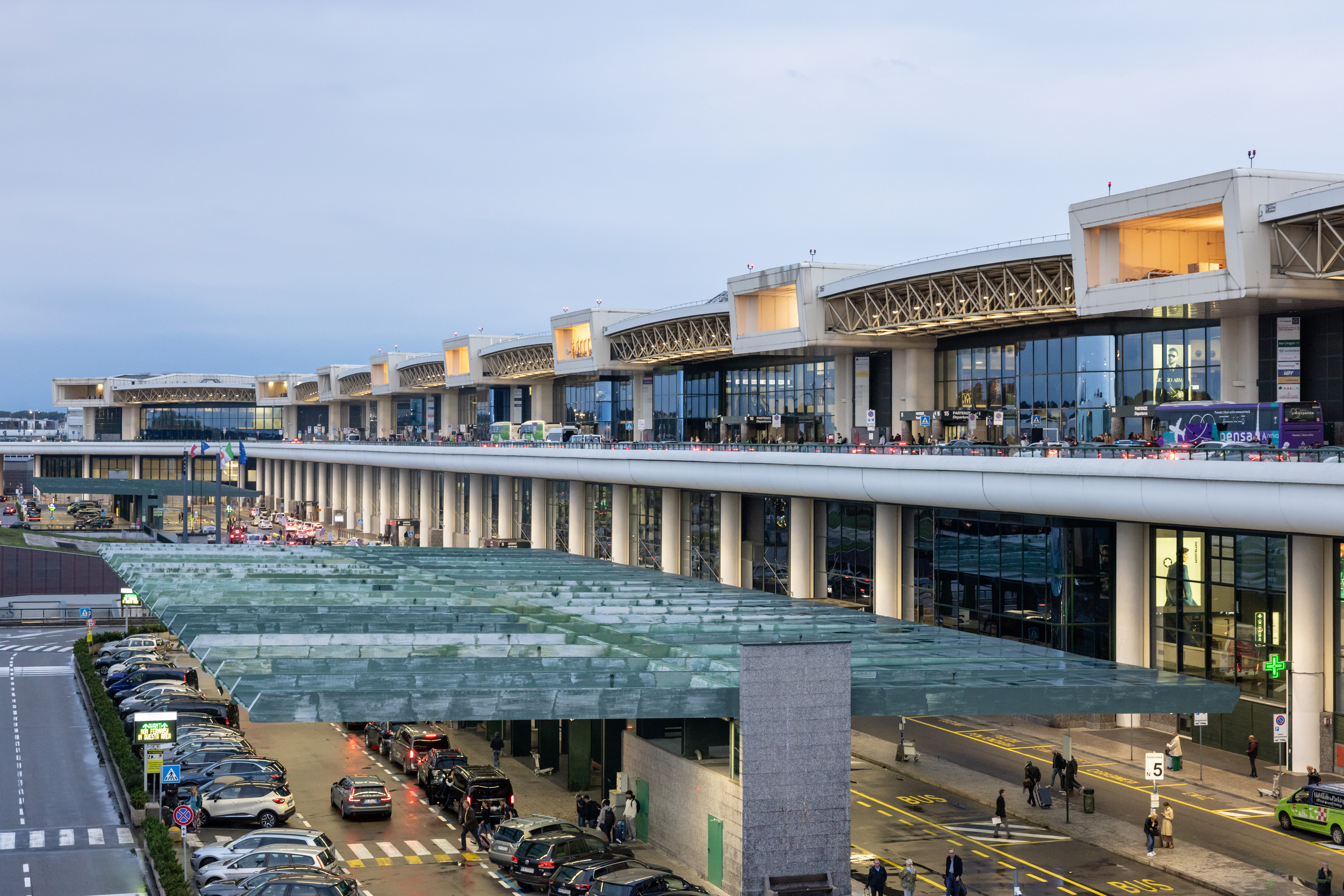
Milan Malpensa Airport

Superstrada Malpensa 2000
Exit	km	Province
Milano-Varese Busto Arsizio interchange	0.0 km (0 mi)	VA
Cassano Magnago - Busto Arsizio	0.4 km (0.25 mi)	VA
del Sempione; Gallarate - Varese	2.4 km (1.5 mi)	VA
Gallaratese; Gallarate - Samarate	4.6 km (2.9 mi)	VA
Cardano al Campo - Gallarate	5.5 km (3.4 mi)	VA
Cardano al Campo - Ferno	7.7 km (4.8 mi)	VA
del Ciglione; Casorate Sempione	9.0 km (5.6 mi)	VA
Terminal 2 dell'Aeroporto di Malpensa - Somma Lombardo	10.8 km (6.7 mi)	VA
della Battaglia di Tornavento; Somma Lombardo	12.6 km (7.8 mi)	VA
Terminal 1 Vizzola Ticino della Battaglia di Tornavento	14.6 km (9.1 mi)	VA
Cargo City della Battaglia di Tornavento; Somma Lombardo - Lonate Pozzolo	16.4 km (10.2 mi)	VA
ex Bustese; Oleggio - Busto Arsizio	19.9 km (12.4 mi)	VA
Lonate Pozzolo	22.0 km (13.7 mi)	VA
dell'Aeroporto di Malpensa; Vanzaghello	24.1 km (15.0 mi)	MI
Castano Primo north	25.8 km (16.0 mi)	MI
Castano Primo south - Buscate north	28.2 km (17.5 mi)	MI
Cuggiono north - Buscate south	30.5 km (19.0 mi)	MI
Cuggiono south - Mesero north	33.9 km (21.1 mi)	MI
Mesero south Torino-Trieste Marcallo-Mesero interchange	35.8 km (22.2 mi)	MI
dell'Esticino; Padana Superiore; Magenta - Abbiategrasso - Pavia	38.8 km (24.1 mi)	MI

== See also ==
- State highways (Italy)
- Roads in Italy
- Transport in Italy

=== Other Italian roads ===
- Autostrade of Italy
- Regional road (Italy)
- Provincial road (Italy)
- Municipal road (Italy)
