= Borsano =

Frazione of Busto Arsizio, Italy

Borsano Bursàn
- Frazione
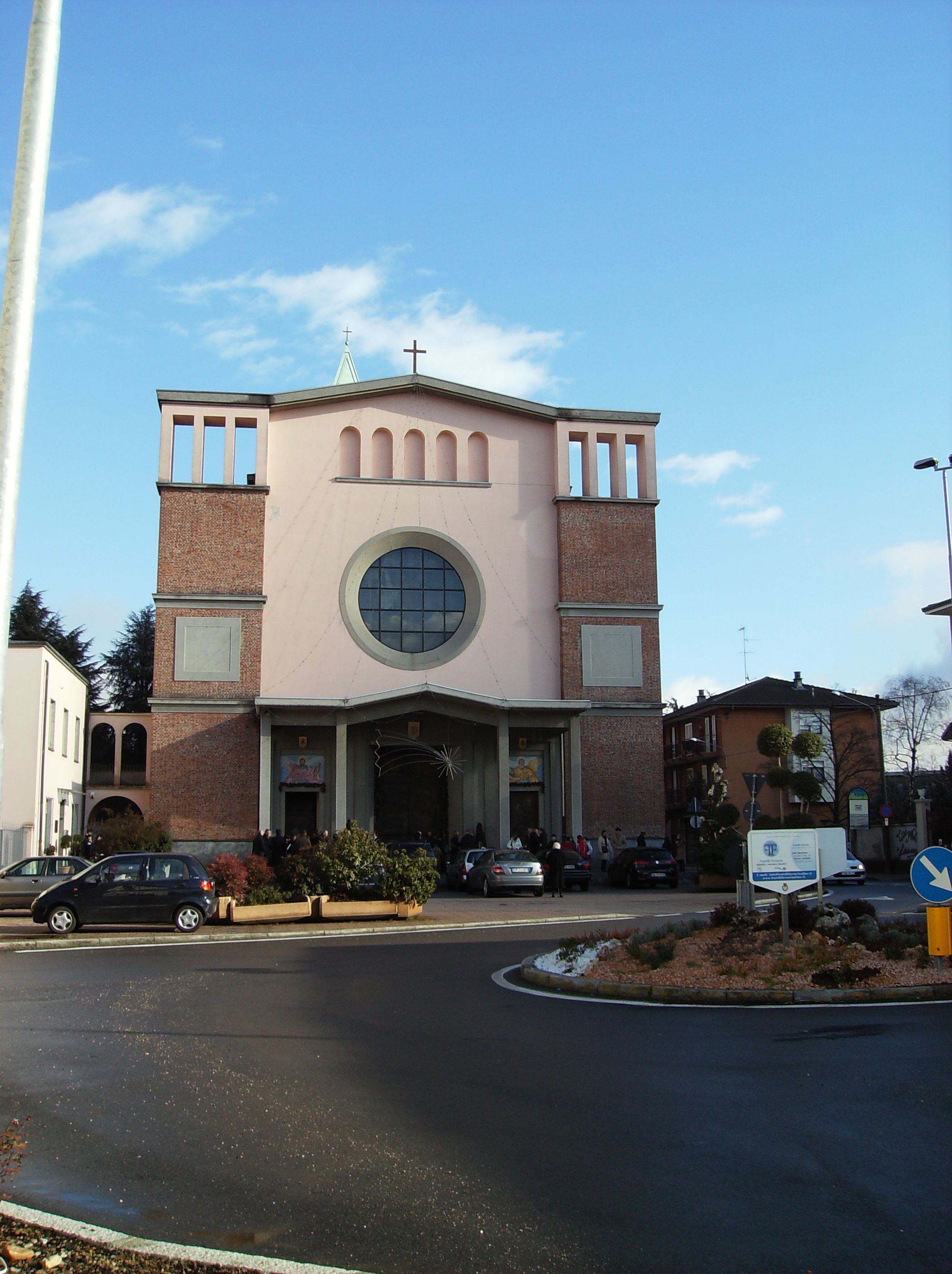
- Piazza Gallarini and the parish church
- Interactive map of Borsano
- Coordinates: 45°35′12″N 8°51′06″E
- Country: Italy
- Province: Varese
- Municipality: Busto Arsizio

Population (2011)Istat data based on the territorial definition provided by municipal urban planning tools (see
  - Total: 6,345
- Demonym: Borsanesi

Borsano (Bursàn in Bustocco) is a frazione of 6,345 inhabitants in the municipality of Busto Arsizio in the province of Varese. Until 1928 it was always an autonomous municipality, apart from in the period between 1869 and 1912.

== Etymology ==
The suffix -ano (in Latin -anum) in the name "Borsano" could be one of the clues to its Roman origin. The Roman presence is supported by some authoritative evidence.

The name Borsano is also used for one of the frazioni of the municipality of Calestano, in the Province of Parma. According to a volume by Salavolti and Soragna, the Borsani or Borzani family name would have originated from this place. However, more recent studies claim the opposite. Martino Giovanni Maria Borsani (1406–1499), a relative of the Bishop of Parma Bertrando da Borsano (a Milanese family but originally from Borsano in Busto Arsizio), practiced as a notary in Calestano, where he acquired land and built a villa called Villa Borsana; around this villa, the hamlet of Borsano grew.

== History ==
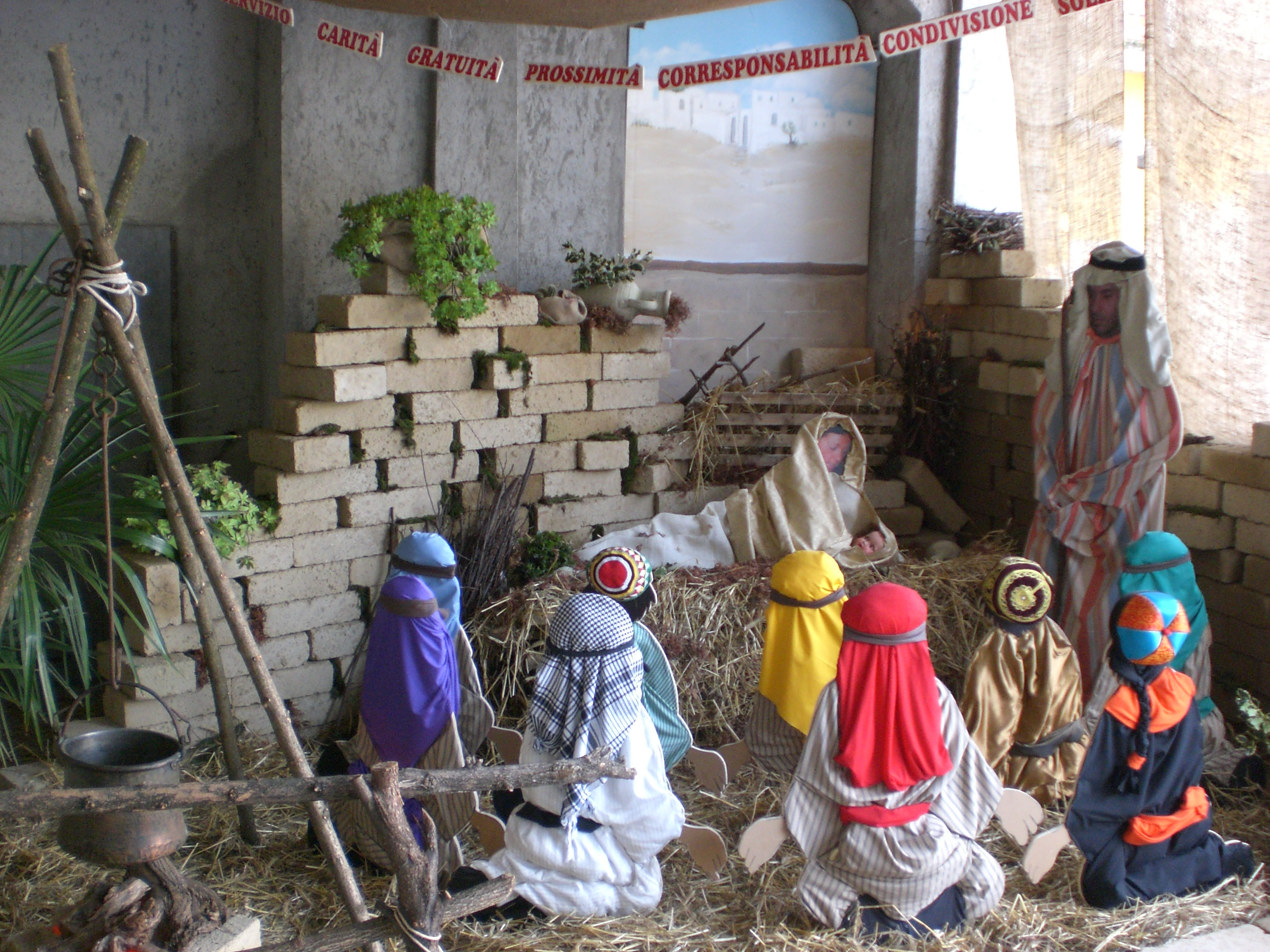
Nativity scene at Villa Rasini

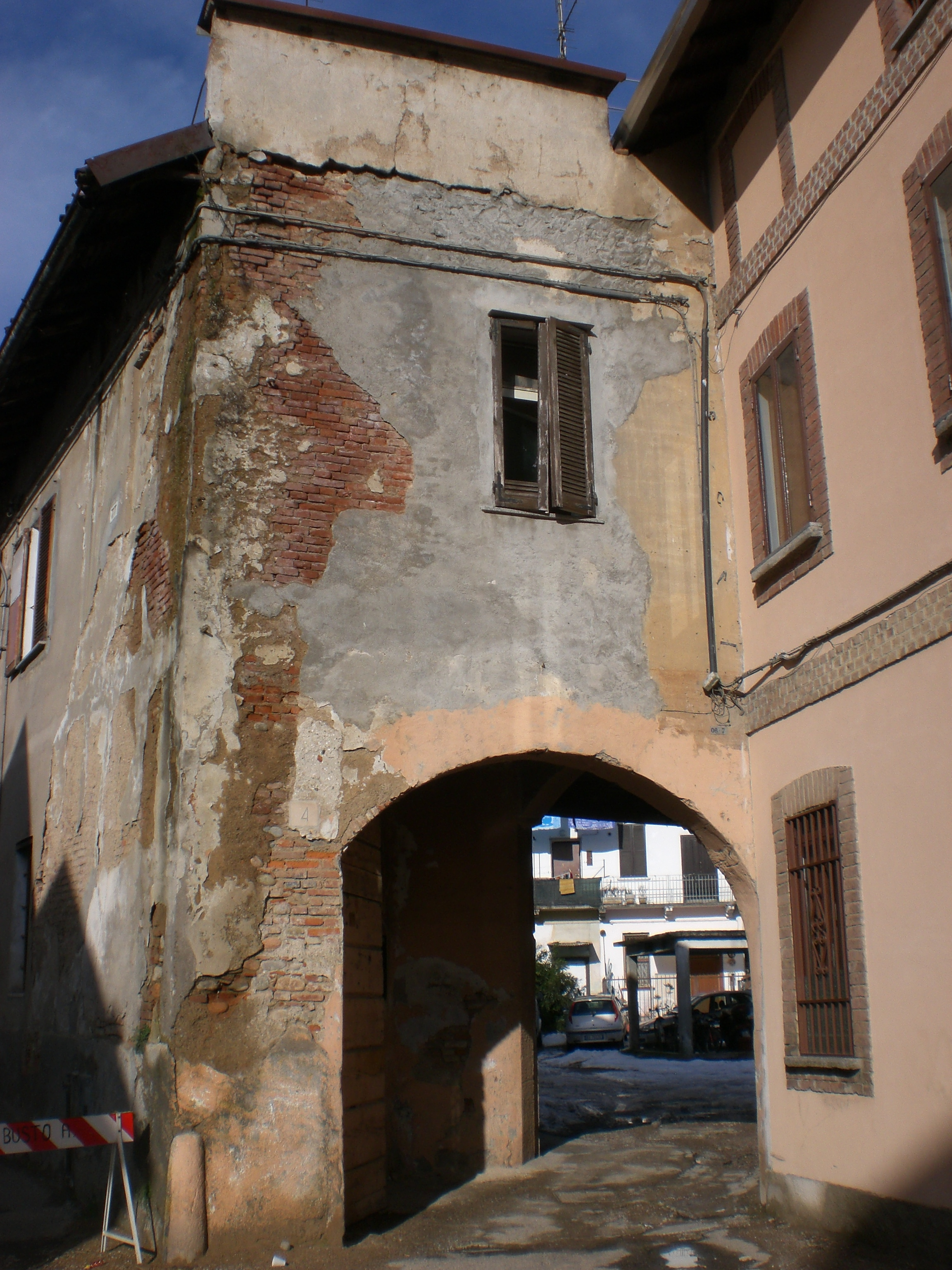
Porta Capuana

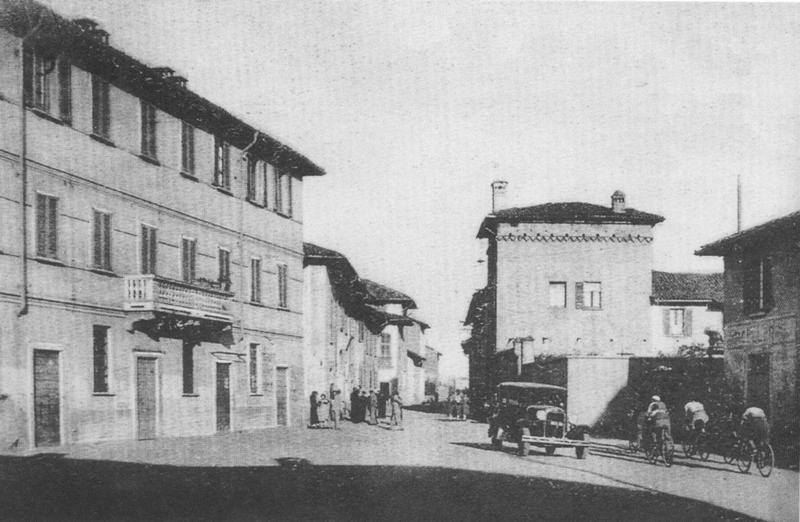
Piazza Toselli in 1900

In ancient times, its territory was divided into three cadastral municipalities: Borsano (the dominant municipality), Custode, and Rasino.

In the Middle Ages, Borsano (Brossianum) was part of Pieve di Dairago. Administratively, it belonged to Contado della Burgaria, one of the four contadi into which the Duchy of Milan was divided, and with it, it was included in the fief that Emperor Frederick Barbarossa granted on 9 June 1164 to Rainald of Dassel, Archbishop of Cologne and Archchancellor of the Holy Roman Empire. It was precisely here, in the countryside between Busto Arsizio and Borsano (or, according to other sources, between Borsano and Legnano), that the initial phases of the famous Battle of Legnano were fought between the fearsome German emperor and the Lombard communes.

In 1670, the archdeacon of the metropolitan church of the city of Milan, Giovanni Rasini, purchased Borsano for approximately 10,000 lire. Borsano was thus a fief of the princes Rasini for decades. At the behest of Prince Carlo Rasini, between 1717 and 1719, a church dedicated to the Portuguese Franciscan friar St. Anthony of Padua was built next to his villa, which was restored in 2007.

The Catasto Teresiano, with its surveys of 1722, provides a detailed overview of the territory. The village bordered to the north with the then-independent municipality of Sacconago, to the northeast with Brughetto (an independent municipality until 1730, when it was annexed to Sacconago) and Castellanza, to the east with the borough of Legnano, to the south with Dairago, and to the west with the former independent municipality of Bienate (later annexed to Magnago). The parish church marked the southern boundary of the settlement.

In 1853, Borsano, a municipality with a population of 1,093 inhabitants, was included in the XI district of Cuggiono. In 1861, when the Kingdom of Italy was established, the municipality had a population of 1,150 inhabitants. Borsano was an autonomous municipality until 1869, when it was aggregated with the municipality of Sacconago. On December 12, 1912, the municipality of Borsano was reconstituted and remained autonomous until 1928, when it was finally united with Busto Arsizio. At the 1931 census, the resident population was 2,413. Two years later, the residents had decreased to 2,011.

In the 1950s and 1960s, the "Giuliani e Dalmati" neighborhood was built in the northern part of the territory, so named because it was intended to house about two hundred Italian exiles from the lands of Istria, Venezia Giulia, and Dalmatia in the post-World War II period. Many families of exiles came to live in this area of Borsano, which is configured as a semi-independent neighborhood, equipped with shops, services, and schools (Rossi elementary school and Parini middle school). In honor of the exiles' places of origin, streets and roads were named after symbolic places of the ceded lands. There are also some statues erected to Saint Blaise, dear to the Istrian-Dalmatian culture. Today, a significant number of families of Istrian, Julian, and Dalmatian origin still live in the "village," a strong testimony in the city of this historical period. Later, migratory waves from Libya joined the neighborhood, and, more recently, from Eastern Europe, further characterizing the village as multicultural and with inhabitants deeply tied to the homeland. The memory of the Foibe massacres remains particularly vivid, and every year conferences and testimonies on this topic are organized.

== Monuments and places of interest ==
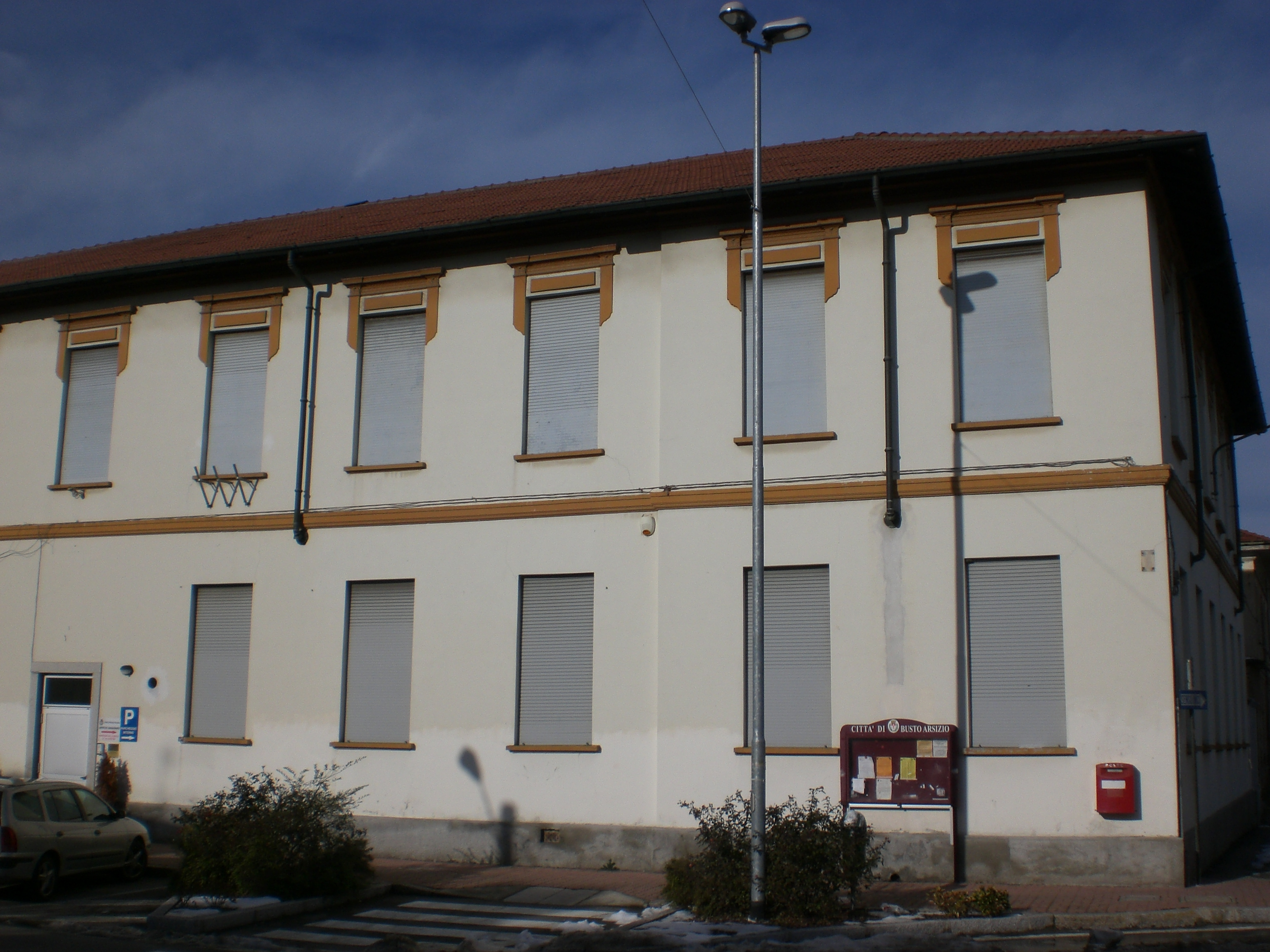
Former Marconi school building

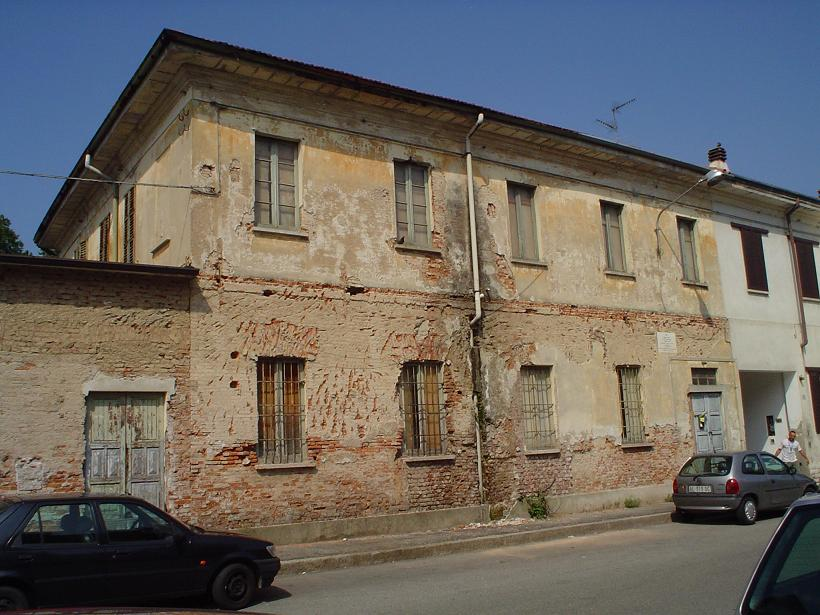
Former Borsano municipal building before restoration

Although it is currently a neighborhood of Busto Arsizio, Borsano was an independent municipality for centuries. Despite being a modestly sized village, it was largely self-sufficient in many respects. The building that served as the municipal headquarters for years, later a kindergarten, and abandoned for decades, underwent a building renovation and has now become the "Casa della Salute," a polyclinic also managed by the Italian Red Cross. Thanks to the renovation, the building is now equipped with energy-saving technologies, earning it a Class A rating. Adjacent to this building is the former Marconi school, the historic elementary school of Borsano, now partially used as municipal offices and partially as a detached section of other school complexes.

There are several buildings of historical, architectural, or artistic interest in Borsano, although some of the most significant works of this heritage, such as the 19th-century parish church and the 14th-century Santa Maria dei Restagni church, were demolished during the last century. Previously, another of Borsano's treasures had been lost: the elegant and extensive Italian garden of Villa Rasini, the residence of the noble feudal lords of Borsano.

Despite this, the recent restoration of Sant’Antonio da Padova, the small 18th-century church commissioned by Count Carlo Rasini, is a sign of the desire to recover part of the architectural and artistic value that Borsano once boasted. Through the efforts of the "Gruppo Ricerche Storiche" of Borsano, a painting depicting the Risen Christ by Giovanni Battista Crespi, known as Il Cerano, was rediscovered and exhibited in 2005 at a monographic exhibition dedicated to him at Palazzo Reale in Milan.

=== Religious architecture ===
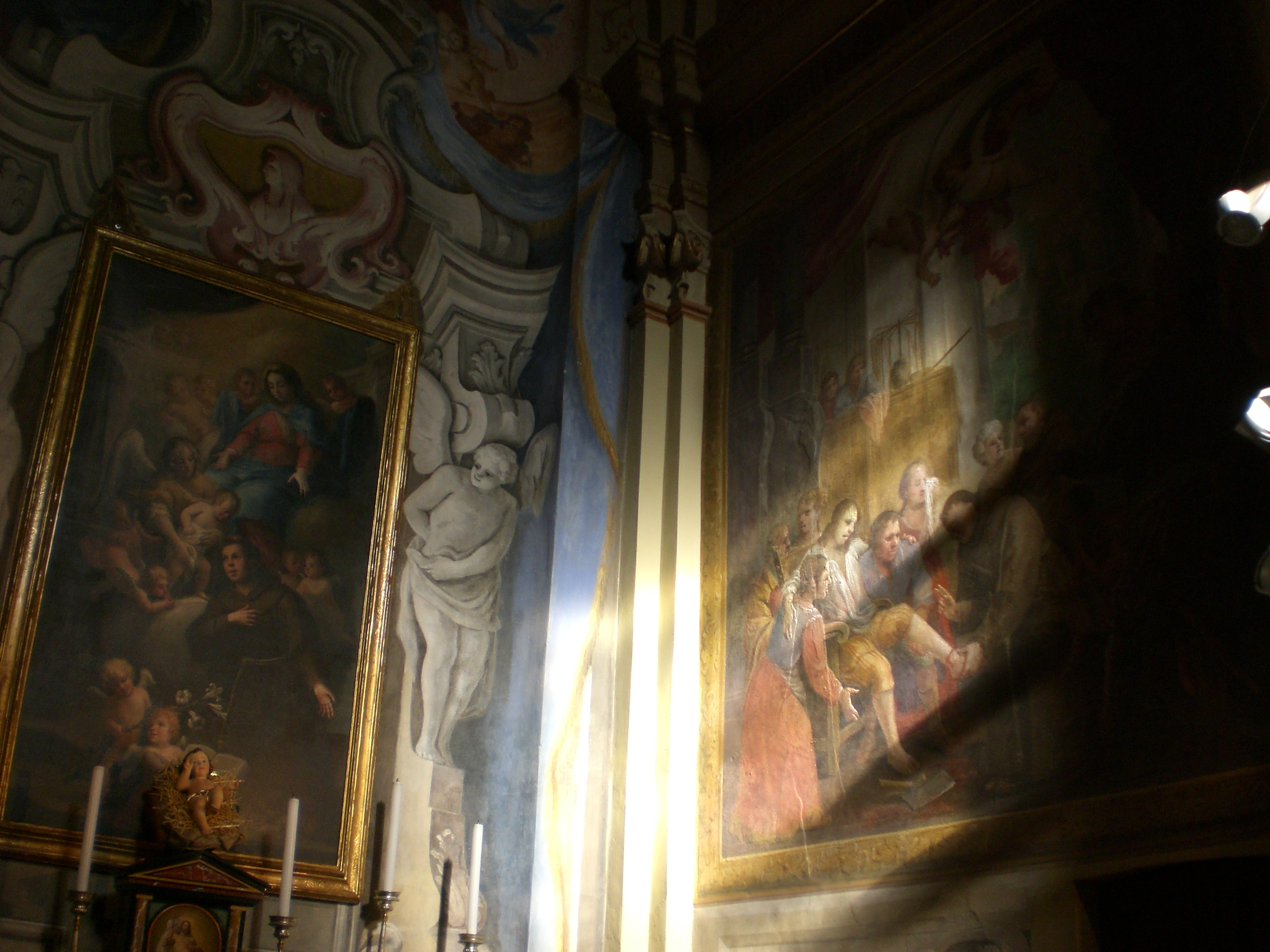
Church of Sant’Antonio da Padova, detail

The most notable buildings in Borsano for their history, architecture, and the artworks they preserve are undoubtedly the two churches: the parish church and the Church of Sant’Antonio da Padova. This reflects the fact that the Borsano community has had the church as its vital center for centuries. Religious life, from the Middle Ages until a few decades ago, was the cornerstone of the Borsano community. A concrete and relatively recent example of this fact comes from the reports sent to the Curia by parish priests Don Antonio Gallarini (1900) and Don Enrico Ballabio (1919). In the first it is attested that only three men had not communicated the previous Easter. In the second the balance is seven men and one woman.

Another sign of Borsano's religious fervor is the confraternities, a form of supra-family association that sometimes had charitable aspects. The two main confraternities in Borsano were that of the Holy Rosary (documented since 1570) and that of the Blessed Sacrament. Mass participation is documented until the early 20th century.

Among the existing buildings, in addition to the parish church and the one dedicated to Sant’Antonio da Padova, the cemetery and the oratory, founded in 1911, are noteworthy.

==== Church of Saints Peter and Paul ====
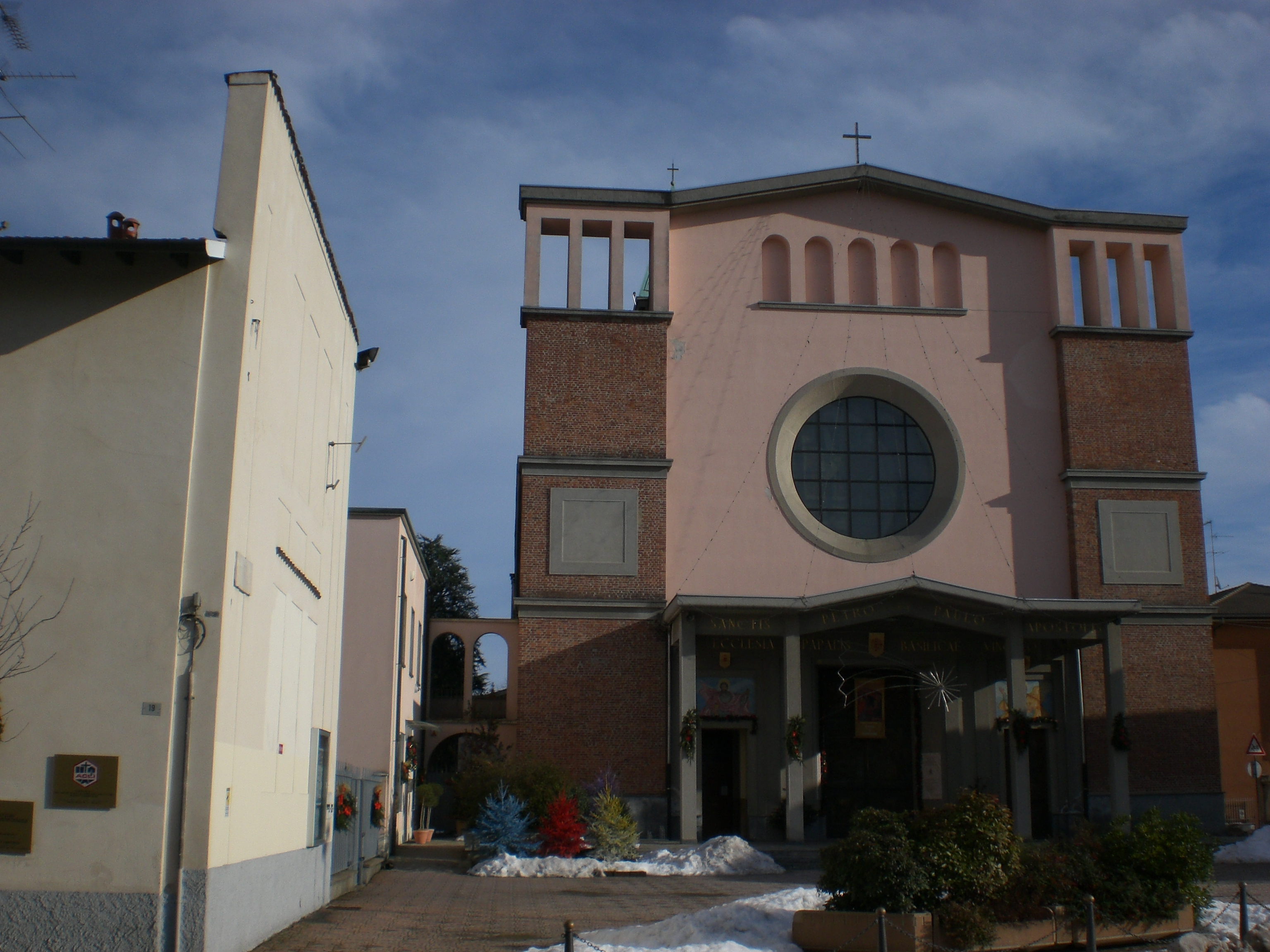
Parish church of Borsano

The parish church of Borsano is located in Piazza Don Antonio Gallarini and was built starting in 1939 on land adjacent to where the 19th-century building stood, blessed in 1825 and demolished in 1943. The latter had replaced the old 16th-century church, demolished in 1817. The new church was consecrated on 17 October 1942 by Cardinal Ildefonso Schuster, in the midst of World War II.

The project was designed by engineer Garavaglia and architect Ascani. The tripartite facade foreshadows the three internal naves. The main altar is the work of architect Ascani. The organ, from the demolished 19th-century church, was built by Antonio De Simoni Carrera in 1885 and restored in 1992 by the V. Mascioni family of Cuvio.

The Via Crucis and the counter-facade, from 1987 and 1993 respectively, are works by local artist Serena Moroni. The new stained glass windows of the nave are by Don Gaetano Banfi, while those of the presbytery and the facade's rose window are by Paolo Rivetta.

The three bronze portals are the work of sculptor Alberto Ceppi, who also created the mosaics on the facade and those in the apse.

The imposing square-based bell tower at the back of the church was erected in 1958, designed by architect Ascani, to replace the one from the 19th-century church, demolished in 1953. The bell set consists of nine bells, holding the Ambrosian record for a manual bell set.

==== Church of Sant’Antonio da Padova ====
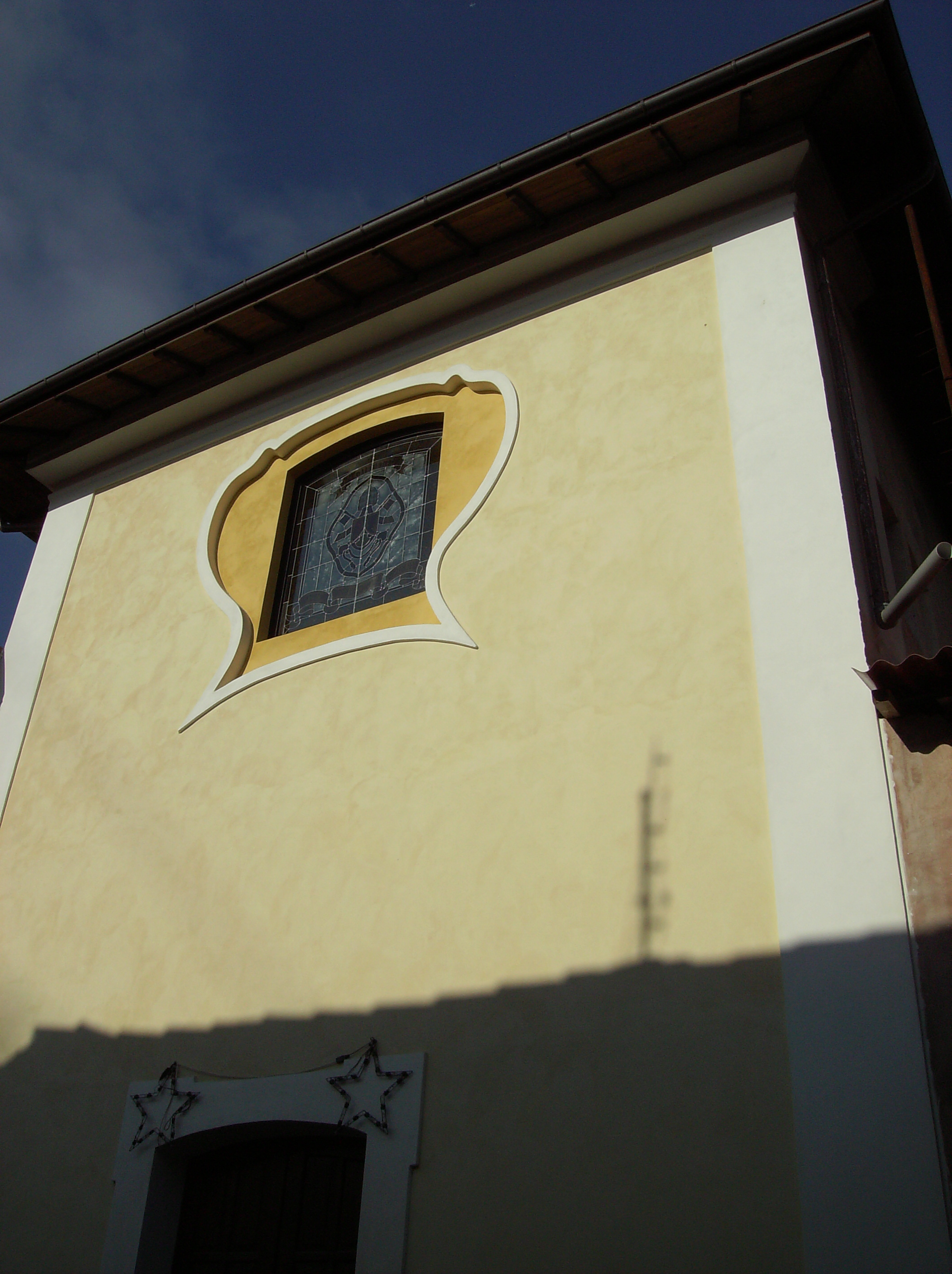
Church of Sant’Antonio da Padova

In the neighborhood's territory, there is also a second church, dedicated to Saint Anthony of Padua, the Franciscan Portuguese saint. The building, the most notable in Borsano both historically and architecturally, was commissioned by Count Carlo Rasini between 1717 and 1719, adjacent to his residence. The church was, in fact, a sort of private chapel: through a small window above the altar, the counts could attend Holy Mass directly from their Borsano residence.

In 1728, Carlo Rasini had a new altar erected in the church, dedicated to Saint Liborius, Bishop of Le Mans and patron saint against kidney stones. Until the early last century, the church of Sant’Antonio da Padova held the Aurora Mass, fulfilling the wishes of the Rasini family. The building also served as a place where people gathered to purchase silkworm eggs, which were then raised in Borsano households. Cocoons were also brought here.

Through the restoration of 2007, some remarkable frescoes emerged on the walls. The paintings can be attributed to the painter Giovanni Stefano Doneda Montalti Jr. The oil painting on canvas behind the altar depicts Saint Anthony, the Guardian Angel with the Child Jesus, and, higher up, the Madonna. The subject of the fresco on the left wall behind the altar is the miracle of the mule. The fresco on the right wall behind the altar depicts the miracle of the healed foot.

On the church's facade, there was a panel dedicated to the saint. By the 1960s, the colors had almost faded, and in 1985, the Club Folclore e Sport commissioned the Busto Arsizio painter Gigi Magugliani to create a new painting, which was placed in the original position. The panel was removed during subsequent restorations and could not be returned to its original position. In 2012, after a restoration commissioned by the Borsano Club to Giulia Lucarelli and Silvio Combi, the painting was placed inside a steel and glass structure, designed by architects Elena Colombo and Davide Candiani, and positioned at the intersection of Via Novara and Via 24 Maggio, in a flowerbed provided by Agesp, the former Busto Arsizio municipal company.

==== Church of Santa Maria dei Restagni (demolished) ====
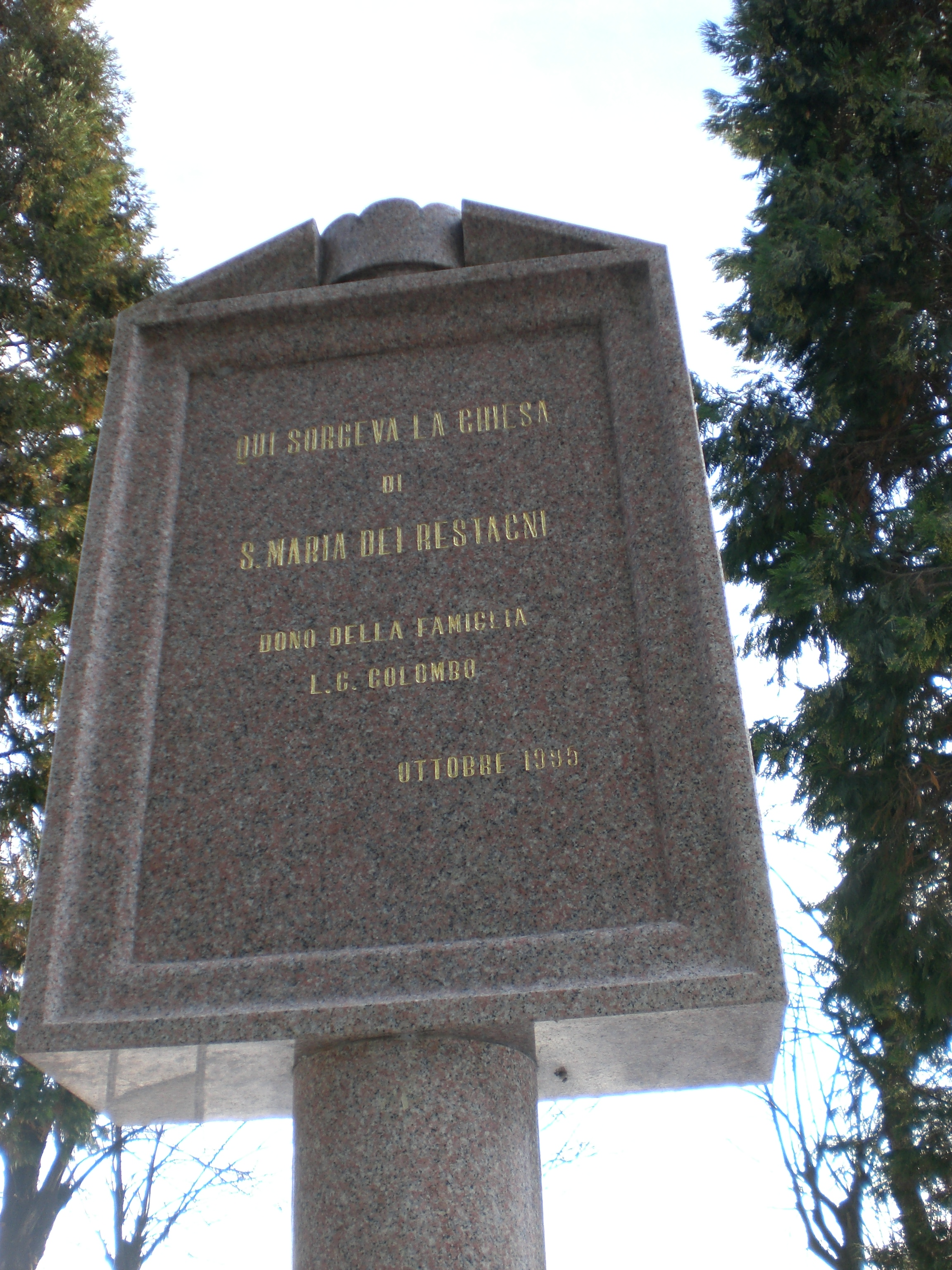
Plaque in memory of the demolished Santa Maria dei Restagni church

Another place of worship, from the 14th century, was located on the road to Villa Cortese: the rural church of Santa Maria dei Restagni, next to which the cemetery was later built. It featured paintings of sacred images on the walls. The bell tower had a single bell that called the faithful to sacred functions.

The Santa Maria dei Restagni church was demolished by the then-parish priest of Borsano, Don Ferdinando Oleari, in 1954 due to its poor structural condition. A park, dedicated in June 2009 to the former parish priest Don Ferdinando Oleari, was created on the land where it stood. At the center of the park, behind one of the images of the Madonna dell’Aiuto located in various parts of the city, a plaque commemorates the presence of the church.

==== Cemetery ====
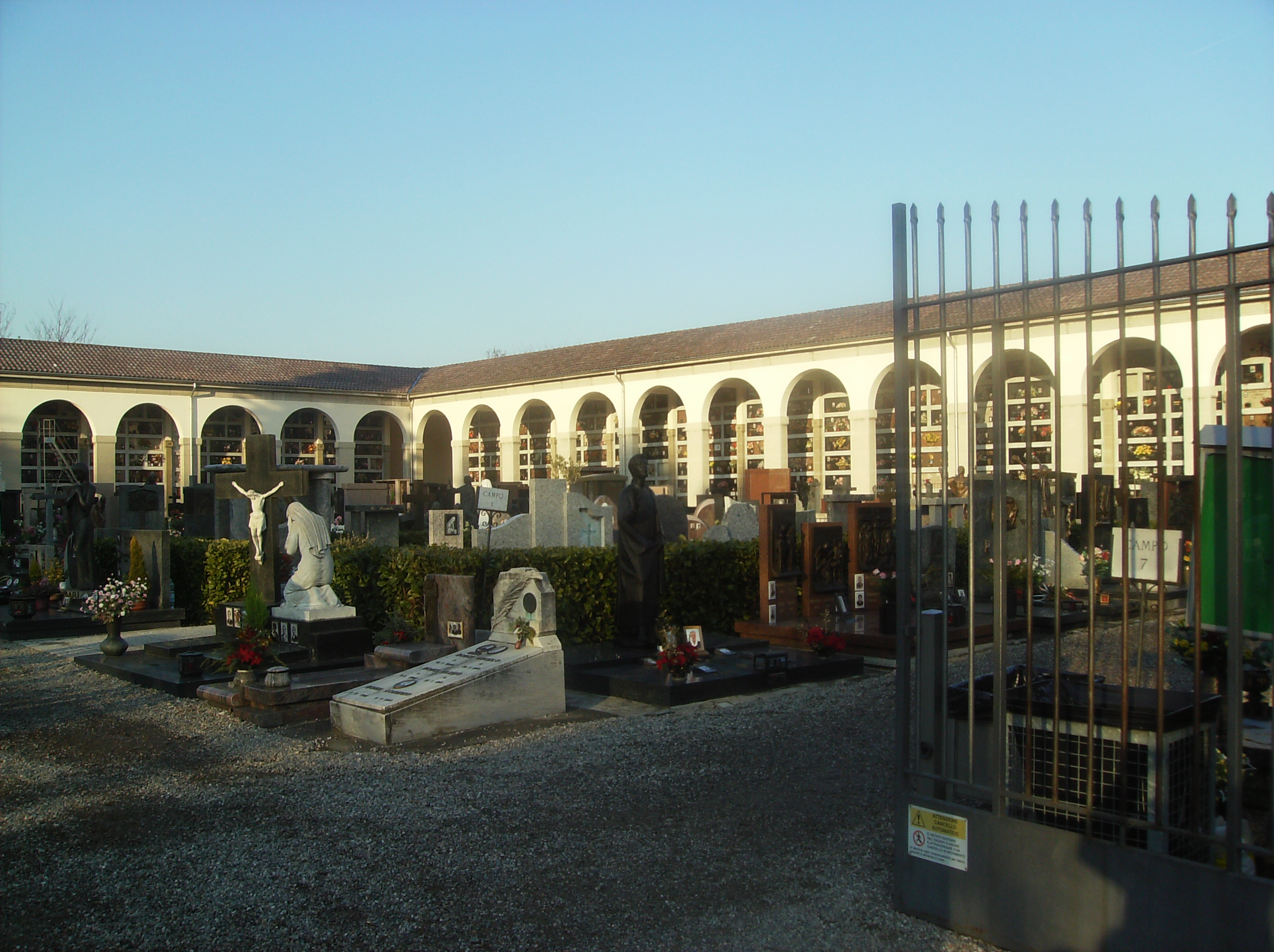
Cemetery of Borsano

The Borsano cemetery is one of the three cemeteries in the city of Busto Arsizio, and it is the smallest in size, covering 10,590 square metres (114,000 sq ft). It was likely built following the Edict of Saint-Cloud of 1804, which prohibited burials in inhabited areas. Previously, parish priests, priests, and prominent families were buried in the nave of the parish church. Other Borsano residents were buried in the adjacent cemetery.

The new cemetery was built near the parish church, close to the rural Santa Maria dei Restagni church, demolished in 1954. Following an expansion in 1928, the surface area nearly doubled.

On either side of the cemetery's entrance, on the inner side of the fence, are the tombstones of Ermenegilda ("Gilda") Rossi (a teacher in Borsano from 1858, whose plaque reads: "with 40 years of teaching, she spread with wise care and maternal affection the threefold love for God, Family, and Homeland") and Giuseppe Usuelli (born in Menzago or Vanzago around 1826 and died in Borsano in 1894, who named the Stelline, the orphans of Milan, as his universal heirs, and who receive a bouquet of flowers from them every year on All Souls’ Day).

In June 2008, the square in front of the main entrance was dedicated to Don Alessandro Bossi, a former parish priest, entrepreneur, and writer.

=== Civil architecture ===
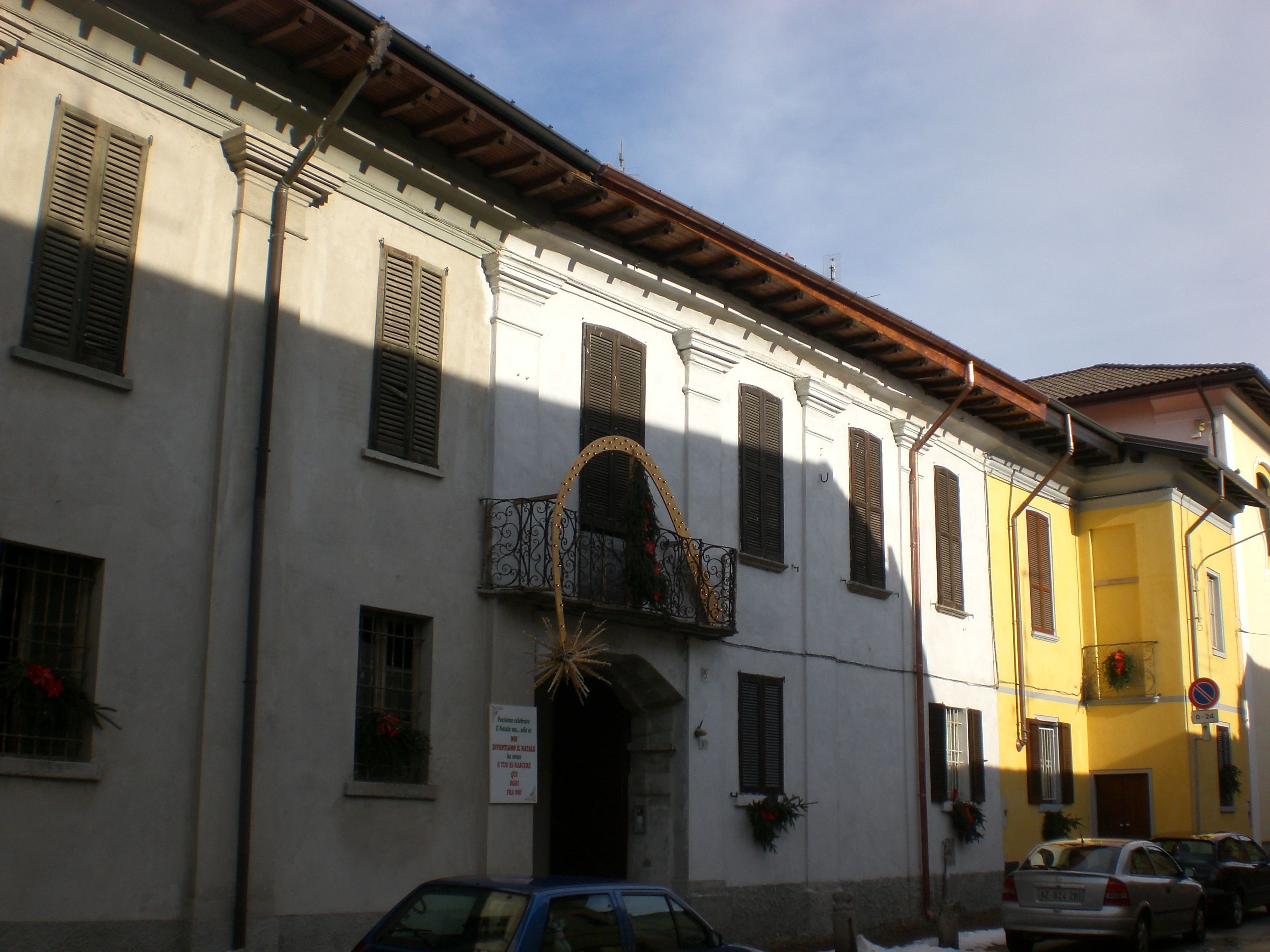
Villa Rasini and, in the background on the right, the Church of Sant’Antonio da Padova

Among the noteworthy buildings, there are not only the churches and the cemetery but also two civil buildings: a noble residence, the Renaissance villa of the Rasini counts (part of whose complex includes the Church of Sant’Antonio da Padova), and a peasant residence, Cascina Burattana, located in the northern part of the neighborhood.

==== Villa Rasini ====
Located in the center of the neighborhood, on the street dedicated to Cardinal Simone, a bishop of Borsano origin, the residence of the noble Rasini family was built toward the end of the 17th century by renovating a pre-existing farmhouse.

The transformation of the house into a noble residence occurred following the division of the Dairago fief by the Lozzetti and the subsequent purchase of the Borsano territory in 1666 by Giovanni Rasini, archdeacon of the Milan Cathedral, to whose heirs the residence remained tied.

In the 18th century, the villa was equipped with a private chapel, the current church of St. Anthony of Padua, located immediately east of the easternmost part of the facade.

The interior was once adorned with notable frescoes (some frescoes are still present), while on the rear side, there was a large Italian garden, divided into four parts by two orthogonal paths and embellished with mythological statues. Noteworthy are the wrought iron railings, still existing, and the pilasters that adorn the facade.

==== Cascina Burattana ====
This farmhouse, one of the last remnants of the agricultural heritage of the entire city of Busto Arsizio, is a multi-family peasant dwelling located for four centuries in the northern part of the Borsano neighborhood. It is a few hundred meters from Cascina Borghetto and was surrounded by vast fields cultivated with vines. Originally owned by a certain Turati Cristoforo, it was sold in the 19th century to the Bonomi brothers and subsequently to the noble Durini family of Gorla Minore. In the 1990s, it was purchased, along with its lands, by the municipality of Busto Arsizio. It was supposed to be restored as part of a project related to Expo 2015, but it remains in a state of disrepair.

== Economy ==
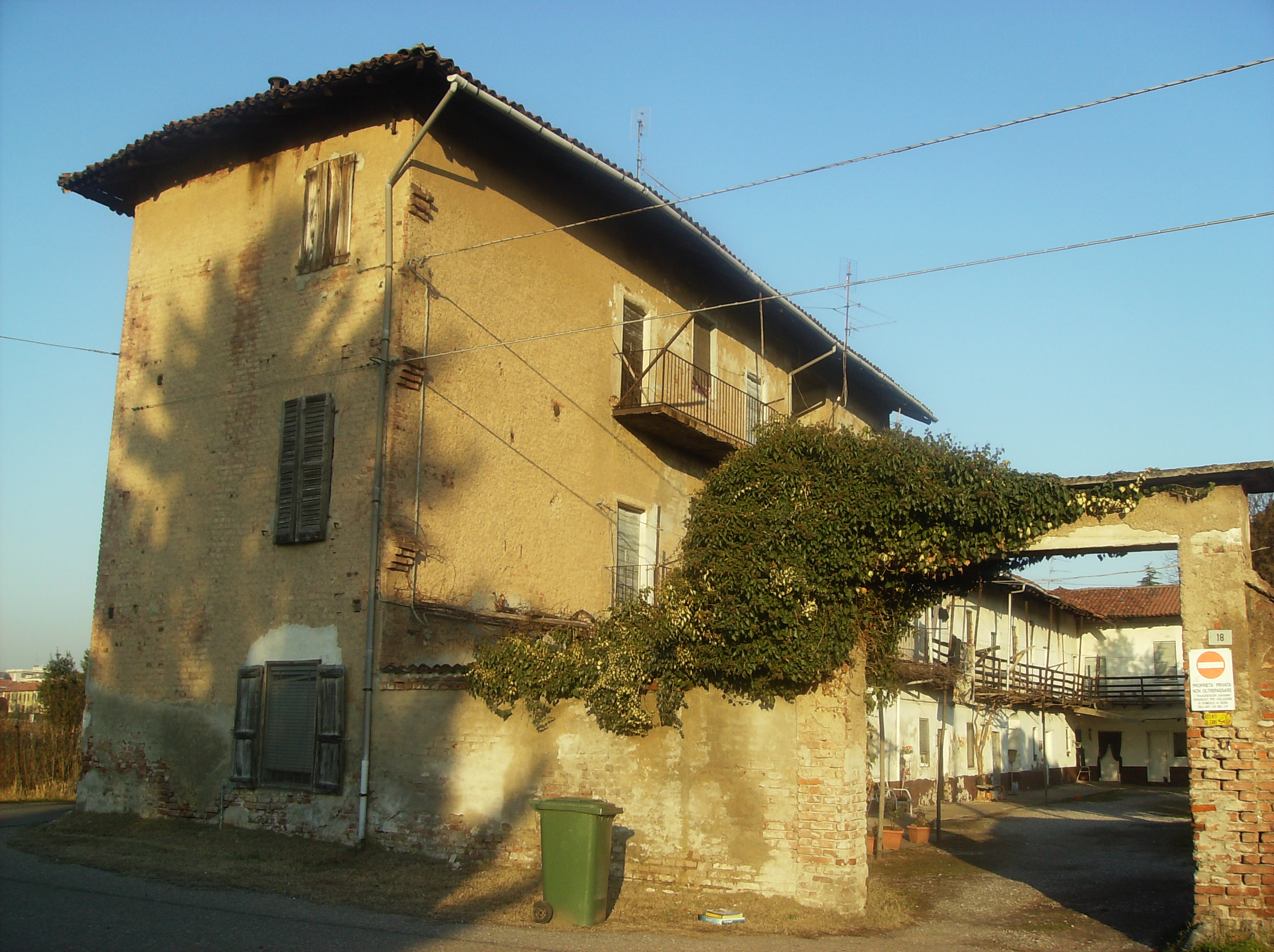
Cascina Burattana

Agriculture remained the predominant activity in Borsano until at least the 19th century.

One of the last remnants of Borsano's agricultural heritage is Cascina Burattana, a green corner located for four centuries in the northern part of the neighborhood. Farmers who worked in the fields surrounding the farmstead and the rest of the Borsano area supplemented their income by planting moroni, or mulberry trees, which were very common and greatly prized because their leaves were used to breed silkworms. In 1722 Borsano had 2,631 mulberry trees, while nowadays they have almost completely disappeared.

In the 19th century, after the Industrial Revolution, Borsano residents found work in the textile and mechanical industries of Busto Arsizio and surrounding areas, as well as in the local Baffa Textile Factory.

In June 2011, the planting of mulberry trees took place at Cascina Burattana, a first step toward the revival of this symbolic place of Borsano's agriculture.

== Notable residents ==
- Simone da Borsano, 100th archbishop of Milan from 1370 to 1380. Simone da Borsano was born in Milan to parents from Borsano.

== Bibliography ==
- Giulini, Giorgio (1856). Memorie spettanti alla storia, al governo ed alla descrizione della città e campagna di Milano nei secoli bassi [Memoirs Concerning the History, Government, and Description of the City and Countryside of Milan in the Early Centuries] (in Italian). Fratelli Colombo.
- Muratori, Lodovico Antonio (1868). Annali d'Italia: dal principio dell'era volgare sino all'anno MDCCXLIX, Volume 4 [Annals of Italy: From the Beginning of the Common Era to the Year 1749, Volume 4] (in Italian). Giachetti.
- Salavolti-Soragna (1903). Cenni storici sugli antichi pievati e castelli della diocesi parmense [Historical Notes on the Ancient Parishes and Castles of the Parma Diocese] (in Italian). Parma: Tipografia società operaia.
- Langè, Santino (1968). Pier Fausto Bagatti Valsecchi (ed.). Ville delle province di Como, Sondrio e Varese [Villas of the Provinces of Como, Sondrio, and Varese] (in Italian). Vol. Lombardia 2. Milan: Edizioni SISAR.
- Magni-Pacciarotti (1977). Busto Arsizio - Ambiente storia società [Busto Arsizio - Environment, History, Society] (in Italian). Busto Arsizio: Freeman editrice.
- Ferrario (1987). Notizie storico statistiche (ristampa anastatica, Busto Arsizio, 1864) [Historical-Statistical Information (anastatic reprint, Busto Arsizio, 1864)] (in Italian). Busto Arsizio: Atesa.
- Buisseret, David (1992). Monarchs, ministers, and maps: the emergence of cartography as a tool of government in early modern Europe. Chicago: University of Chicago Press.
- Rimoldi, Giovanni (1993). Borsano. Il millennio di una comunità [Borsano: A Community’s Millennium] (in Italian). Busto Arsizio: Industrial Foto.
- Rimoldi, Giovanni (1995). La colomba e il giglio [The Dove and the Lily] (in Italian). Busto Arsizio: New Industrial Foto.
- "Archivio storico lombardo" [Lombard Historical Archive]. Società storica lombarda (in Italian). 1997.
- Garavaglia (1997). Museo del Tessile e della Tradizione Industriale di Busto Arsizio [Museum of Textiles and Industrial Tradition of Busto Arsizio] (in Italian). Busto Arsizio: Freeman editrice.
- Predalli, Monica (2002). Novo, grande, coverto e ferrato: gli inventari di biblioteca e la cultura a Milano nel Quattrocento [New, Large, Covered, and Iron-Bound: Library Inventories and Culture in Milan in the 15th Century] (in Italian). Vita e Pensiero.
- Marti Escayol, MA; Espino López, A. (2013). Catalunya abans de la Guerra de Successió. Ambrosi Borsano i la creació d'un nova frontera militar, 1659-1700 [Catalonia Before the War of Succession. Ambrosi Borsano and the Creation of a New Military Frontier, 1659-1700] (in Catalan). Afers.
- Annali di storia moderna e contemporanea. Volume 9 [Annals of Modern and Contemporary History, Volume 9] (in Italian). Vita e Pensiero. 2003.
- Spada, Augusto (2004). Conoscere la città di/Getting to know the city of Busto Arsizio [Getting to Know the City of Busto Arsizio] (in Italian). Busto Arsizio: Freeman editrice.
- D'Ilario, Giorgio; Gianazza, Egidio; Marinoni, Augusto; Turri, Marco (1984). Profilo storico della città di Legnano [Historical Profile of the City of Legnano] (in Italian). Edizioni Landoni.
- Agnoletto, Attilio (1992). "La battaglia di Legnano è avvenuta nel territorio sangiorgese?" [Did the Battle of Legnano take place in Sangiorgese territory?]. San Giorgio su Legnano - storia, società, ambiente [San Giorgio su Legnano - History, Society, Environment] (in Italian). Edizioni Landoni.
