= Church of Santi Apostoli Pietro e Paolo, Borsano =

Roman Catholic Church in Borsano, Frazione of Busto Arsizio, Italy

Coordinates: 45.5860°N 8.8568°E

Church of Santi Apostoli Pietro e Paolo
- Church of Santi Apostoli Pietro e Paolo di Borsano
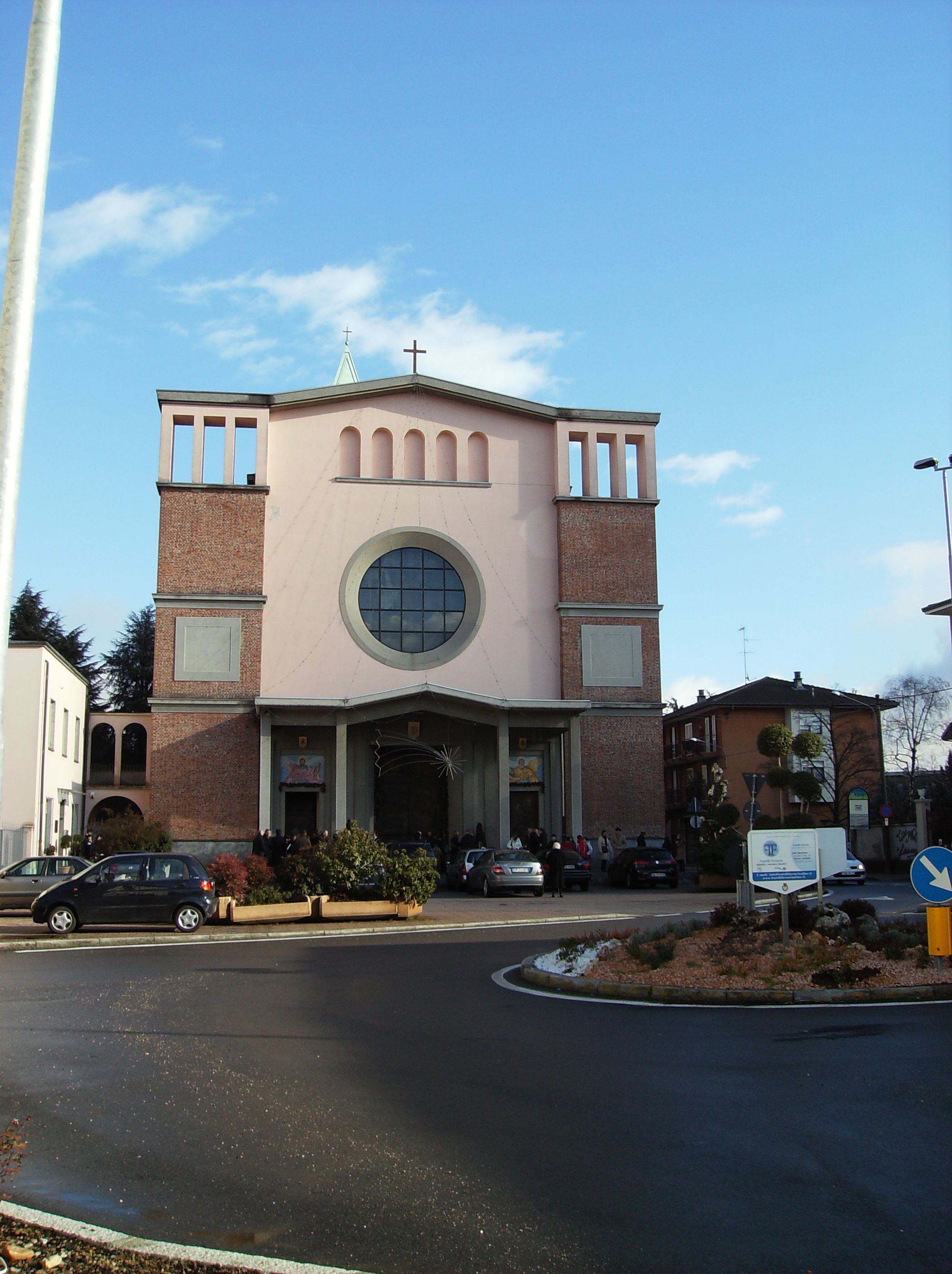
- Church of Santi Apostoli Pietro e Paolo
- Location: Borsano, Busto Arsizio, Lombardy
- Country: Italy
- Denomination: Roman Catholic

History
- Founded: 1300
- Dedication: Saint Peter and Saint Paul
- Consecrated: 1300

Architecture
- Style: Modern
- Years built: 1939–1942
- Demolished: 1508 (original church), 1817 (second church), 1943 (third church)

Administration
- Diocese: Diocese of Milan

The Church of Santi Apostoli Pietro e Paolo is a church located in Borsano, frazione of Busto Arsizio.

== History ==
=== Medieval church ===
Built in 1508, the medieval church replaced a previous church dedicated to Saint Peter, which in turn was constructed in c. 1300. It had two naves which were adjacent, and a chapel dedicated to Saint Sebastian. It had a bell tower which housed two bells and a sun dial. It was renovated in 1575. In 1817, by orders of then parish priest Santino Crespi, the church was demolished.

=== 19th-century church ===
The church was designed by Giacomo Moraglia, student of Giuseppe Zanoia, who, in 1817, shortly before his death, had been given the commission to design the new church. As such Zanoia only directed the demolition of the old structure. The church had a single nave, a small dome, and a bell tower, which was constructed in 1836. Construction of the church concluded in 1825, and was blessed on 23 October of that year. In 1879, the then parish priest Alessandro Bossi ordered the construction of a small portico in front of the main entrance of the church. He bought the organ of the church and commissioned Mosè Turri to finish the interior decorations, which due to a lack of funds had not been completed. Over 90 years after the completion of the new church, on 11 August 1906, the church was consecrated by Cardinal Andrea Carlo Ferrari. The church was demolished in 1943, after the new church was opened..

=== Current church ===
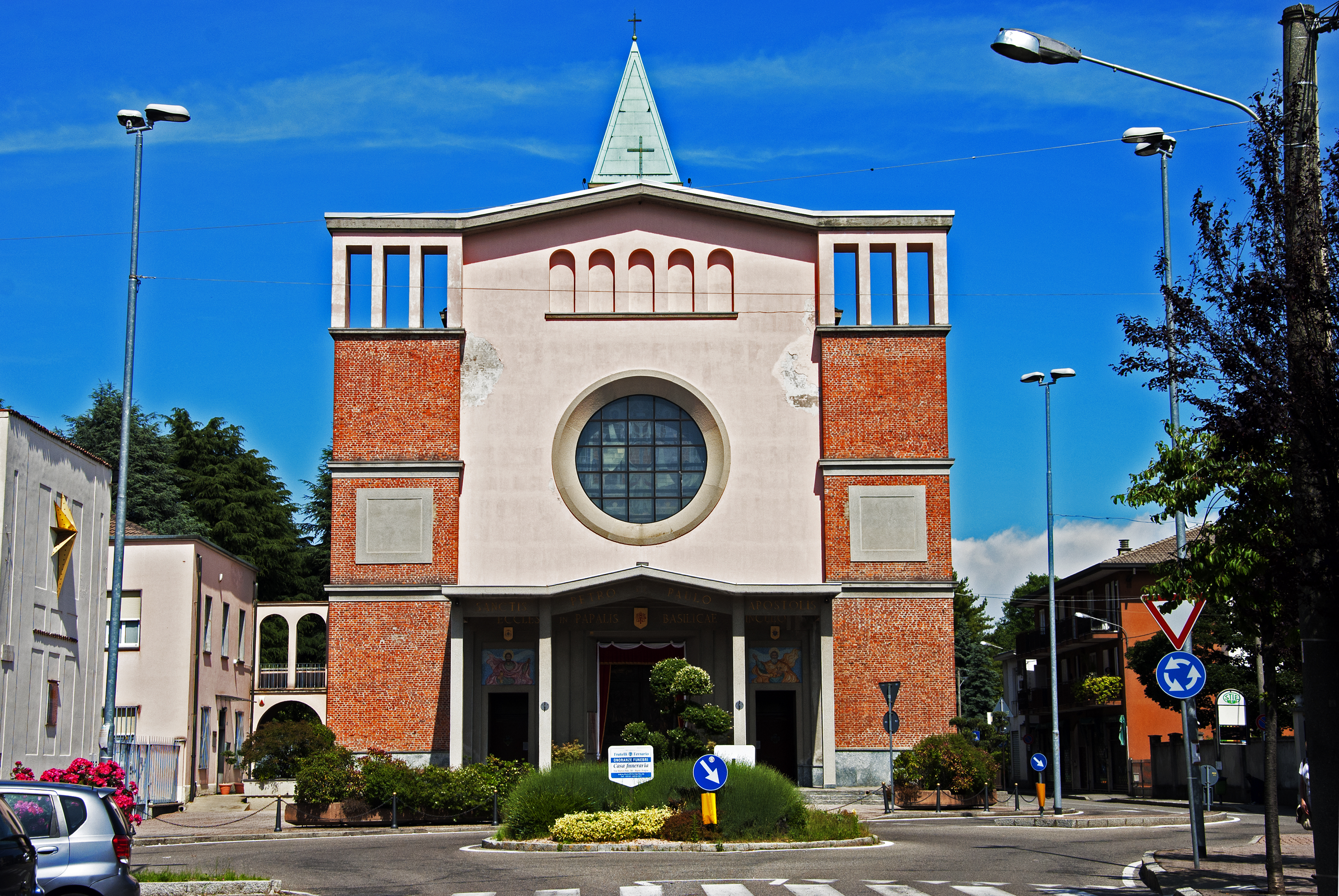
The current church

Construction of the current church began in 1939, and was built adjacent to the previous church. The church was constructed due to the demographic change in Borsano, and it is bigger than the previous structure, being able to accommodate over 2000 worshippers. The church was designed by the engineer Garavaglia and the architect Ascani, and was constructed in just 3 years. On 17 October 1942, in the midst of World War II, the new church was consecrated by Ildefonso Schuster, Archbishop of Milan.

== Architecture ==
=== Bell tower ===
The bell tower is located behind the apse of the church and was constructed after the demolition of the previous church in the 1950s. It is one of the tallest in Busto Arsizio and the only bell tower in Borsano.

=== Interior ===
The main altar was designed by Ascani. The organ was constructed in 1885 by Antonio de Simoni Carrera and restored in 1992 by the Mascioni family of Cuvio. It comes from the previous church. The via crucis was designed in 1987 by Serena Moroni. The windows were made by Don Gaetano Banfi, whereas the windows on the façade were made by Paolo Rivetta. Much of the interior was designed by Alberto Ceppi. The church houses one of the biggest thurible in the world, weighing 60kg when empty. It was built in 2012.
