= Marina Calloni =

Italian political philosopher (born 1958)

- Born: 1958 (age 67–68); Dairago, Italy

Academic background
- Education: University of Milan; University of Pavia; European University Institute

Academic work
- Institutions: University of Milano-Bicocca
- Main interests: Critical theory; Political philosophy; Gender-based violence; Public sphere

Marina Calloni (born 1958 in Dairago) is an Italian philosopher, full professor of Political and Social Philosophy at the University of Milano-Bicocca.

Her research fields include critical theory, gender-based violence, public philosophy, migration and digital society. She has worked with national, European and international institutions, among them the Italian Senate, the Council of Europe, the European Commission and the United Nations. She has carried out historical research on the Rosselli family and on the Giustizia e Libertà movement, editing previously unpublished writings, including the memoirs of Amelia Rosselli.

She founded and directs the research centre ADV – Against Domestic Violence and the academic network UN.I.RE. (Università In REte contro la violenza, "Universities Networked against Violence"), devoted to the implementation of the Istanbul Convention within the university system. These were the first bodies of their kind to be established in Italy.

== Education and early years ==
Calloni studied philosophy at the University of Milan. She obtained a doctorate in philosophy from the University of Pavia (1985) and a second doctorate in political and social sciences from the European University Institute in Fiesole (1992). She held a fellowship at the Goethe University Frankfurt under Jürgen Habermas.

== Academic career ==
She has been full professor of Political and Social Philosophy at the University of Milano-Bicocca since 2002, appointed on grounds of distinguished academic standing (chiara fama) under the national scheme for the return of Italian scholars working abroad. She was previously senior research fellow at the Gender Institute of the London School of Economics.

She held a visiting fellowship at the University of Notre Dame (2011) and the Alexander Bodini Fellowship at the Italian Academy for Advanced Studies of Columbia University (2020).

== Honours ==
- In 2020 the President of the Italian Republic, Sergio Mattarella, conferred on her the honour of Officer of the Order of Merit of the Italian Republic.
- President of the Italian Society for Critical Theory (since 2023).
- Vice-president of the Italian Society for Political Philosophy (2016–2022).

== Research ==
=== Critical theory ===
Calloni's work belongs to the tradition of critical theory and the Frankfurt School, with particular attention to gender inequality, domestic violence, digital capitalism, migration and populism. Her edited works include the Italian editions of Il pensiero post-metafisico (Postmetaphysical Thinking), Laterza, 1991, and Nuovo mutamento della sfera pubblica e politica deliberativa (A New Structural Transformation of the Public Sphere and Deliberative Politics), Raffaello Cortina, 2023, by Jürgen Habermas. She co-founded the Italian Society for Critical Theory, which she has chaired since 2023.

=== Gender-based violence ===
Calloni has contributed to the establishment of gender-based violence as a field of research, university teaching and professional training in Italy, designing interdisciplinary and interprofessional activities on the subject. Her research has been linked to advisory roles with the Parliamentary Commission of Inquiry into Femicide and All Forms of Gender-Based Violence of the Italian Senate, and to work with the Council of Europe on the implementation of the Istanbul Convention. In its 2020 baseline evaluation report on Italy, the GREVIO Group of Experts cited the UN.I.RE. academic network as an example of good practice.

=== The Rosselli family and the history of anti-fascism ===
Since the 1990s Calloni has worked on the anti-fascist tradition associated with the Rosselli family, on liberal socialism and on the Giustizia e Libertà movement, editing previously unpublished material including the Memorie (Memoirs) of Amelia Rosselli (il Mulino, 2001) and the correspondence between the Rosselli and Ferrero families (Feltrinelli, 1997).

== Selected publications ==
- Calloni, Marina (2025). "Polarization and Enmity in the Algorithmic Age". Philosophy and Social Criticism. 51 (4): 672–692.
- Calloni, Marina (2023). "Legitimizing Political Power from Below". Philosophy and Social Criticism. 49 (5): 581–598.
- Calloni, Marina, ed. (2023). Pandemocrazia. Conoscenza, potere e sfera pubblica nell'età pandemica (in Italian). Bologna: il Mulino. ISBN 978-88-15-38267-2.
- Habermas, Jürgen (2023). Calloni, Marina (ed.). Nuovo mutamento della sfera pubblica e politica deliberativa (in Italian). Milan: Raffaello Cortina. ISBN 978-88-3285-582-1. Reviewed in
- Agnello Hornby, Simonetta; Calloni, Marina (2013). Il male che si deve raccontare. Per cancellare la violenza domestica (in Italian). Milan: Feltrinelli. ISBN 978-88-07-49150-4.
- Galligan, Yvonne; Clavero, Sara; Calloni, Marina (2007). Gender Politics and Democracy in Post-Socialist Europe. Opladen: Barbara Budrich. ISBN 978-3-86649-133-5. Reviewed in
- Rosselli, Amelia (2001). Calloni, Marina (ed.). Memorie (in Italian). Bologna: il Mulino. ISBN 978-88-15-08356-2.
- Calloni, Marina; Cedroni, Lorella, eds. (1997). Politica e affetti familiari. Lettere dei Rosselli ai Ferrero 1917–1943 (in Italian). Milan: Feltrinelli.
- Calloni, Marina; Früchtl, Josef, eds. (1991). Geist gegen den Zeitgeist. Erinnern an Adorno (in German). Frankfurt: Suhrkamp.
- Habermas, Jürgen (1991). Calloni, Marina (ed.). Il pensiero post-metafisico (in Italian). Rome-Bari: Laterza. ISBN 978-88-420-7691-9.
