= Arconate =

- Comune
- Comune di Arconate
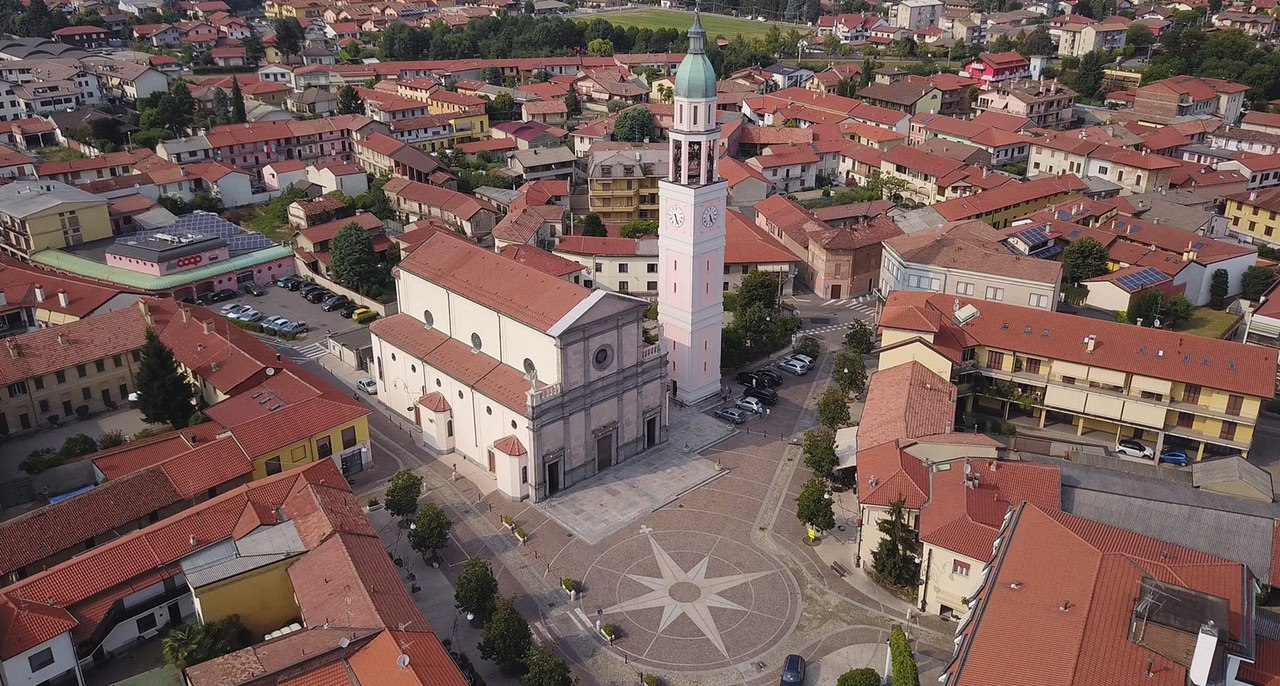
- View of Arconate

- Coat of arms

- Location of Arconate in Italy Arconate (Lombardy)
- Coordinates: 45°32′N 8°51′E
- Country: Italy
- Region: Lombardy
- Metropolitan city: Milan (MI)

Government
  - Mayor: Mario Mantovani (Forza e Coraggio)

Area
  - Total: 8.3 km^{2} (3.2 sq mi)
- Elevation: 180 m (590 ft)

Population (31 December 2004)
  - Total: 5,871
  - Density: 710/km^{2} (1,800/sq mi)
- Demonym: Arconatesi
- Time zone: UTC+1 (CET)
  - Summer (DST): UTC+2 (CEST)
- Postal code: 20020
- Dialing code: 0331
- Website: Official website

Arconate (Lombard: Arconaa [arkuˈnaː] or el Conaa [el kuˈnaː]) is a comune (municipality) in the Metropolitan City of Milan in the Italian region Lombardy, located about 25 kilometres (16 mi) northwest of Milan.

Arconate borders the following municipalities: Dairago, Buscate, Busto Garolfo, Inveruno, Cuggiono. Arconate is a twin with the city of Lennik in Belgium.

== History ==
The territory on which Arconate currently stands was inhabited in ancient times by the Ligurians, who then left room for the Celts during the fifth century BC. A trace of the Ligurian origin would still be found in the phonetics of the local dialect; the conservation of these features is justified by the remoteness of the ancient village from larger centers and from the main roads. Like all of Cisalpine Gaul, this area was also conquered in the third century BC. by the Romans, who revolutionized the territorial organization: they divided the agricultural fields with an orthogonal line formation and likewise did for the construction of roads and paths, on the model of the topography of military camps
