= Giovanni Zaro =

Italian footballer

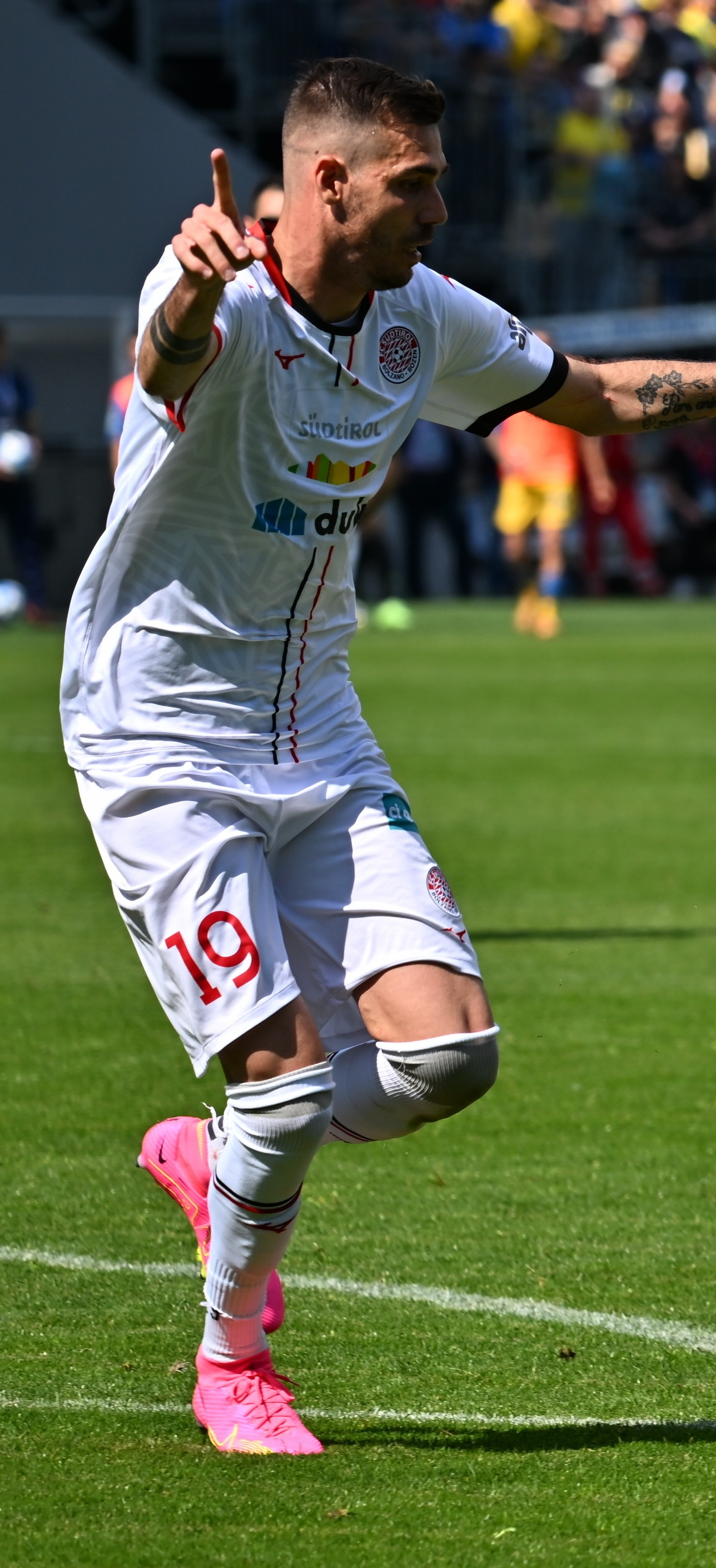
- Zaro in 2023

Personal information
- Date of birth: 12 May 1994 (age 32)
- Place of birth: Vanzaghello, Italy
- Height: 1.93 m (6 ft 4 in)
- Position: Centre back

Team information
- Current team: Ravenna
- Number: 24

Youth career
- –2012: Pro Patria
- 2011–2012: → AlbinoLeffe (loan)
- 2012–2014: Inter Milan

Senior career*
Years	Team	Apps	(Gls)
2013–2015	Inter Milan	0	(0)
2013–2014	→ Castiglione (loan)	4	(0)
2014–2015	→ Pro Patria (loan)	5	(0)
2015–2019	Pro Patria	118	(11)
2019–2021	Modena	52	(2)
2021–2023	Südtirol	68	(5)
2023–2025	Modena	72	(4)
2025–2026	Cesena	36	(1)
2026–	Ravenna	0	(0)

International career^{‡}
2012	Italy U18	1	(0)
- * Club domestic league appearances and goals as of 13 May 2026 ‡ National team caps and goals as of 15 march 2012

Giovanni Zaro (born 12 May 1994) is an Italian professional footballer who plays as a centre back for Serie C Group B club Ravenna.

== Club career ==
Born in Vanzaghello, Zaro made his senior debut on 16 November 2013 for Serie C2 club Castiglione against Rimini, on loan from Inter Milan.

For the 2014–15 season, Zaro was loaned to Pro Patria, and signed for the club the next year. Zaro played more than 100 matches for the club in six seasons.

On 11 July 2019, he left Pro Patria and joined Serie C club Modena.

On 15 July 2021, Zaro joined Südtirol.

On 11 July 2023, he returned to Modena.

On 16 July 2025, Zaro signed a two-year contract with Cesena.

== International career ==
Zaro was a youth international for Italy.

== Honours ==
Pro Patria

- Serie D: 2017–18
