= Villa Cortese =

Villa Cortese Villa Cortesa (Lombard)
- Comune
- Comune di Villa Cortese
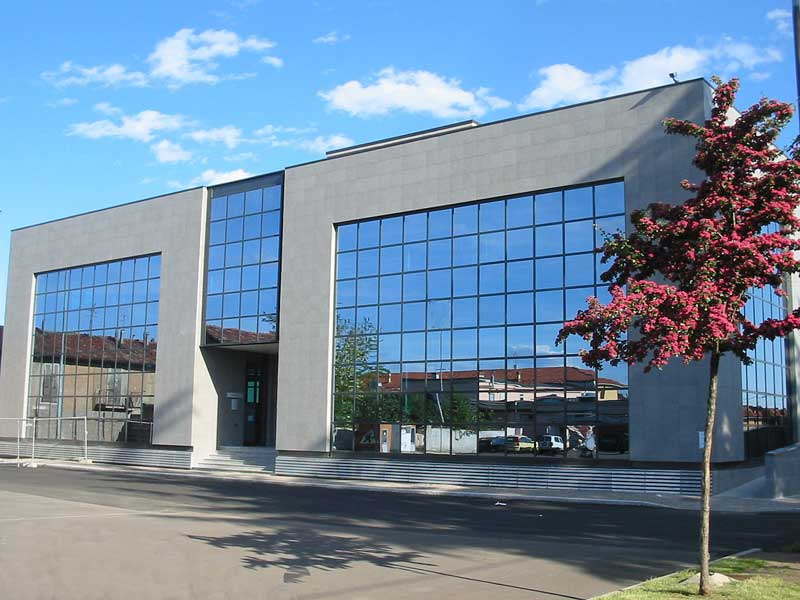
- Town hall

- Coat of arms

- Location within Italy Location within Lombardy
- Coordinates: 45°34′N 8°53′E
- Country: Italy
- Region: Lombardy
- Metropolitan city: Milan (MI)

Government
  - Mayor: Alessandro Barlocco

Area
  - Total: 3.6 km^{2} (1.4 sq mi)
- Elevation: 192 m (630 ft)

Population (1 January 2008)
  - Total: 6,122
  - Density: 1,700/km^{2} (4,400/sq mi)
- Demonym: Villacortesini
- Time zone: UTC+1 (CET)
  - Summer (DST): UTC+2 (CEST)
- Postal code: 20035
- Dialing code: 0331
- Website: Official website

Villa Cortese (Legnanese: Villa Cortesa [ˈʋila kurˈteːza]) is a comune (municipality) in the Province of Milan, in the Italian region Lombardy, located about 25 kilometres (16 mi) northwest of Milan.

The administrative municipalities borders Legnano, San Giorgio su Legnano, Busto Garolfo and Dairago.

== History ==
The name Villa Cortese the union between the words Vicus (Villa) indicating the very first settlement and Curtis (Cortese) that refers to the bordering settlements. The toponym has later on evolved to Vilcortex, Vilacortexia and lastly Villa Cortese.

The discovery of a Roman sarcophagus dating back to the 1st century AD testifies to a settlement on the territory since the Roman era; the sarcophagus is now in the Guido Sutermeister Civic Museum in Legnano. The first document in which the town is mentioned is an act of 1261, with which the Provost and the Canons of the Convent of San Giorgio (which was located where the Visconteo Castle in Legnano now stands) certify the assets they hold between the Olona river, Villa Cortese and the Strada Dairasca which connected Legnano with Dairago. Also in the thirteenth century, Goffredo da Bussero in the Liber Notitiae Sanctorum Mediolani lists an altar dedicated to St. Victor martyr in the Villa Cortese site.

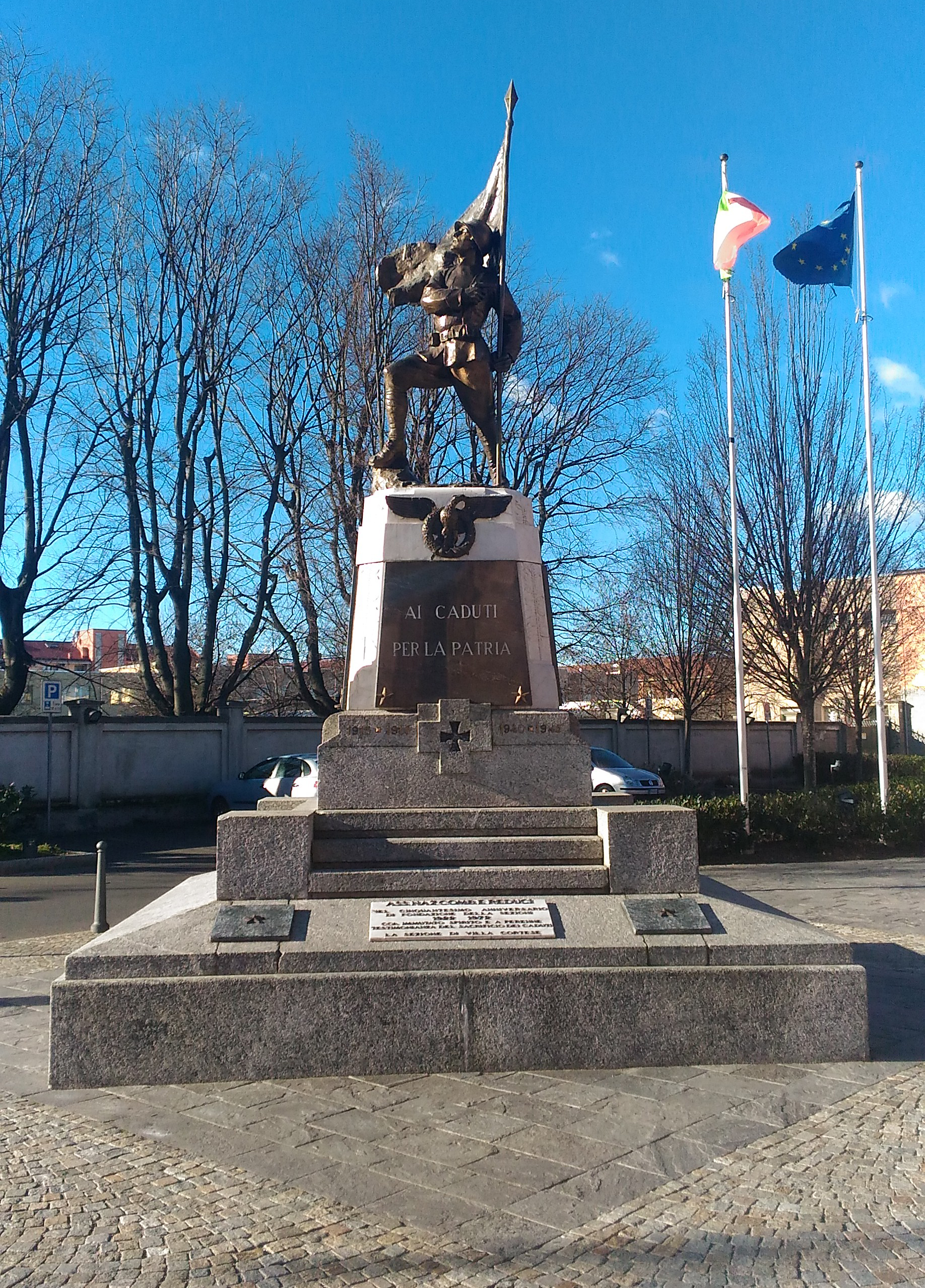
War memorial of Villa Cortese

A parchment dated 1312 mentions the Scazzosi family, powerful in the area and also having properties in the surrounding areas; an Ambrogio Scazzosi appears in the list of Merchants of fine wool with brand and registration number, dated 9 November 1403, living in Villa Cortese and dependent on the Parish of Olgiate Olona, in the Duchy of Milan. Suppressed by Napoleon who annexed it to Dairago, the Municipality of Villa Cortese was restored by the Austrians, but again abolished in 1868 by Victor Emmanuel II with the Royal decree 5192, which this time united it with Busto Garolfo, a neighboring and rival town. Municipal autonomy was finally restored almost a century later, on 13 October 1966. Villa Cortese was the birthplace of the comedian Giacomo Poretti of the trio Aldo, Giovanni e Giacomo, the well-known industrialist Franco Tosi and the painter Piero Giunni.

== Society ==
The connection with neighboring municipalities is made by Movibus bus lines. Among the first Italian recycling municipalities, for years it has stabilized its separate collection at around 70%. The municipal building is equipped with a photovoltaic system for the production of electricity and hot water, as well as the middle and elementary schools. Any type of disposal is possible at the municipal platform. It has eight well-equipped public parks and a day of cleaning the woods is organized by the municipal administration. The traditional fair takes place at the end of September, while the characteristic Christmas markets are held in mid-December.

=== Demographics ===
Historical population

Year	Pop.	±%
1861	820	—
1871	869	+6.0%
1881	971	+11.7%
1901	1,098	+13.1%
1911	1,540	+40.3%
1921	1,769	+14.9%
1931	2,164	+22.3%
1936	2,251	+4.0%

Year	Pop.	±%
1951	2,250	−0.0%
1961	3,609	+60.4%
1971	4,352	+20.6%
1981	5,195	+19.4%
1991	5,765	+11.0%
2001	6,113	+6.0%
2011	6,150	+0.6%

=== Administration ===
Political parties and mayors of Villa Cortese
Period		Mayor	Political party	Role
1988	1993	Alessandro Ubiali	Democrazia Cristiana	Mayor
1993	1997	Cristiano Cozzi	Lega Nord	Mayor
1997	2001	Bruno Dell'Acqua	Lista civica	Mayor
2001	2006	Bruno Dell'Acqua	Lista civica	Mayor
2006	2011	Giovanni Alborghetti	Lista civica Insieme per Villa	Mayor
2011	2016	Giovanni Alborghetti	Lista civica Insieme per Villa	Mayor
2016	In charge	Alessandro Barlocco	Lista civica Insieme per Villa	Mayor

== Culture ==
=== Education ===
==== Schools ====
- Kindergarten
- Primary School Giuseppe Pinciroli
- Middle School Papa Giovanni XXIII
- Technical institute (i.e. High School) Gregorio Mendel

== Sport ==
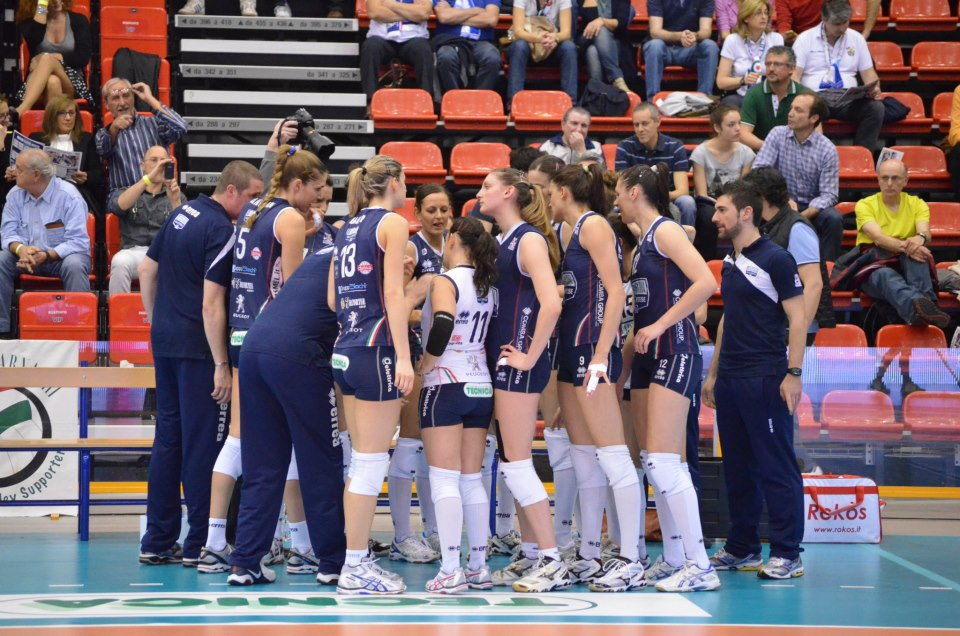
MC-PietroCarnaghi women's volleyball team

The name of Villa Cortese comes to the national sports news starting from the 2006–2007 season, when the MC-PietroCarnaghi, women's volleyball team, arrives from B2 to B1, the following year is promoted to A2 and in 2009 wins the playoff for enter the Serie A1. In 2010 the newly promoted to A1 won the Italian Cup, which she will repeat the following year. In the 2010–2011 season he made his debut in Europe in the Cev Champions League, reaching the semifinals the following season, as the smallest city ever to have succeeded. He faces his first three seasons of the championship as an absolute protagonist: two 2nd places and a 1st place in the regular season, three championship finals won, even touching the scudetto by one point, during the tie-break (5th set) of Race 5 of the 2011–2012 scudetto finals.
