= Magnago =

Magnago Magnagu (Lombard)
- Comune
- Comune di Magnago
- Coat of arms

- Location within Italy Location within Lombardy
- Coordinates: 45°35′N 8°48′E
- Country: Italy
- Region: Lombardy
- Metropolitan city: Milan (MI)
- Frazioni: Bienate

Government
  - Mayor: Carla Picco

Area
  - Total: 11.3 km^{2} (4.4 sq mi)
- Elevation: 197 m (646 ft)

Population (31 December 2010)
  - Total: 9,090
  - Density: 804/km^{2} (2,080/sq mi)
- Demonym: Magnaghesi
- Time zone: UTC+1 (CET)
  - Summer (DST): UTC+2 (CEST)
- Postal code: 20020
- Dialing code: 0331
- Website: Official website

Magnago (Legnanese: Magnagu [maˈɲaːɡu]) is a comune (municipality) in the Province of Milan in the Italian region Lombardy, located about 30 kilometres (19 mi) northwest of Milan.

Magnago borders the following municipalities: Samarate, Busto Arsizio, Vanzaghello, Dairago, Castano Primo, Buscate.
