= Castano Primo =

Castano Primo Càstan (Lombard)
- Comune
- Comune di Castano Primo
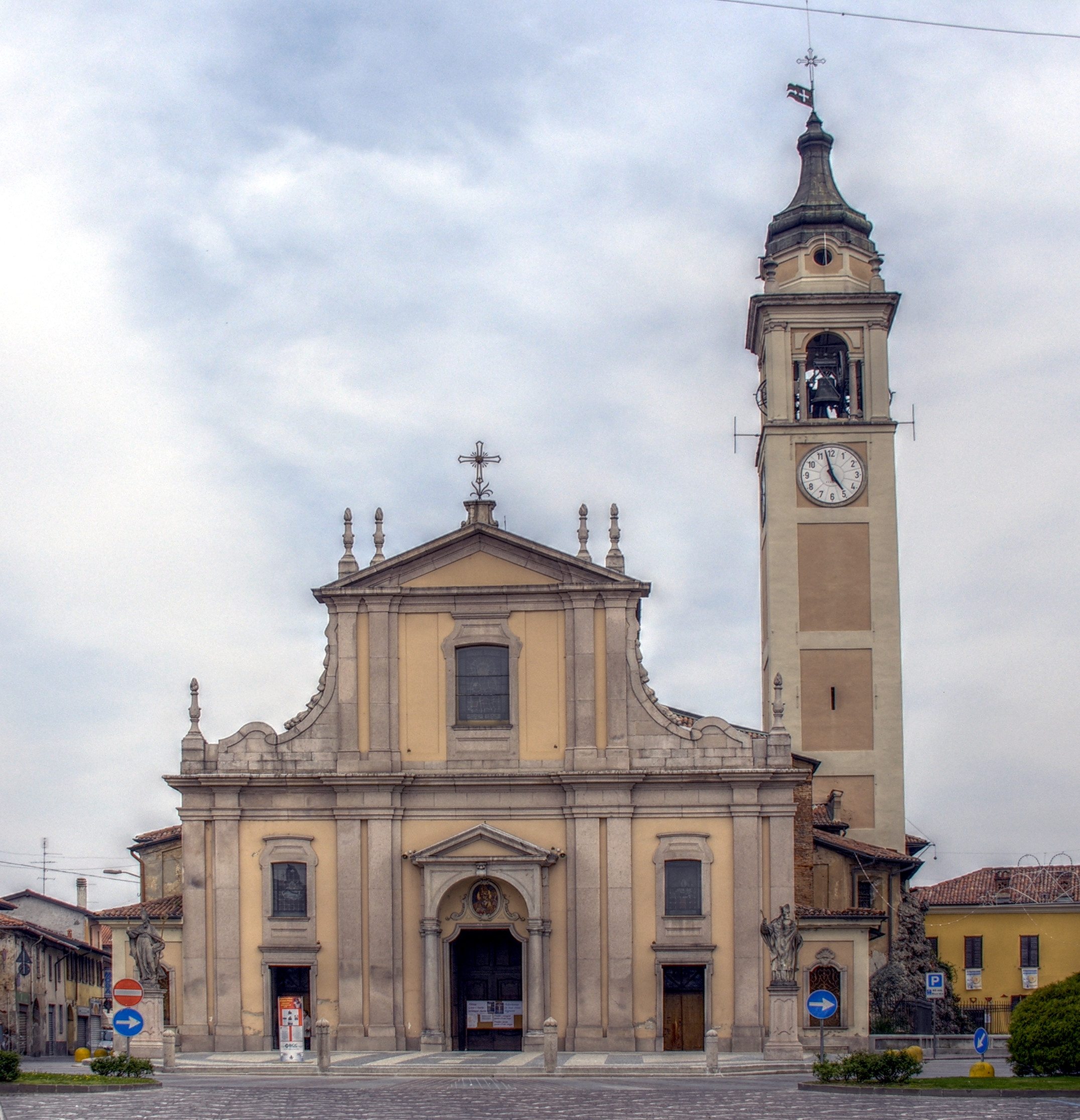
- Church of St. Zeno

- Coat of arms

- Location within Italy Location within Lombardy
- Coordinates: 45°33′N 8°46′E
- Country: Italy
- Region: Lombardy
- Metropolitan city: Milan (MI)

Government
  - Mayor: Giuseppe Pignatiello

Area
  - Total: 19.1 km^{2} (7.4 sq mi)
- Elevation: 187 m (614 ft)

Population (30 November 2017)
  - Total: 11,196
  - Density: 586/km^{2} (1,520/sq mi)
- Demonym: Castanesi
- Time zone: UTC+1 (CET)
  - Summer (DST): UTC+2 (CEST)
- Postal code: 20022
- Dialing code: 0331
- Website: Official website

Castano Primo (Italian pronunciation: [ˈkastano ˈpriːmo]; Milanese: Càstan) is a city and comune in Province of Milan, in the Italian region Lombardy, located about 35 kilometres (22 miles) northwest of Milan.

Castano Primo borders the following municipalities: Lonate Pozzolo, Vanzaghello, Magnago, Nosate, Buscate, Cameri, Turbigo, Robecchetto con Induno, Cuggiono. It received the honorary title of city with a presidential decree on October 11, 1984.

== History ==
Castano was initially a Roman village that subsequently came under the Burgaria of Parabiago. It was converted to a military fortress by the Counts of Biandrate, passing eventually to the House of Visconti. During internal struggles within the House of Visconti, Castano was pillaged. The fortress was rebuilt in the 14th century and ownership passed to the Archbishop. Various periods of struggle and domination by the Visconti followed until, in 1447, Castano came under the control of the House of Sforza who gave it as fiefdom to a family favourite. In the 16th century the war between the French and Spanish waged around the town but remained it under the control of the Viscount of Brignano until 1717. By 1604 the population of Castano was around 1500 people.

On 22 June 1636 Castano was nearly destroyed in the battle fought by the Spanish and Austrians against the French. With the end of the Brignano family, Castano came under Portuguese rule passing through the hands of various noble families, then was eventually conceded to the Austrians. From 1786 to 1791 Castano was part of the Province of Gallarate. With the end of Napoleonic rule, Castano again came under Austrian control.

In 1848 much of the population emigrated to the nearby Province of Piedmont to escape the repressive rule of the House of Habsburg. Following the Battle of Magenta in June 1859, Castano became part of Lombardy.

== Name ==
The name Castano most probably derives from the old "Silvae Castanae" (chestnut woods). Other sources suggest the original name was in fact "Castro Casteno", as town was close to a castle or other fortification. Those sources point to an ancient crest or shield of the town that depicts a red castle from which grows a leafy chestnut tree, still shown today on the stem of the current council. The suffix "Primo" was added by the then king, Victor Emmanuel II of Italy, by a decree dated 10 December 1863 to distinguish Castano from another town of the same name in the Province of Pavia.

== Main sights ==
- Church of St. Zeno of Verona, which also hosts the Santo Crocifisso (or Holy Cross) of Castano Primo.
- Church of Saint Jerome.
- Church of Saint Roch.
- Church of the Madonna of the Poor.
- Chapel of Madonna di Gree.
- Palazzo Rusconi

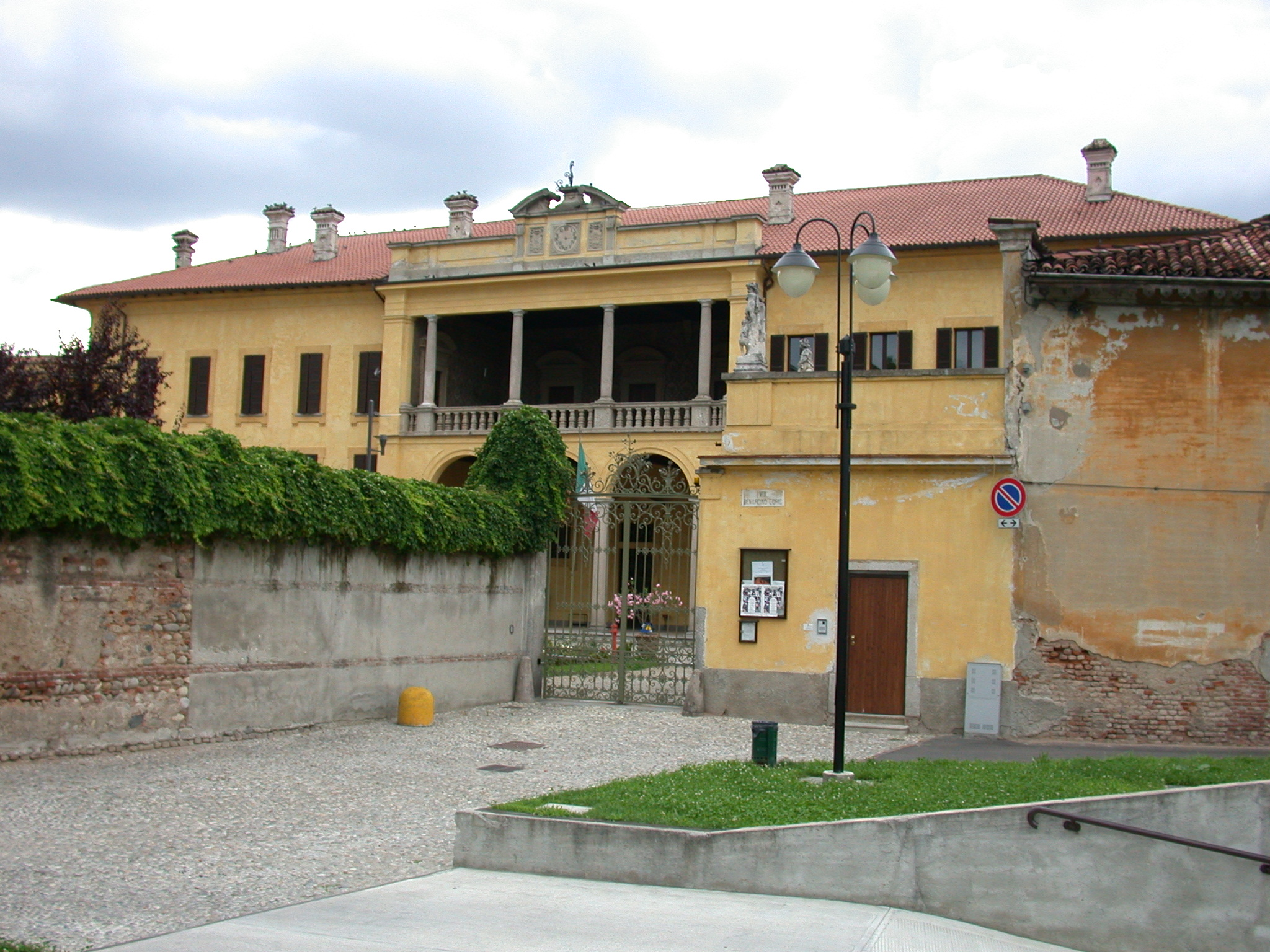
Palazzo Rusconi, now home of the City Council.

== Le Cascine ==
A Cascina is a type of courtyard farmstead, typical to the region, where all the buildings (dwellings for all workers and inhabitants, stables, storerooms, haylofts, wells, even mills) are built in a square around a courtyard.

- Cascina Malpaga: the largest in the area, has hosted up to 137 inhabitants
- Cascina Cantona
- Cascina Cornarina
- Cascina Saronna
