= Dairago =

Dairago Dairagh (Lombard)
- Comune
- Comune di Dairago
- Location within Italy Location within Lombardy
- Coordinates: 45°34′N 8°51′E
- Country: Italy
- Region: Lombardy
- Metropolitan city: Milan (MI)

Government
  - Mayor: Paola Rolfi

Area
  - Total: 5.6 km^{2} (2.2 sq mi)
- Elevation: 196 m (643 ft)

Population (28 February 2014)
  - Total: 6,167
  - Density: 1,100/km^{2} (2,900/sq mi)
- Demonym: Dairaghesi
- Time zone: UTC+1 (CET)
  - Summer (DST): UTC+2 (CEST)
- Postal code: 2020
- Dialing code: 0331
- Website: Official website

Dairago (Lombard: Dairagh or Dairaa [dai̯ˈrɑː(k)], locally [daˈjɑːɡu]) is a comune (municipality) in the Metropolitan City of Milan in the Italian region Lombardy, located about 25 kilometres (16 mi) northwest of Milan.

Dairago borders the following municipalities: Busto Arsizio, Legnano, Magnago, Villa Cortese, Buscate, Busto Garolfo, Arconate.
