= Busto Garolfo =

Busto Garolfo Büst Picul (Lombard)
- Comune
- Comune di Busto Garolfo
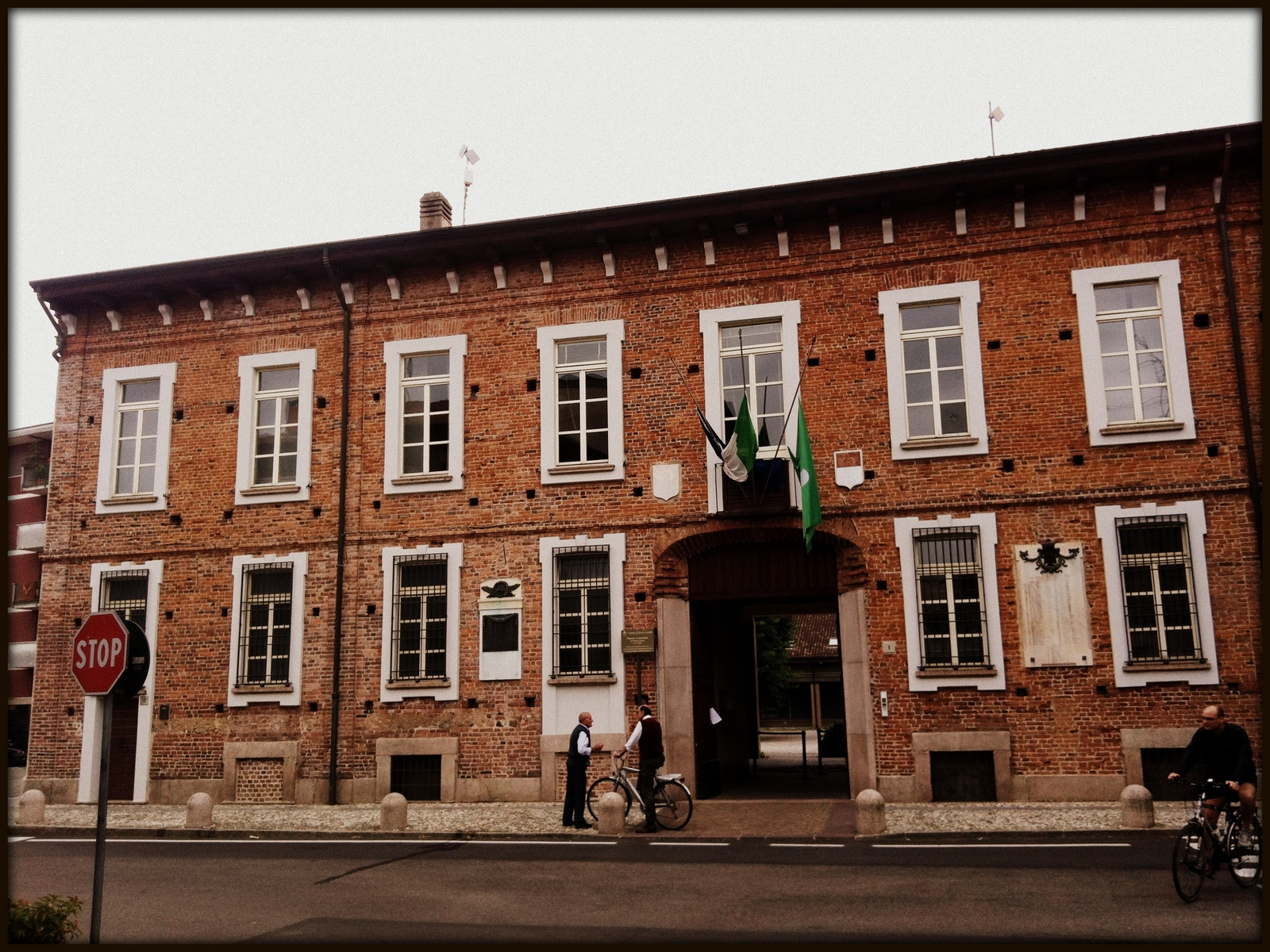
- Palazzo Molteni, Busto Garolfo.

- Coat of arms

- Busto Garolfo within the Metropolitan City of Milan

- Location within Italy Location within Lombardy
- Coordinates: 45°32′52″N 8°53′12″E
- Country: Italy
- Region: Lombardy
- Metropolitan city: Milan (MI)
- Frazioni: Olcella

Government
  - Mayor: Susanna Biondi

Area
  - Total: 12.8 km^{2} (4.9 sq mi)
- Elevation: 180 m (590 ft)

Population (30 Aprile 2023)
  - Total: 14,007
  - Density: 1,090/km^{2} (2,830/sq mi)
- Demonym: Bustesi
- Time zone: UTC+1 (CET)
  - Summer (DST): UTC+2 (CEST)
- Postal code: 20038
- Dialing code: 0331
- Patron saint: Beata Vergine del Rosario e santa Croce
- Website: Official website

Busto Garolfo (Lombard: Büst Picul) is a comune (municipality) in the Metropolitan City of Milan of 13 978 inhabitants. Busto Garolfo is located in the Italian region Lombardy, placed about 25 kilometres (16 mi) northwest of Milan.

== Toponymy ==
In the local dialect, belonging to Western Lombard, it is called Büst Picul ('Small Busto'), to distinguish it from Büsti Grandi ('Big Busto', which indicates the town of Busto Arsizio) and Büst(i) Cava (or Büscaa, i.e. Buscate).

== History ==
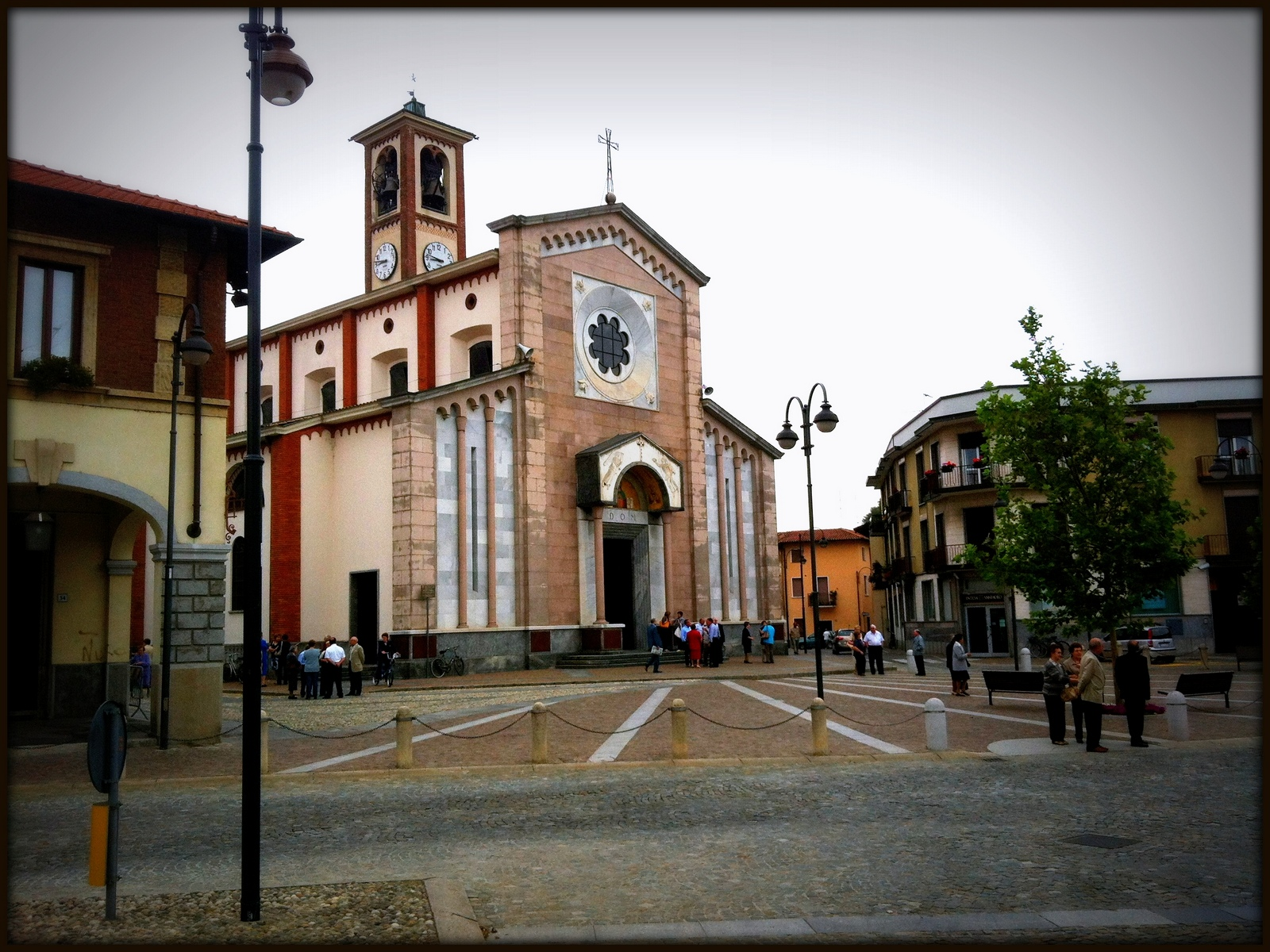
Church of the municipality

The first mention of the village of Busto Garolfo is in a 992 AD document. At the end of the 13th century there were three altars in honor of Saints Bartholomew, Innocent and Margaret, in the ancient church of San Salvatore, which had been built by the aristocratic della Croce family which had owned land in the area since 1317. In 1464, Stefano Della Croce in his will ordered his heirs to build a chapel in honor of the Virgin in the main church of San Salvatore. During the Late Middle Ages, Busto Garolfo became a feud first of the Maggi family, then of the Arconati family and later, of the Losetti family. In 1664, Giambattista Losetti sold the town to Giuseppe Arconati, to whom the King of Spain conferred the title of Marquess of Busto Garolfo.

After more than a century of Austrian domination, the town became involved in the events of the Italian Wars of Independence. Italian and the Austrian armies, often transited here, including during the Battle of Magenta in 1859.

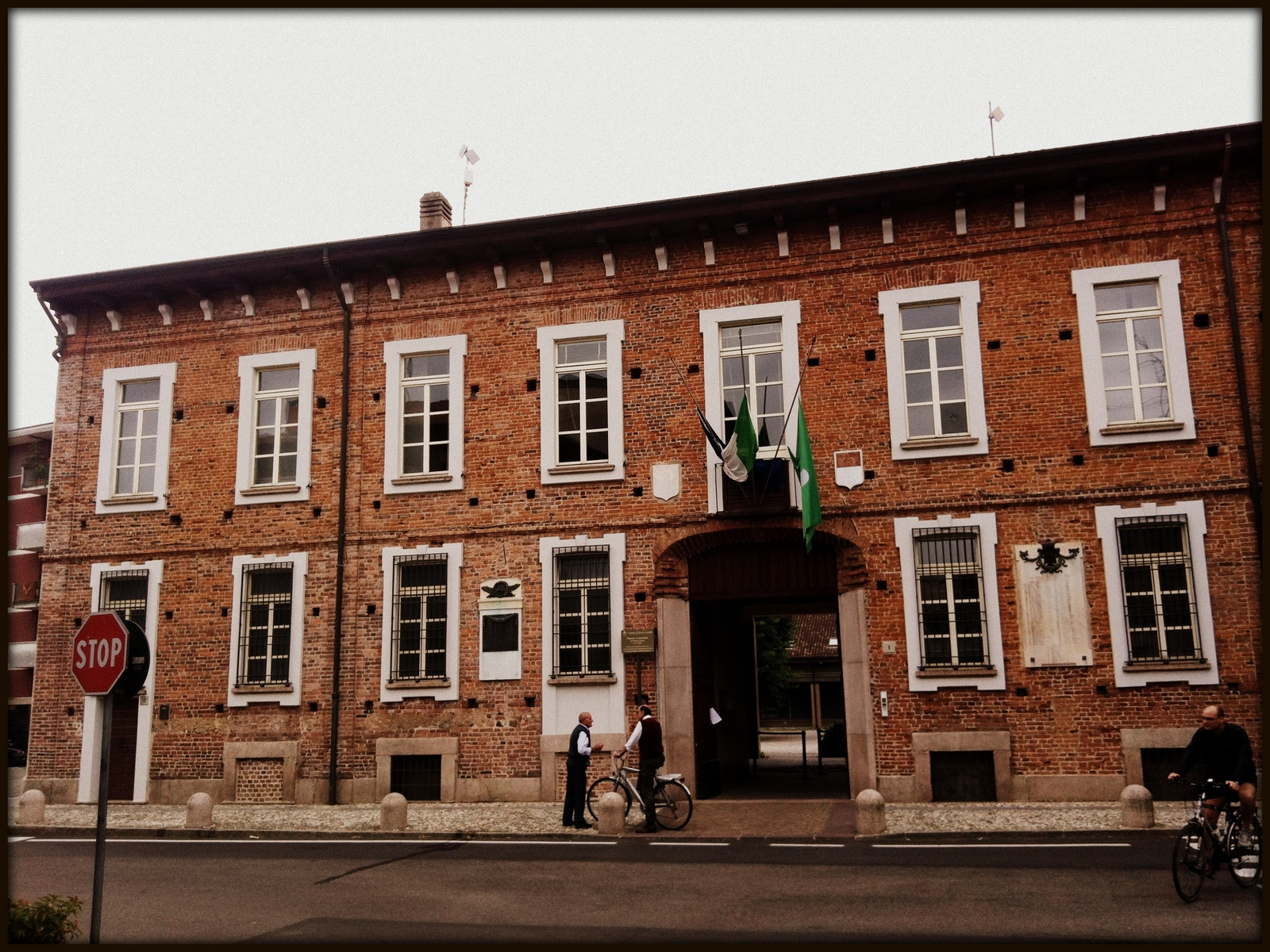
Municipality of Busto Garolfo, Palazzo Molteni.

== Geography ==
Busto Garolfo is located in the higher Po Valley. This area is called "Alto-Milanese" because of its location in the territory between the provinces of Milan and Varese. The town has got only one suburb named Olcella and located toward the north-western border. The Villoresi channel flows through the village. The lack of a nearby river required his construction, ended in 1890, to irrigate the corn fields in the area. Historically in the centre of the town there were two great weaving companies, now demolished to make way for some apartment buildings. In the post-war period the industrial area has spread to the east, in which there is a variety of small and medium-sized companies.

== Anthropic geography ==
The municipality of Busto Garolfo has only one district, Olcella, located between Arconate and Dairago, but in the past it also included Villa Cortese; probably because of the detachment of the latter, the inhabitants of Busto coined the expression "Villa Cortes, brutt paes, mila abitant, tucc ignorant" ("Villa Cortese, ugly village, thousand inhabitants, all ignorant"), which the villacortesini in response changed to "Villa Cortes, bell paes, mila abitant, tucc insegnant" ("Villa Cortese, beautiful village, thousand inhabitants, all teachers").

In 1461, Aloisio Della Croce, Milanese citizen and owner of numerous lands in the northern sector of the territory of Busto Garolfo, obtained from the town of the village the approval to build in that area a new farmhouse. Thus was born cassina Giella, today's Olcella, a farmhouse composed of several "habitationes" (houses).

== Society ==
=== Demographic evolution ===
- Men: 6.924
- Women: 7.054

=== Ethnic groups and foreign minorities ===
According to ISTAT data as of December 31, 2019 the resident foreign population was 1045 people and represents 7.5% of the population. The nationalities most represented according to their percentage of the total resident population were:

- Albania 182 17,42%
- Morocco 139 13.30%
- Romania 96 9,19%

In a smaller percentage, there were foreign citizens from: Pakistan (7.6%), Ukraine (6.7%), People's Republic of China (5.8%), Tunisia (4.8%), Bulgaria (3.6%).

== Twin towns ==
Busto Garolfo is twinned with Senise, in the province of Potenza. Reason of this friendship, is the strong presence in Busto Garolfo of "oriundi" of the Lucanian country, arrived here during the years of the economic boom, with the migrations from the South.

- Senise, Italy
