= Vanzaghello =

Vanzaghello Vanzaghell (Lombard)
- Comune
- Comune di Vanzaghello
- Coat of arms

- Location within Italy Location within Lombardy
- Coordinates: 45°35′N 8°47′E
- Country: Italy
- Region: Lombardy
- Metropolitan city: Milan (MI)

Government
  - Mayor: Arconte Gatti (Centrodestra Unito per Vanzaghello - Riaccendiamo Vanzaghello)

Area
  - Total: 5.5 km^{2} (2.1 sq mi)
- Elevation: 195 m (640 ft)

Population (1st January 2025)
  - Total: 5,316
  - Density: 970/km^{2} (2,500/sq mi)
- Demonym: Vanzaghellesi
- Time zone: UTC+1 (CET)
  - Summer (DST): UTC+2 (CEST)
- Postal code: 20020
- Dialing code: 0331
- Website: Official website

Vanzaghello (Milanese: Vanzaghell) is a comune (municipality) in the Province of Milan in the Italian region Lombardy, located about 35 kilometres (22 mi) northwest of Milan.

Vanzaghello borders the following municipalities: Samarate, Lonate Pozzolo, Magnago, Castano Primo. The economy, traditionally connected to textile industries and craftsmen, is now increasingly based on services.
