= Cuggiono =

- Comune
- Comune di Cuggiono
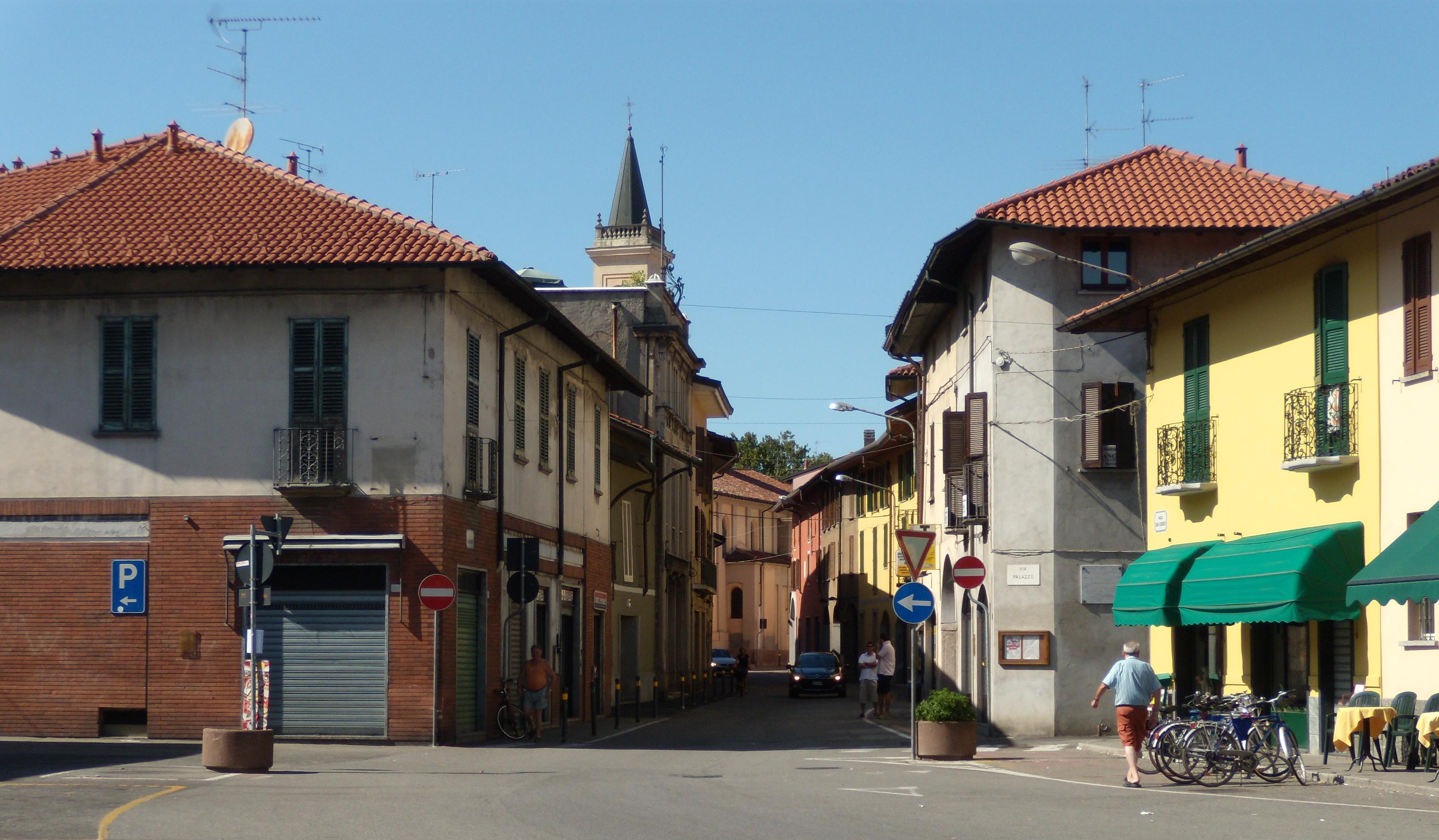

- Coat of arms

- Location within Italy Location within Lombardy
- Coordinates: 45°30′20″N 08°48′55″E
- Country: Italy
- Region: Lombardy
- Metropolitan city: Milan (MI)

Government
  - Mayor: Maria Teresa Perletti

Area
  - Total: 14 km^{2} (5.4 sq mi)
- Elevation: 157 m (515 ft)

Population (January 2014)
  - Total: 8,243
  - Density: 590/km^{2} (1,500/sq mi)
- Demonym: Cuggionesi
- Time zone: UTC+1 (CET)
  - Summer (DST): UTC+2 (CEST)
- Postal code: 20012
- Dialing code: 02
- Patron saint: St. George
- Website: Official website

Cuggiono (Lombard: Cugiònn [kyˈdʒɔn]) is a small Italian town and comune in the Metropolitan City of Milan, 50 kilometres (31 mi) west of Milan on the Motorway A4 to Turin, gate of Marcallo-Mesero.

American baseball player Yogi Berra's parents were from Malvaglio, just outside Cuggiono. Italian singer and composer Angelo Branduardi was born there.

Cuggiono is the sister city of Herrin, Illinois. Many Italians from Cuggiono immigrated to Southern Illinois to work in the coal mines with hopes of the American Dream in the late 19th and early 20th centuries. They formed neighborhoods in towns throughout Southern Illinois.

Cuggiono borders the following municipalities: Castano Primo, Buscate, Arconate, Robecchetto con Induno, Galliate, Mesero and Bernate Ticino.
