= Buscate =

Buscate Buscaa (Lombard)
- Comune
- Comune di Buscate
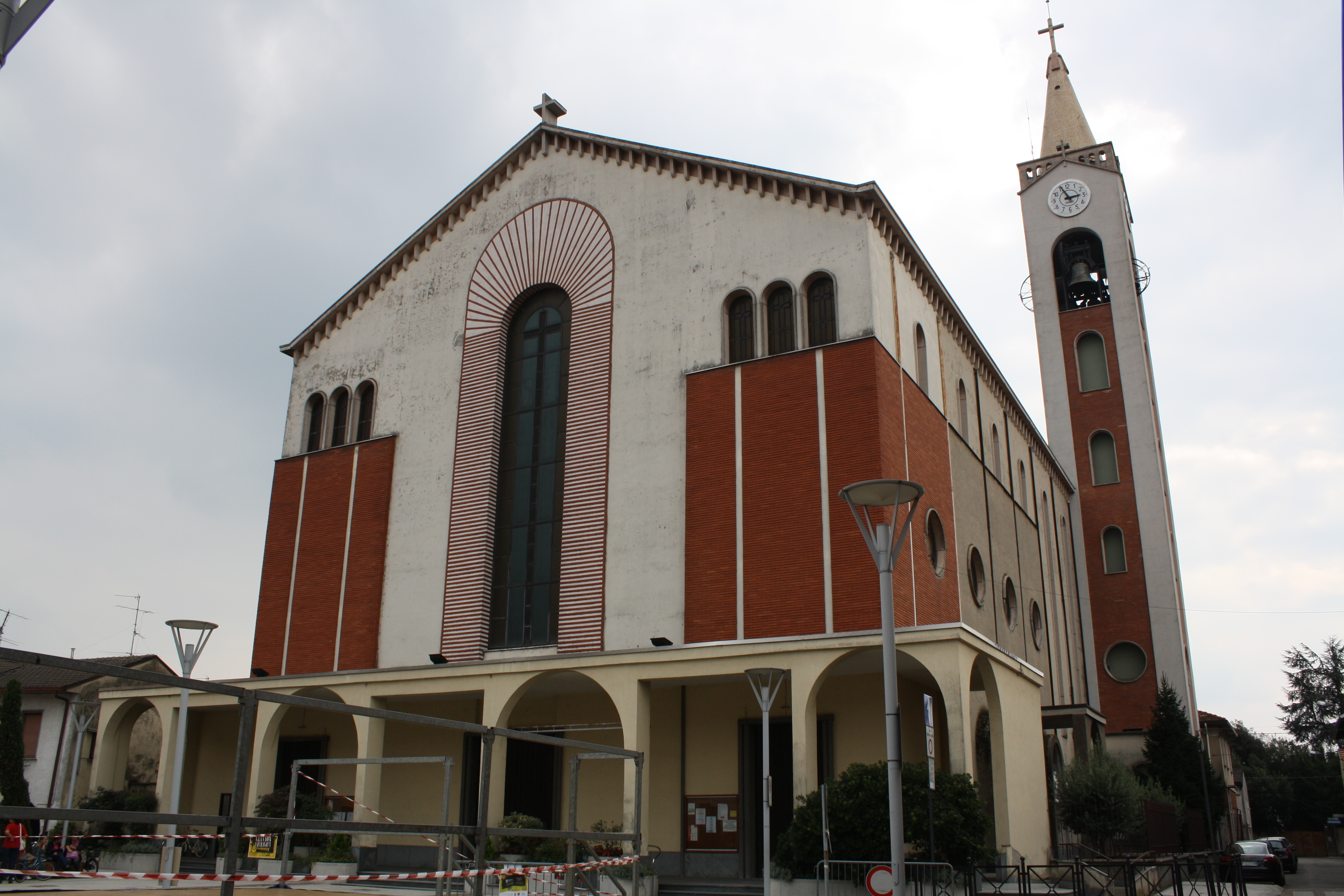

- Coat of arms

- Location within Italy Location within Lombardy
- Coordinates: 45°33′N 8°49′E
- Country: Italy
- Region: Lombardy
- Metropolitan city: Milan (MI)

Area
  - Total: 7.83 km^{2} (3.02 sq mi)

Population (Jan. 2014)
  - Total: 4,822
  - Density: 616/km^{2} (1,600/sq mi)
- Demonym: Buscatesi
- Time zone: UTC+1 (CET)
  - Summer (DST): UTC+2 (CEST)
- Postal code: 20010
- Dialing code: 0331
- Website: Official website

Buscate (Lombard: Buscaa [byˈskaː]) is a comune (municipality) in the province of Milan, in the Italian region Lombardy, located about 30 kilometres (19 mi) northwest of Milan. As of 1 January 2014, it had a population of 4,822 and an area of 7.83 square kilometres (3.02 mi^{2}).

It is the ancestral home of the Pisoni family.

Buscate borders the following municipalities: Magnago, Dairago, Castano Primo, Arconate, Inveruno, Cuggiono.

== Demographic evolution ==
Historical population

Year	Pop.	±%
1861	1,784	—
1871	1,842	+3.3%
1881	2,083	+13.1%
1901	2,375	+14.0%
1911	2,797	+17.8%

Year	Pop.	±%
1921	2,665	−4.7%
1931	2,781	+4.4%
1936	2,765	−0.6%
1951	3,030	+9.6%
1961	3,341	+10.3%

Year	Pop.	±%
1971	3,599	+7.7%
1981	4,180	+16.1%
1991	4,314	+3.2%
2001	4,228	−2.0%
2011	4,751	+12.4%

Source: Data from ISTAT
