= Ferno–Lonate Pozzolo railway station =

Railway station in Italy

Ferno–Lonate Pozzolo
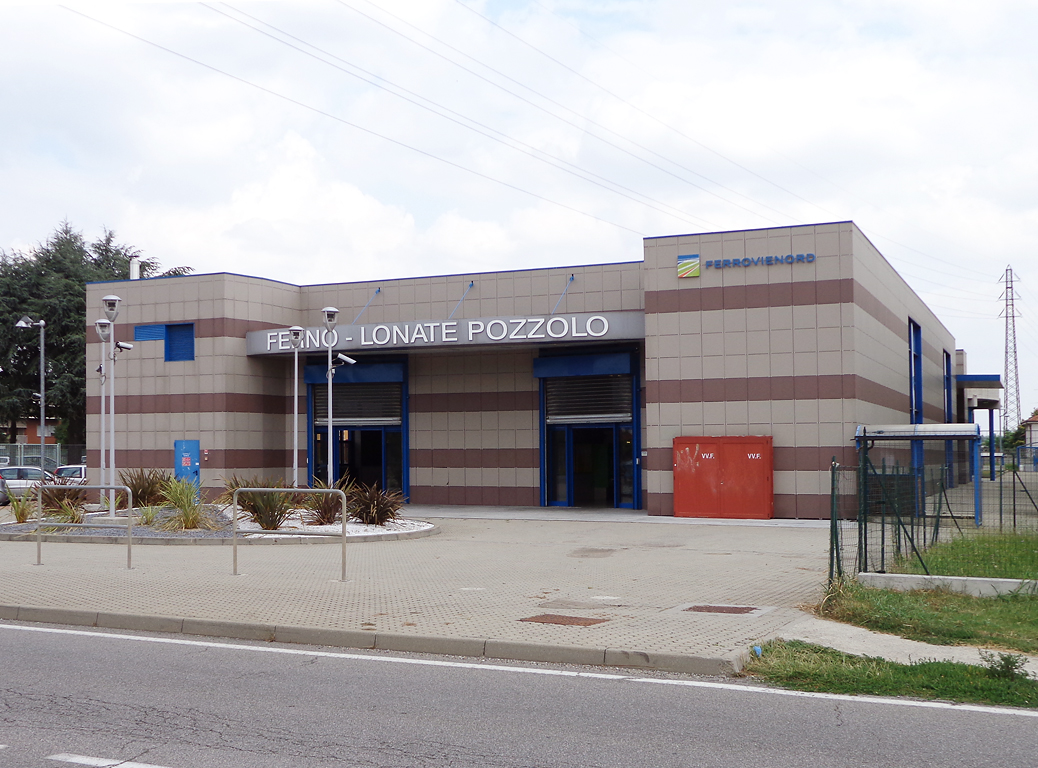
- The station entrance in 2012

General information
- Location: Ferno; Italy
- Coordinates: 45°36′31″N 8°45′18″E
- Owner: Ferrovienord
- Line: Busto Arsizio–Malpensa line
- Platforms: 2
- Tracks: 2
- Train operators: Trenord; Treni Regionali Ticino Lombardia

History
- Opened: 18 October 2009

Services
Preceding station	Trenord	Following station
Malpensa Aeroporto Terminal 1 towards Malpensa Aeroporto Terminal 2	Malpensa Express Milano Centrale	Busto Arsizio Nord towards Milano Centrale or Milano Cadorna
Preceding station	TiLo	Following station
Malpensa Aeroporto Terminal 1 towards Malpensa Aeroporto Terminal 2	S50	Busto Arsizio Nord towards Bellinzona
Location
- Location within Lombardy Location within Northern Italy Location within Italy

Ferno–Lonate Pozzolo is a railway station in Italy. Located on the Busto Arsizio–Malpensa railway, it serves the towns of Ferno and Lonate Pozzolo in Lombardy.

== History ==
The station was built together with the Busto Arsizio-Malpensa Airport line (opened in 1999), but was not opened due to the lack of local rail connections.

The station was finally opened on the 18 October 2009.

== Services ==
The station is served by one every four Malpensa Express trains between Malpensa Airport and Milano Centrale, operated by Trenord, and by the S50 line of the Ticino rapid transit network, operated by TILO. Both services have hourly and clock-faced frequencies.

From 1 February to 12 December 2010 the station was also served by some pairs of trains of the S10 line of the Milan S Lines.
