= Ferno =

- Comune
- Comune di Ferno
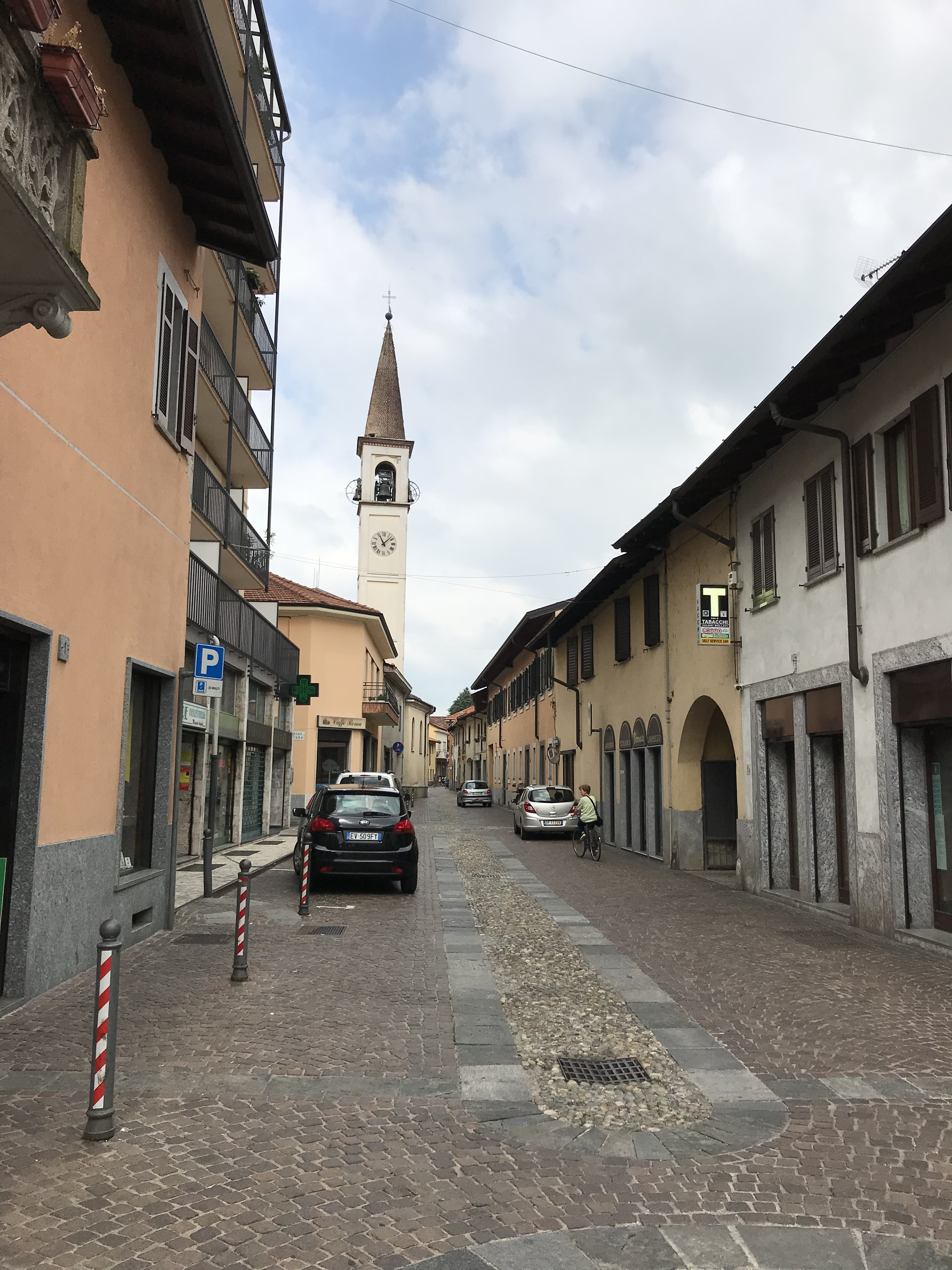
- Via Roma in central Ferno

- Location within Italy Location within Lombardy
- Coordinates: 45°37′N 8°45′E
- Country: Italy
- Region: Lombardy
- Province: Province of Varese (VA)
- Frazioni: San Macario

Government
  - Mayor: Sarah Foti

Area
  - Total: 8.5 km^{2} (3.3 sq mi)
- Elevation: 211 m (692 ft)

Population (December 2017)
  - Total: 6,858
  - Density: 810/km^{2} (2,100/sq mi)
- Demonym: Fernesi
- Time zone: UTC+1 (CET)
  - Summer (DST): UTC+2 (CEST)
- Postal code: 21010
- Dialing code: 0331
- Website: Official website

Ferno is a comune (municipality) in the Province of Varese in the Italian region Lombardy, located about 40 km (25 mi) northwest of Milan and about 35 km (22 mi) south of Varese. As of 31 December 2017, it had a population of 6,858 and an area of 8.5 km^{2} (3.3 sq mi).

The municipality of Ferno contains the frazione (subdivision) San Macario.

Ferno borders the following municipalities: Lonate Pozzolo, Samarate, Somma Lombardo, Vizzola Ticino. It is served by Ferno-Lonate Pozzolo railway station.

Volare Group SpA once had its head office in Area Tecnica Sud of Terminal 1 of Milan Malpensa Airport in Ferno.

== Architecture and Monuments ==
=== Civil Architectures ===
==== Saint Mary's Church ====
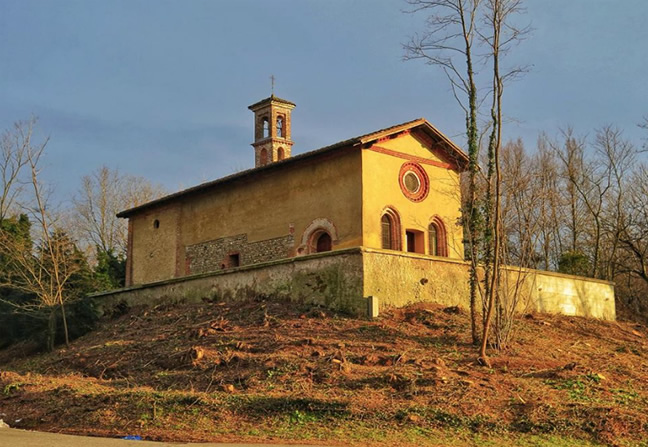
Ferno Santa Maria church

The church of Saint Mary is the oldest building of the village, and it is characterized by the romantic style of the XIV century. Several frescoes of the medieval era are present as well as a triptych of a disciple of Gaudenzio Ferrari.

== Demographic evolution ==
Historical population

Year	Pop.	±%
1861	1,969	—
1871	1,986	+0.9%
1881	2,184	+10.0%
1901	2,230	+2.1%
1911	2,346	+5.2%

Year	Pop.	±%
1921	2,137	−8.9%
1931	2,295	+7.4%
1936	2,300	+0.2%
1951	2,600	+13.0%
1961	3,436	+32.2%

Year	Pop.	±%
1971	4,590	+33.6%
1981	5,166	+12.5%
1991	6,134	+18.7%
2001	6,364	+3.7%

Source: Data from ISTAT

According to Istat's most recent population census, Ferno had approximately 6686 residents on December 31, 2022.
