= Malpensa Aeroporto railway station =

Malpensa Aeroporto railway station may refer to:

- Malpensa Aeroporto Terminal 1 railway station
- Malpensa Aeroporto Terminal 2 railway station
