= Cargoitalia =

Italian cargo airline

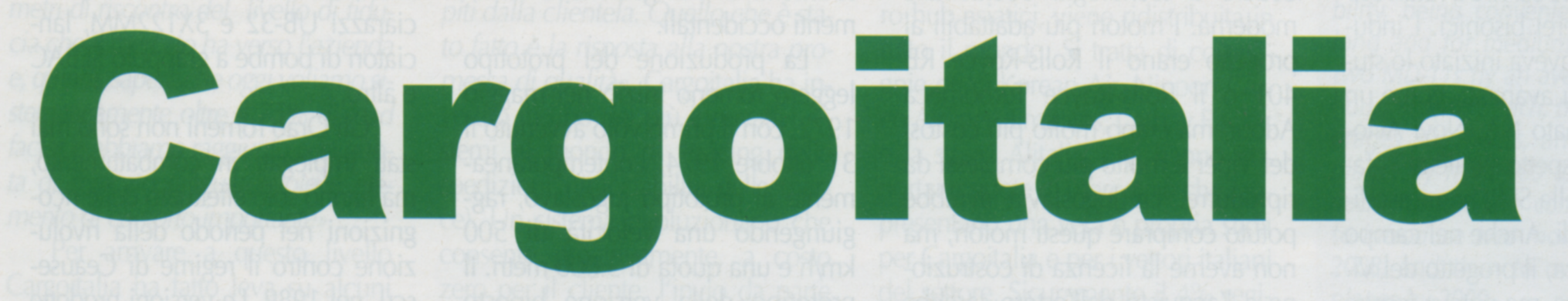
IATA	ICAO	Call sign
2G	CRG	CARGOITALIA
- Founded: 2005
- Ceased operations: 21 December 2011
- Hubs: Malpensa Airport
- Fleet size: 3
- Destinations: 7
- Headquarters: Lonate Pozzolo, Italy
- Website: cargoitalia.it/

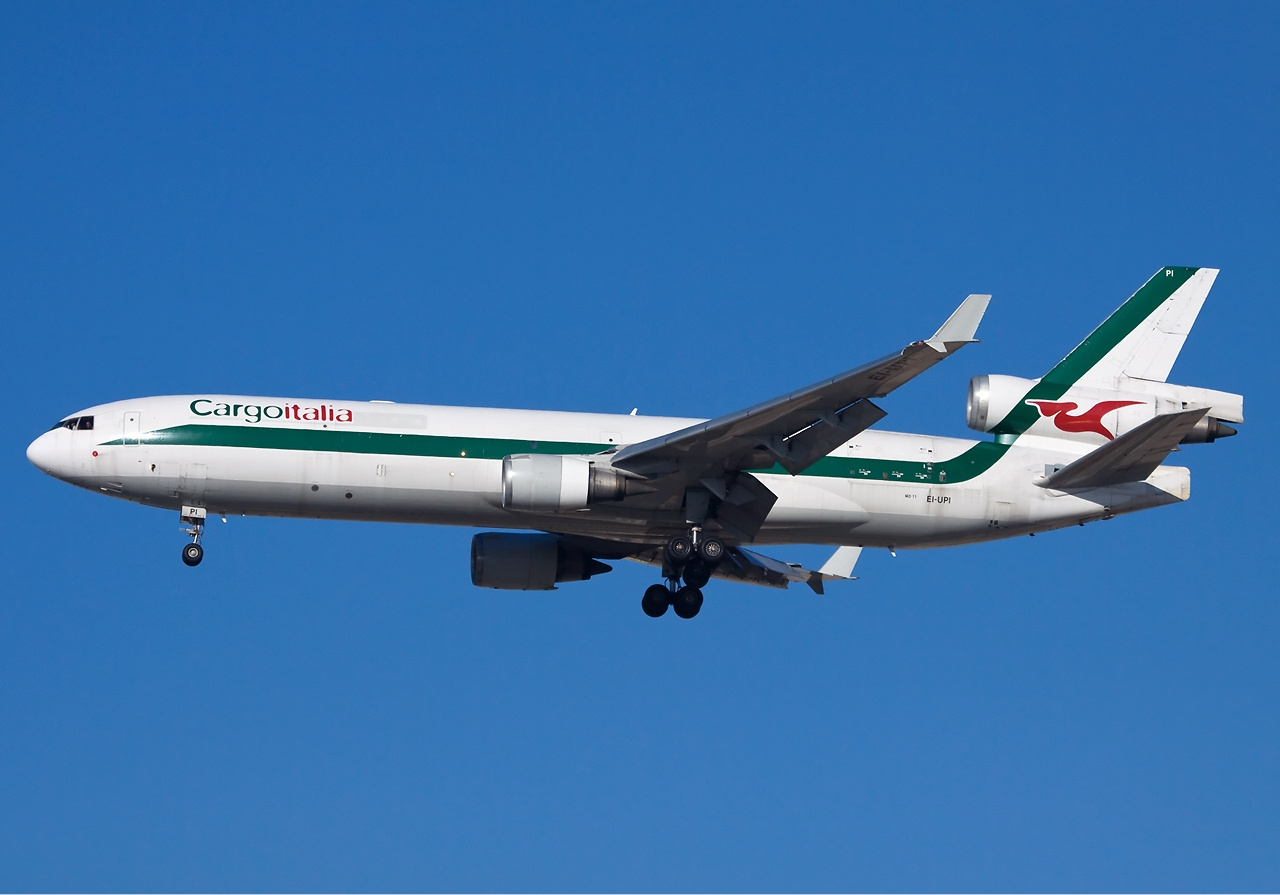
A Cargoitalia McDonnell Douglas MD-11F.

Cargoitalia S.p.A. was a cargo airline with its head office in the Avioport Logistics Park in Lonate Pozzolo, Province of Varese, Italy, near Milan. The airline had its registered office in Milan. It operated all-cargo scheduled and charter services from Italy to the Middle East, the Far East and North America. Its main base was Malpensa Airport.

== History ==
The airline was established in 2005 and is the first cargo airline to operate from Italy with private Italian capital.

As of December 2008, Alis Aerolinee Italiane has acquired Cargoitalia to get the air operator certificate of the financially struggling cargo carrier. The AOC is a prerequisite for its bid for the cargo division of Alitalia that CAI is not interested in. Cargoitalia has since replaced its operations with its single DC-10-30F freighter and has laid off the majority of its staff.

In May 2009, the airline restarted operations with a single McDonnell Douglas MD-11F.

On 21 December 2011, the airline ceased operations again.

== Destinations ==
Cargoitalia connected the following destinations at July 2011:

China

- Shanghai - Pudong International Airport

Hong Kong

- Hong Kong International Airport

Russia

- Krasnoyarsk - Yemelyanovo Airport

United Arab Emirates

- Dubai - Dubai International Airport
- Sharjah - Sharjah International Airport

United States

- Chicago - O'Hare International Airport
- New York City - John F. Kennedy International Airport

== Fleet ==
The Cargoitalia fleet included the following aircraft (as of July 2011):

Cargoitalia Historical Fleet
Aircraft	Total	Introduced	Retired	Remark
McDonnell Douglas DC-10-30AF	1	2006	2011	I-CGIA
McDonnell Douglas MD-11F	3	2009	2012	EI-EMS; EI-UPE; EI-UPI on lease

== See also ==
- List of defunct airlines of Italy
