= Saronno–Novara railway =

Railway line in Lombardy, Italy

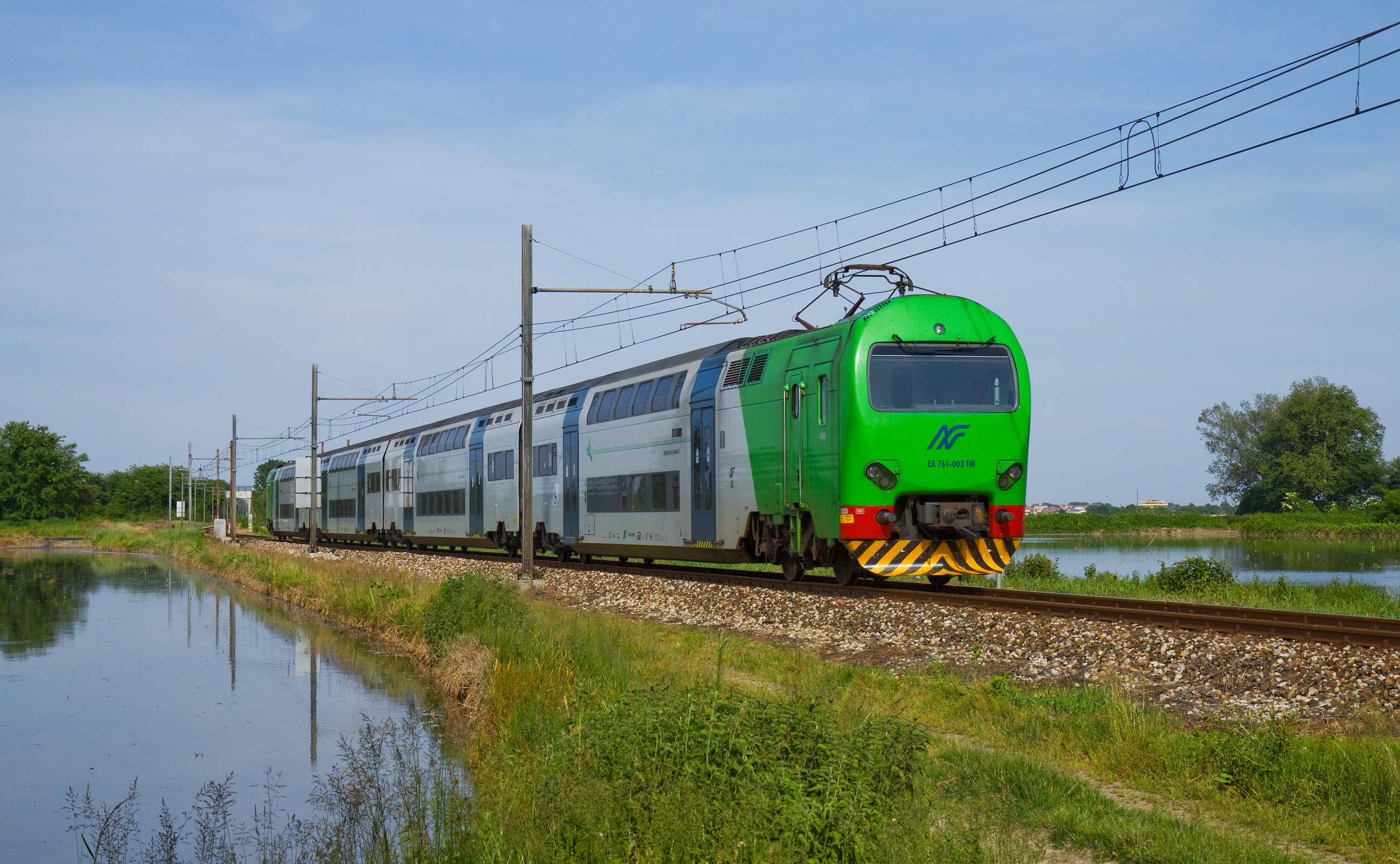
- The line between Galliate and Novara

Overview
- Native name: Ferrovia Saronno-Novara
- Owner: Ferrovienord
- Termini: Saronno railway station; Novara Nord railway station
- Stations: 9

Service
- Type: heavy rail
- Services: R27, R28, MXP
- Operator: Trenord

History
- Opened: 1887

Technical
- Line length: 40.019 km (24.867 mi)
- Number of tracks: 2 (Saronno–Turbigo); 1 (Turbigo–Novara)
- Track gauge: 1,435 mm (4 ft 8 1/2 in)
- Electrification: 3 kV DC, overhead line
- Operating speed: 160 km/h (99 mph)
- Highest elevation: 228 m (748 ft)

Saronno–Novara railway is a railway line in Lombardy, Italy.

It is one of the three continuations of the Milan-Saronno railway.

== History ==
The line was opened by the FNS in two parts in 1887:

- 27 June 1887: Novara (FNS)–Busto Arsizio (FNS)
- 5 October 1887: Busto Arsizio (FNS)–Saronno

The stations in Novara and in Busto Arsizio were connected by two railway junctions to the state railway stations:

- Novara (FNS)–Novara (RM), opened on 27 June 1887
- Busto Arsizio (FNS)–Busto Arsizio (RM), opened on 21 October 1887

A line for Malpensa Airport starts from Busto Arsizio Nord railway station.

== See also ==
- List of railway lines in Italy
