= Busto Arsizio Nord railway station =

Railway station in Busto Arsizio, Italy

Busto Arsizio Nord
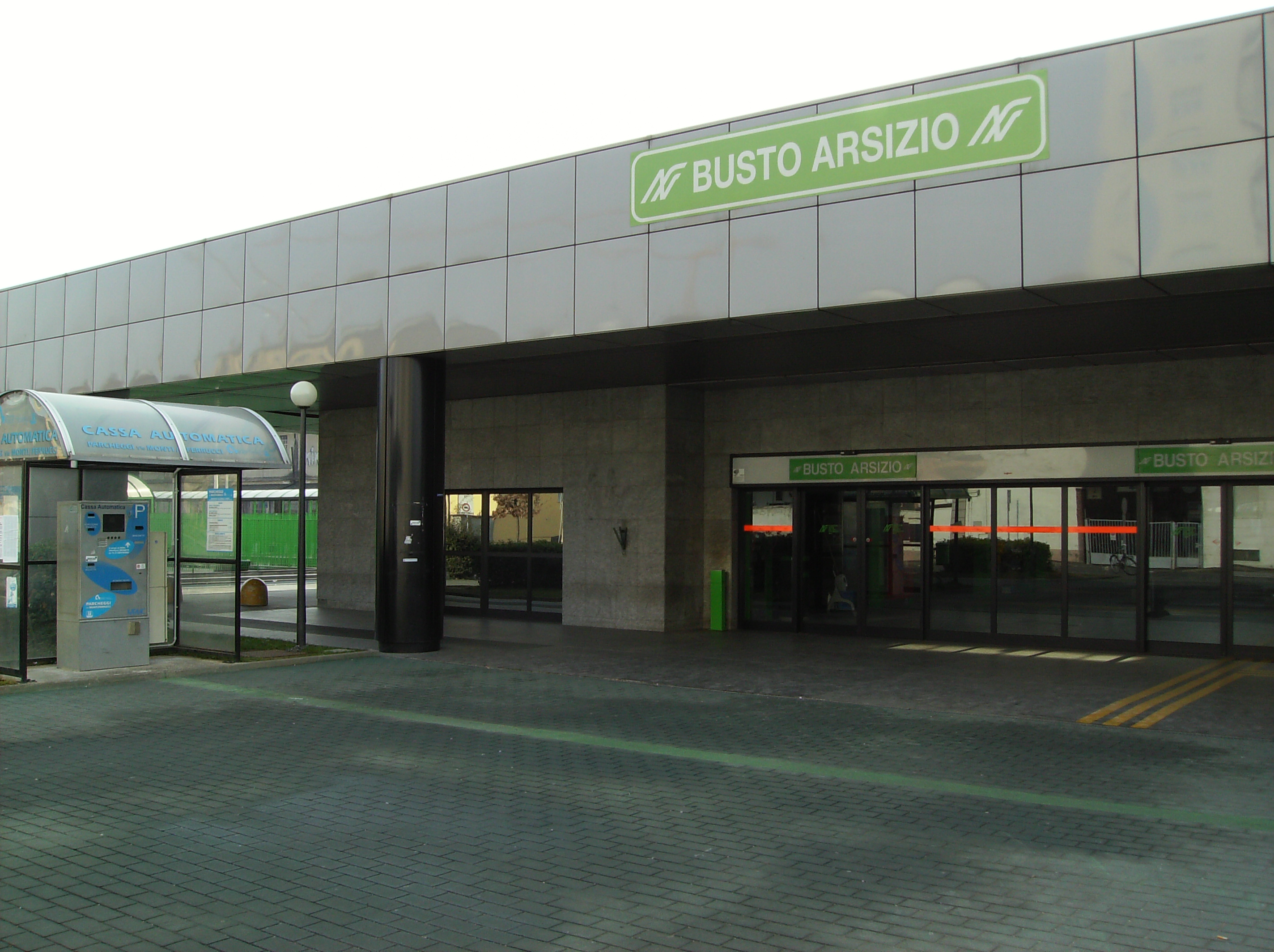
- The station entrance in 2007

General information
- Location: Busto Arsizio; Italy
- Coordinates: 45°36′22″N 8°51′05″E
- Owner: Ferrovienord
- Lines: Busto Arsizio–Malpensa line; Saronno–Novara line
- Platforms: 4
- Tracks: 4
- Train operators: Trenord; Treni Regionali Ticino Lombardia

Services
Preceding station	Trenord	Following station
Malpensa Aeroporto Terminal 1 towards Malpensa Aeroporto Terminal 2	Malpensa Express Milano Cadorna	Saronno towards Milano Centrale or Milano Cadorna
Ferno-Lonate Pozzolo towards Malpensa Aeroporto Terminal 2	Malpensa Express Milano Centrale	Castellanza towards Milano Centrale or Milano Cadorna
Vanzaghello-Magnago towards Novara Nord	R27	Castellanza towards Milano Cadorna
Preceding station	TiLo	Following station
Ferno-Lonate Pozzolo towards Malpensa Aeroporto Terminal 2	S50	Busto Arsizio towards Bellinzona
Location
- Location within Lombardy Location within Northern Italy Location within Italy

Busto Arsizio Nord is a railway station in Italy. Located on the Saronno–Novara railway, it serves the city of Busto Arsizio. It is joined by a junction track to the Busto Arsizio railway station, managed by Rete Ferroviaria Italiana. Some kilometers west from the station, at Bivio Sacconago, is the origin of the branch to Malpensa. The train services are operated by Trenord and TiLo.

== Train services ==
The station is served by the following services:

- Malpensa Express services (MXP) Malpensa Airport - Saronno - Milan
- Regional services TiLo (S50) Malpensa Airport - Gallarate - Laveno - Luino - Bellinzona
- Regional services (Treno regionale) Novara - Busto Arsizio - Saronno - Milan
