= Air Horizont =

Maltese charter airline

IATA	ICAO	Call sign
HT	HAT	SKY RUNNER
- Founded: 2014
- Commenced operations: 2 July 2015
- Hubs: London Southend Airport Milan Malpensa Airport
- Secondary hubs: Zaragoza Airport Bratislava Airport Porto Airport
- Fleet size: 6
- Parent company: Corporacion Aragonesa Aeronautica S.A
- Headquarters: Msida, Malta
- Key people: Manuel Sahli-Founder, Juan Luis Díez
- Website: airhorizont.com

Air Horizont Limited is a Spanish / Maltese charter airline headquartered in Msida, Malta and Zaragoza, Spain operating charter, ACMI and VIP flights mostly from London Southend Airport, Milan Malpensa Airport, Porto Airport, Zaragoza Airport and Bratislava Airport. It is a subsidiary of Corporacion Aragonesa Aeronautica S.A..

== History ==
Air Horizont was founded in 2014 by pilots Manuel Sahli and Juan Luis Díez.

The airline was set to commence operations in May 2015 using a Boeing 737-400 serving Munich, Seville, Alicante and Rome twice a week. However, the launch was postponed to July 2015, citing delays in receiving its air operating permit. In June 2015 it was announced that Air Horizont will not operate scheduled flights and instead focus on charter operations.

Since its founding, the airline has transported more than 1.5 million passengers to more than 250 airports. While being a commercial charter airline, they also specialise in VIP transport, most notably flying several well-known international sports teams around Europe.

The airline has two permanent bases at London Southend Airport and Milan Malpensa Airport, with temporary operating bases at Zaragoza, Bratislava and Porto.

== Fleet ==
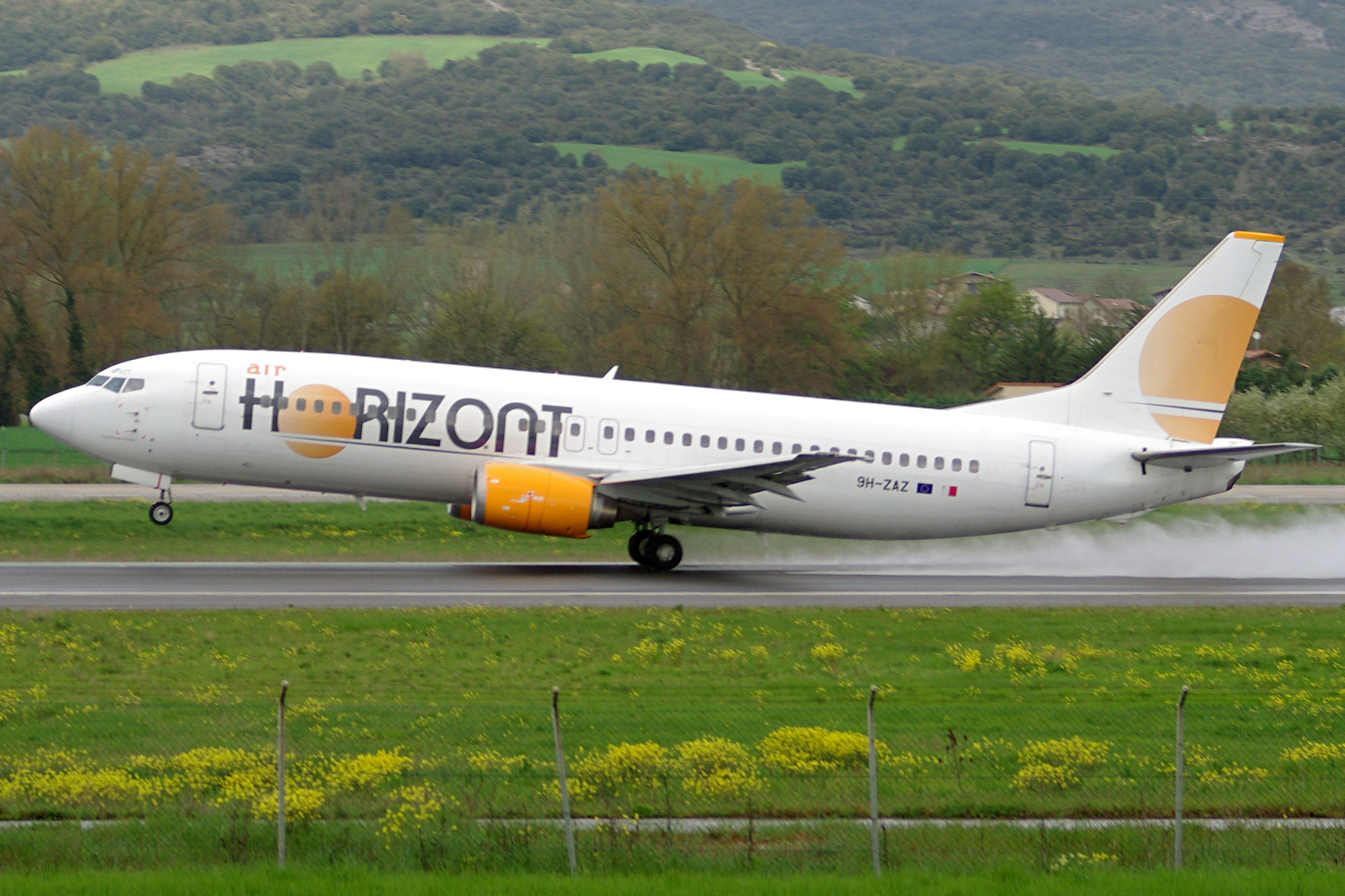
Air Horizont Boeing 737-400 at Vitoria-Gasteiz Airport

=== Current fleet ===
As of July 2026, Air Horizont operates the following aircraft:

Air Horizont fleet
Aircraft	Total	Orders	Passengers	Notes
Boeing 737-400	4	—	168	
Boeing 737-400	2	—	72	VIP configuration
Total	6	—		

=== Former fleet ===
As of August 2025, Air Horizont operated 6 Boeing 737-400.
