= Malpensa Express =

Italian railway service

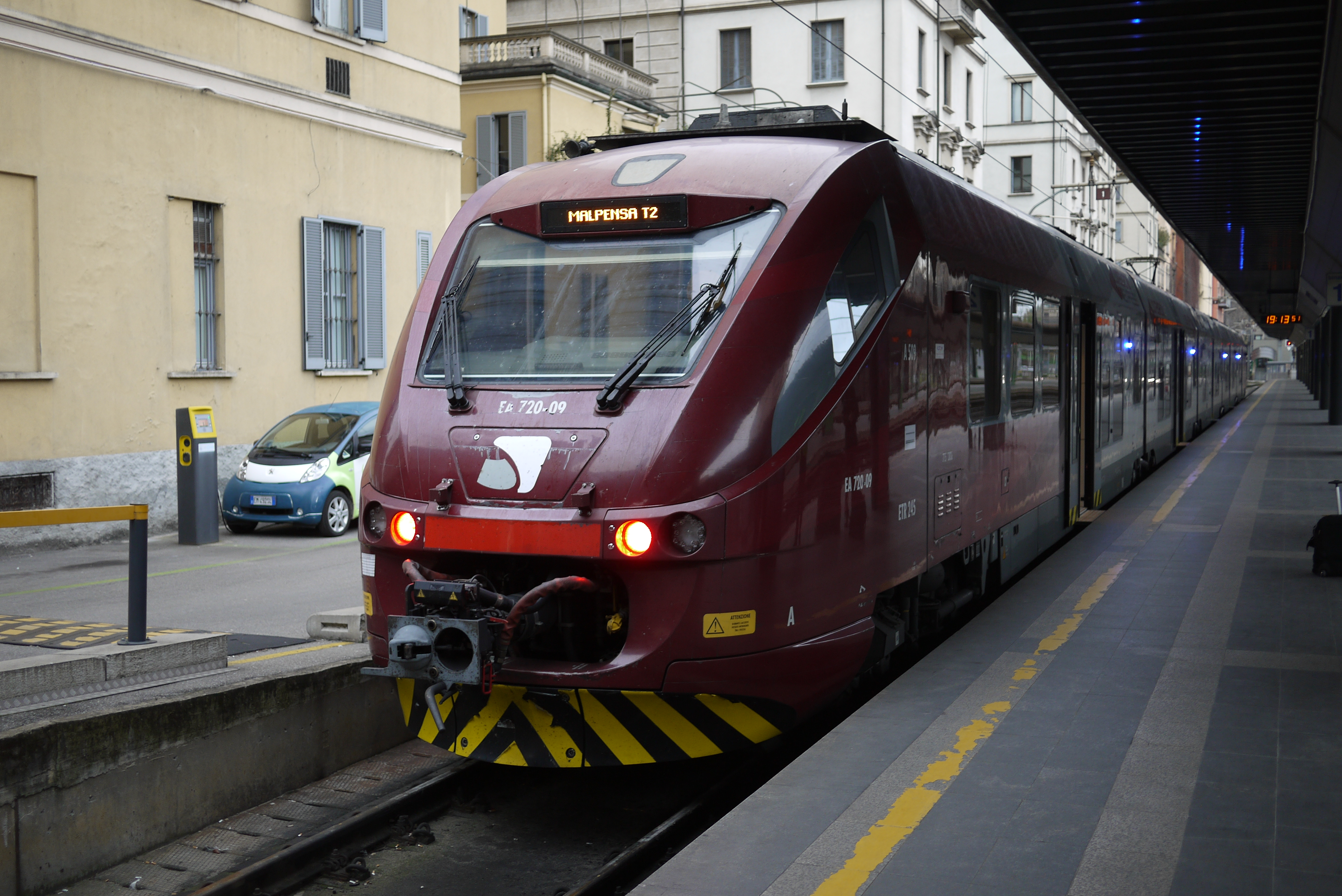
- Malpensa Express train stopping at Milano Cadorna

Overview
- Service type: Airport rail connection
- Status: Operating
- Locale: Lombardy
- First service: 30 May 1999
- Current operator: Trenord
- Former operator: LeNORD

Route
- Termini: Milano Cadorna or Milano Centrale; Malpensa Airport T2
- Stops: Up to nine
- Average journey time: Milano Cadorna to Malpensa Airport Terminal 2: 43 mins Milano Centrale to Malpensa Airport Terminal 2: 57 mins
- Service frequency: Cadorna–Malpensa: 2 per hour Centrale–Malpensa: 1-2 per hour

Technical
- Rolling stock: Convoglio Servizio Aeroportuale
- Track gauge: Standard gauge
- Electrification: 3 kV DC
- Track owners: Ferrovie Nord Milano; Rete Ferroviaria Italiana

The Malpensa Express is an airport rail service linking the city of Milan with Malpensa Airport, in the region of Lombardy, Northern Italy. Trenord operates Malpensa Express services between Malpensa Airport and both Milano Cadorna and Milano Centrale stations.

== History ==
Launched on 30 May 1999, the Malpensa Express originally ran between Malpensa Aeroporto and Milano Cadorna stations only. It was operated initially by Ferrovie Nord Milano and later by Trenitalia subsidiary LeNORD.

In late 2010, airport rail services to and from Malpensa were reorganised. Malpensa Express services to and from Milano Cadorna, operated by Trenord, continued to link the airport with the city. To coincide with the timetable change on 10 December 2010, however, new services to Milano Centrale were introduced.

In December 2016 a 3.4-kilometre (2.1 mi) extension of the line from Terminal 1 to Terminal 2 opened. The new Malpensa Terminal 2 railway station is 200 metres north of the T2 arrivals hall, that is accessed by an outdoor covered walkway.

== Train service ==
The Malpensa Express runs:

- between 04:27 and 23:27 from Milano Cadorna, and between 05:20 and 01:21 from Malpensa.
- between 05:25 and 23:25 from Milano Centrale, and between 05:37 and 01:21 from Malpensa.

=== Milano Cadorna–Malpensa ===
There are stopping services (Milano Bovisa, Saronno and Busto Arsizio Nord) linking Milano Cadorna station to Malpensa Airport, indicated as MXP (the IATA code for Malpensa) and usually is first class only. The running times of the services (Milano Cadorna to Malpensa Airport Terminal 2) is about 43 minutes.

From Milano Cadorna, the Malpensa Express runs along the Milan–Saronno railway to its first stop at Milano Bovisa, where there is interchange with trains to Erba and Asso and the suburban service to Camnago-Lentate.

The Malpensa Express then continues to Saronno (roughly halfway between Cadorna and Malpensa), which offers interchange with the lines for the cities of Varese-Laveno, or Como, or Seregno.

From Saronno, the Malpensa Express proceeds along the Saronno–Novara railway, to the junction at Sacconago, located just beyond Busto Arsizio, which is the final stop before Malpensa Airport. It then heads to the airport along a rail link branching off to the right from the line to Novara.

The Malpensa Express stops at Terminal 1 of the airport and continues then to Terminal 2.

=== Milano Centrale–Malpensa ===
There are two kind of train services linking Milano Centrale to Malpensa Airport. One service (MXP) calls at Milano Porta Garibaldi (a station more often used than Centrale by commuters around the city), Milano Bovisa, Saronno and Busto Arsizio Nord; the other service (R) call at Milano Porta Garibaldi, Milano Bovisa, Saronno, Rescaldina, Castellanza, Busto Arsizio Nord and Ferno-Lonate Pozzolo. The running times of both services (Milano Centrale to Malpensa Airport Terminal 2) is about 57 minutes; they both have 2' class.

At Milano Centrale station, the Malpensa Express departs usually from tracks 1 or 2, and heads along the new railway section nicknamed the "Umbrella Handle" (opened on 31 July 2010, but not fully operational until 13 September 2010). the Malpensa Express then passes through Mirabello junction to join the line from Greco Pirelli to Milano Porta Garibaldi station (west of Milano Centrale station).

At Porta Garibaldi station, the Malpensa Express uses the new route (to the north of the old one), which crosses Farini yard. It reaches PM Ghisolfa and leaves the RFI network to enter tracks 1 and 2 at Milano Bovisa station. The rest of the Malpensa Express route from Bovisa-Politenico station to Malpensa is the same as for its counterparts from Cadorna.

=== Tickets ===
The use of above trains for journeys starting or ending in Malpensa Airport Stations is allowed with a special price ticket, but is also possible a limited use with other kind of tickets usually valid for trains in Lombardia region. Even the other rail service to Malpensa (TILO S50) has a similar ticket limitation scheme for journeys starting or ending in Malpensa.

== Rolling stock ==
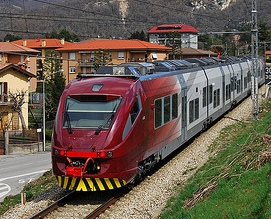
A CSA train

The original Malpensa Express trains were Treno ad alta frequentazione (English: High frequency trains) (TAF trains). Their livery is a combination of the colours burgundy, dark green and cream and sometimes sponsored coaches.

Since February 2010, a new class of trains, the Convoglio Servizio Aeroportuale (English: Airport Service Convoy) (CSA trains), has been gradually introduced. The CSA trains are designed specifically for the Malpensa Express services.

Some services use Caravaggio trainsets operated by Trenord.

Both classes of train are push-pull articulated electric multiple units, with a powered section at each end, and unpowered sections in between. The TAF trains have two unpowered sections; the CSA trains have three.

== See also ==
- Transport in Milan
- Rail transport in Italy
