= AlbaStar =

Spanish airline

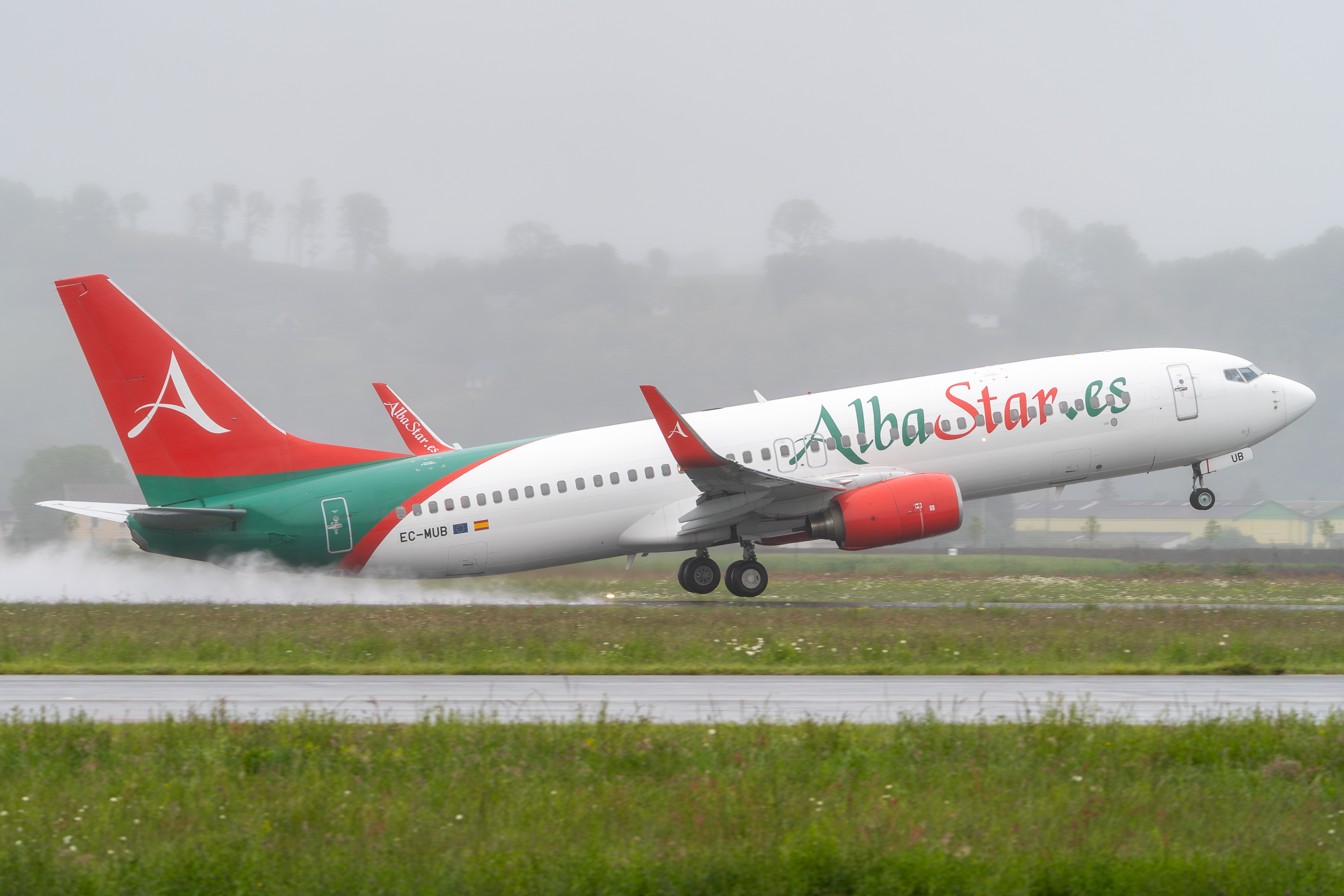
IATA	ICAO	Call sign
AP	LAV	ALBASTAR
- Founded: 30 November 2009; 16 years ago
- Commenced operations: 31 July 2010; 16 years ago
- Ceased operations: 10 November 2026; 6 days ago
- Hubs: Milan–Malpensa; Bergamo; Palma de Mallorca; Trapani
- Fleet size: 5
- Destinations: 12
- Headquarters: Palma de Mallorca, Balearic Islands, Spain
- Key people: Pino D'Urso
- Employees: 200
- Website: www.albastar.es

AlbaStar S.A. was a privately owned Spanish airline headquartered in Palma de Mallorca that carried out charter flights.

== History ==
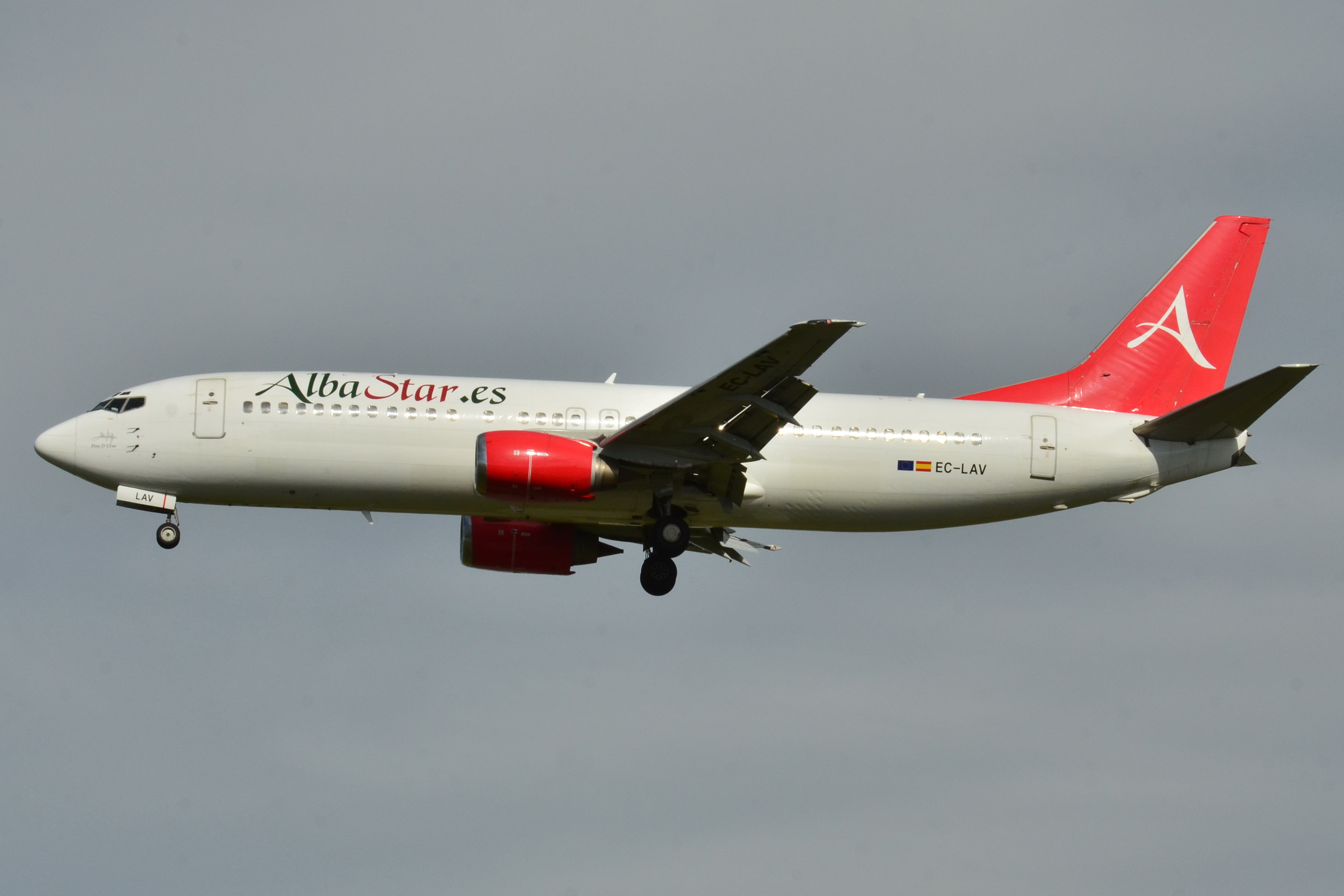
A former Albastar Boeing 737-400 in 2013.

Albastar was founded in 2009 by Italian and British entrepreneurs and obtained its Air Operator Certificate in 2010 as a charter carrier for tour operators. The company's first aircraft, a Boeing 737-400, was named “Pino D’Urso” after the airline's founder.

In 2014, AlbaStar inaugurated an operational base at Milan Malpensa Airport. In 2019, the airline obtained the IOSA certification (International Operational Safety Audit) and became a member of the International Air Transport Association.

On 10 November 2026, AlbaStar announced it was suspending operations and preparing to file for insolvency proceedings.

== Fleet ==
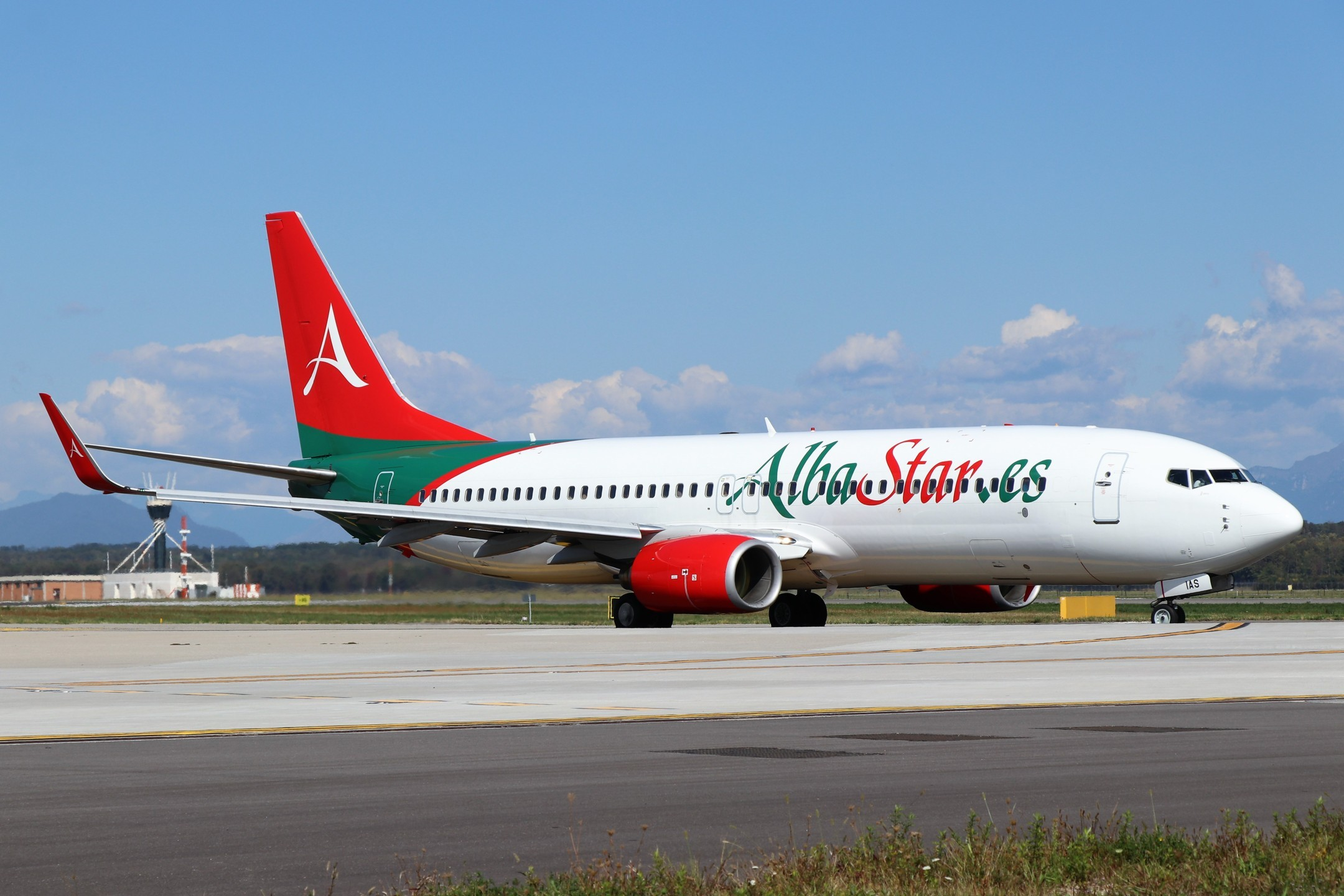
AlbaStar Boeing 737-800

At time of closure, AlbaStar operated the following aircraft:

Aircraft	In service	Orders	Passengers	Notes
Boeing 737-800	5	—	189	
Total	5	—		
