= Malpensa Aeroporto Terminal 1 railway station =

Railway station in Italy

Malpensa Aeroporto T1
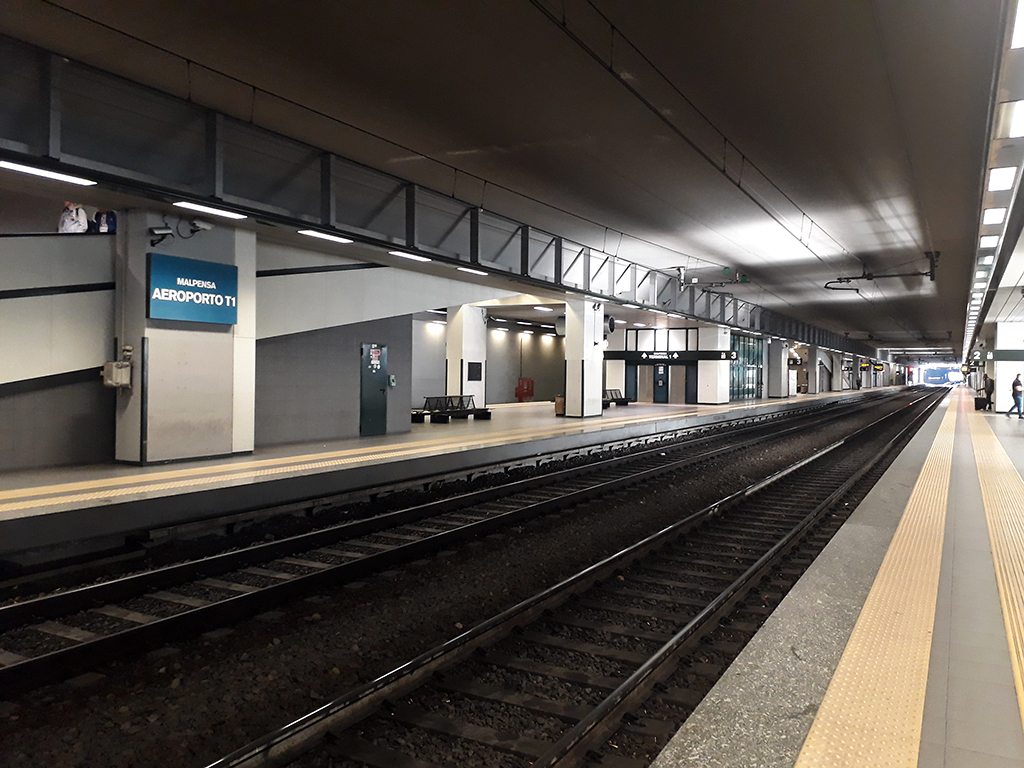
- The station platforms in 2019

General information
- Location: Milan-Malpensa Airport; Italy
- Coordinates: 45°37′41″N 8°42′40″E
- Owner: Ferrovienord
- Line: Busto Arsizio–Malpensa line
- Platforms: 2
- Tracks: 4
- Train operators: Trenord; Treni Regionali Ticino Lombardia

History
- Opened: 30 May 1999

Services
Preceding station	Trenord	Following station
Malpensa Aeroporto Terminal 2 Terminus	Malpensa Express Milano Cadorna	Busto Arsizio Nord towards Milano Centrale or Milano Cadorna
Malpensa Aeroporto Terminal 2 Terminus	Malpensa Express Milano Centrale	Ferno-Lonate Pozzolo towards Milano Centrale or Milano Cadorna
Preceding station	TiLo	Following station
Malpensa Aeroporto Terminal 2 Terminus	S50	Ferno-Lonate Pozzolo towards Bellinzona
Location
- Location within Lombardy Location within Northern Italy Location within Italy

Malpensa Aeroporto Terminal 1 is a railway station serving Terminal 1 of Milan–Malpensa Airport. It opened in 1999 as Malpensa Aeroporto, as the then western terminus of the Busto Arsizio–Malpensa Airport railway, and is managed by Ferrovienord. In 2016, following the 3.4 kilometer railway extension to Terminal 2, the station was renamed Malpensa Aeroporto Terminal 1.

== Train services ==
The train services are operated by Trenord and TILO and run on a clock-face schedule:

- Trenord Malpensa Express: Malpensa Airport T2-Malpensa Airport T1-Saronno-Milan Cadorna/Milan Centrale, with quarter-hourly frequency (2 trains per hour to Cadorna, 2 to Centrale)
- TILO S50: Malpensa Airport T2-Malpensa Airport T1-Gallarate-Varese-Mendrisio-Lugano-Bellinzona, with hourly frequency
