= Lonate Pozzolo =

Lonate Pozzolo Lonaa Pozzoeu
- Comune
- Comune di Lonate Pozzolo
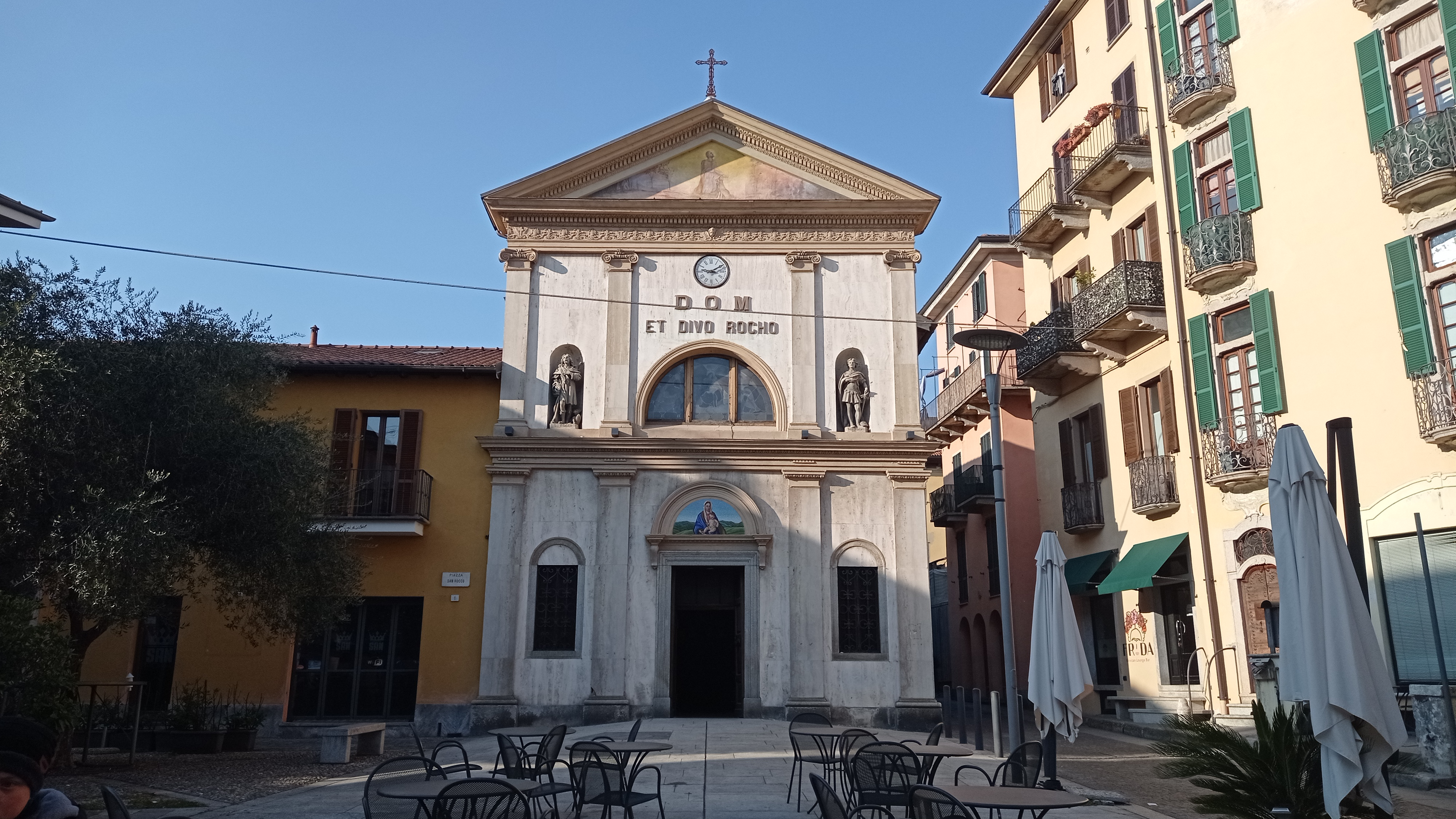
- Church of Santa Maria degli Angeli

- Location within Italy Location within Lombardy
- Coordinates: 45°36′N 08°45′E
- Country: Italy
- Region: Lombardy
- Province: Varese (VA)
- Frazioni: Sant'Antonino Ticino, Tornavento

Government
  - Mayor: Elena Carraro

Area
  - Total: 29 km^{2} (11 sq mi)
- Elevation: 205 m (673 ft)

Population (31 December 2017)
  - Total: 11,787
  - Density: 410/km^{2} (1,100/sq mi)
- Demonym: Lonatesi
- Time zone: UTC+1 (CET)
  - Summer (DST): UTC+2 (CEST)
- Postal code: 21015
- Dialing code: 0331
- Patron saint: Saint Ambrose
- Saint day: 7 December
- Website: Official website

Lonate Pozzolo is a town and comune located in the province of Varese, in the Lombardy region of northern Italy. Based on the last population census, it has about 11.400 residents. It is served by Ferno-Lonate Pozzolo railway station.

The airline Cargoitalia had its head office in the Avioport Logistics Park in Lonate Pozzolo.

== Twin towns ==
- San Rafael, California, United States
