= Milan Malpensa Airport =

Main airport serving Milan, Italy

Milan Malpensa Airport Aeroporto internazionale di Milano-Malpensa "Silvio Berlusconi"

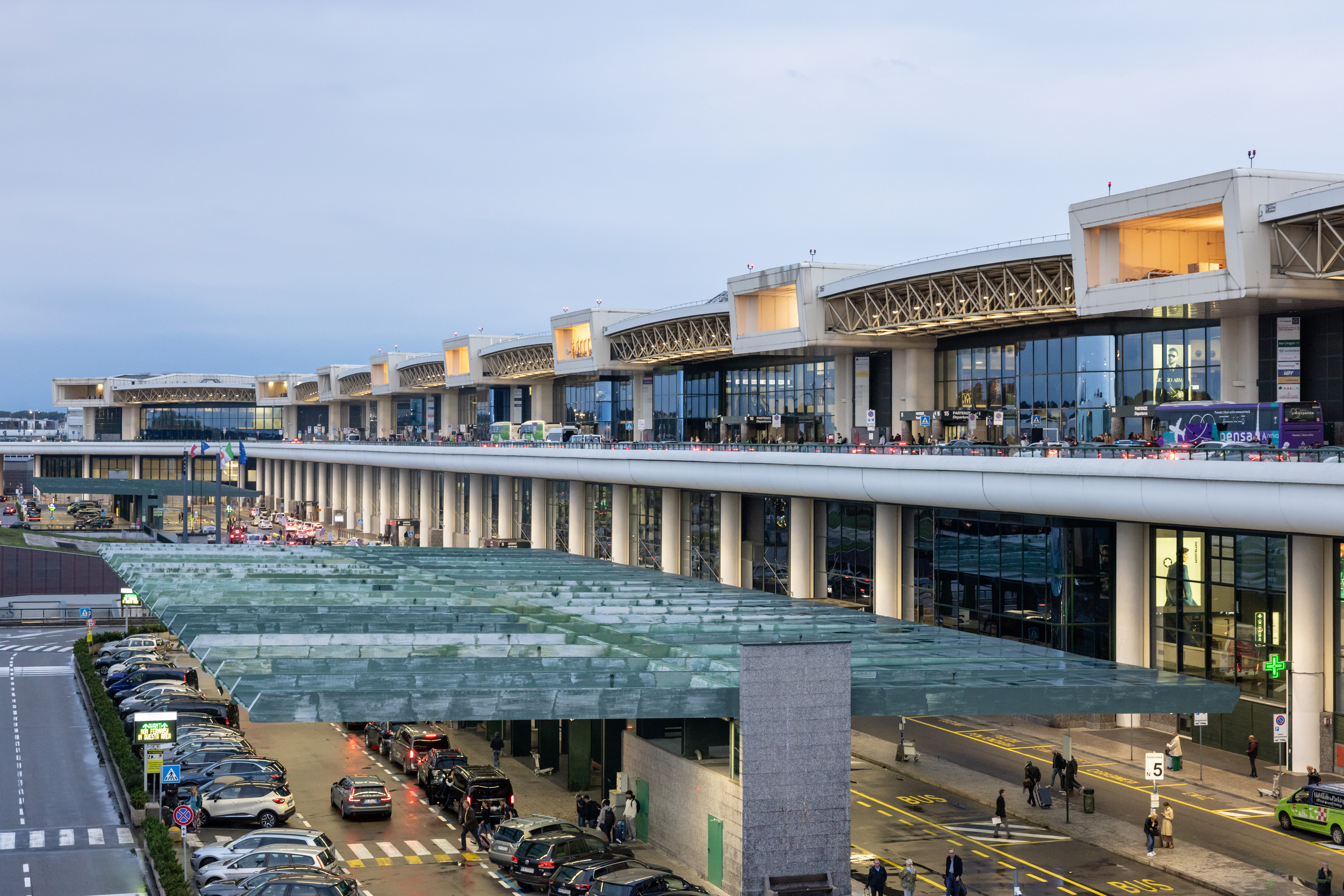
- IATA: MXP; ICAO: LIMC; WMO: 16066

Summary
- Airport type: Public
- Owner: SEA S.p.A
- Operator: SEA Aeroporti di Milano
- Serves: Milan metropolitan area; Northern Italy; Canton of Ticino (Switzerland)
- Location: Ferno, Varese, Italy
- Opened: 21 November 1948; 77 years ago
- Hub for: Cargolux Italia; DHL Aviation; FedEx Express
- Focus city for: Amazon Air
- Operating base for: AlbaStar; easyJet; Malta Air; Neos; Ryanair; Wizz Air
- Built: 1909–1910
- Elevation AMSL: 767 ft (234 m)
- Coordinates: 45°37′48″N 8°43′23″E
- Website: www.milanomalpensa-airport.com/en

Map
- Location within Northern Italy MXP/LIMC (Italy) MXP/LIMC (Europe)

Runways
Direction	Length		Surface
Direction	m	ft	Surface
17L/35R	3,920	12,861	Asphalt
17R/35L	3,920	12,861	Asphalt

Statistics (2024)
- Passengers: 28,910,368
- Aircraft movements: 214,511
- Cargo tons: 731,640
- Statistics from Assaeroporti

Milan Malpensa Airport (IATA: MXP, ICAO: LIMC) is an international airport in Ferno, in the Province of Varese, Lombardy, Italy. It is the largest airport in northern Italy, serving Lombardy, Piedmont, and Liguria, as well as the Swiss canton of Ticino. It is located 49 kilometres (30 mi) northwest of Milan, next to the Ticino river dividing Lombardy and Piedmont. The airport is located inside the Parco Naturale Lombardo Della Valle Del Ticino, a nature reserve included by UNESCO in the World Network of Biosphere Reserves. The airport was opened in 1909 by Giovanni Agusta and Gianni Caproni to test their aircraft prototypes, before switching to civil operation in 1948.

Malpensa Airport is ninth in the world and sixth in Europe for the number of countries served with direct flights. In 2024, Malpensa Airport handled 28.5 million passengers and was the 22nd-busiest airport in Europe in terms of passengers and second-busiest airport in Italy in terms of passengers after Rome Fiumicino Airport. It is the busiest airport in Italy for freight and cargo, handling over 730,000 tons of international freight annually (2024).

Together with Milan Bergamo Airport and Milan Linate Airport, it forms the Milan airport system with 56.9 million passengers in 2024, the largest airport system in Italy by number of passengers.

== History ==
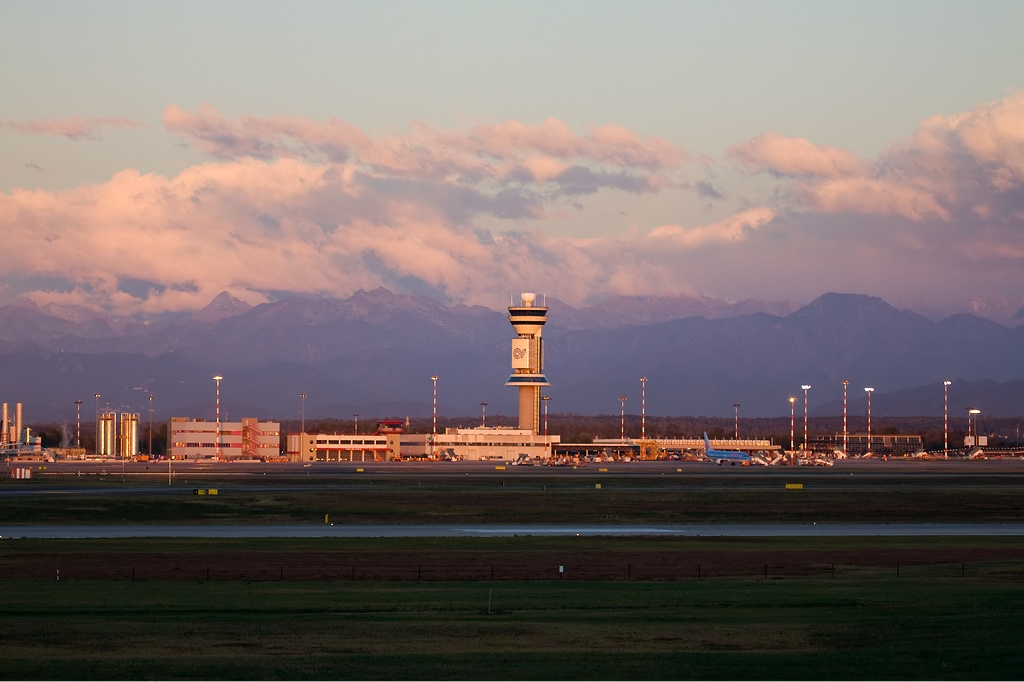
Control tower with the Italian Alps visible in the background

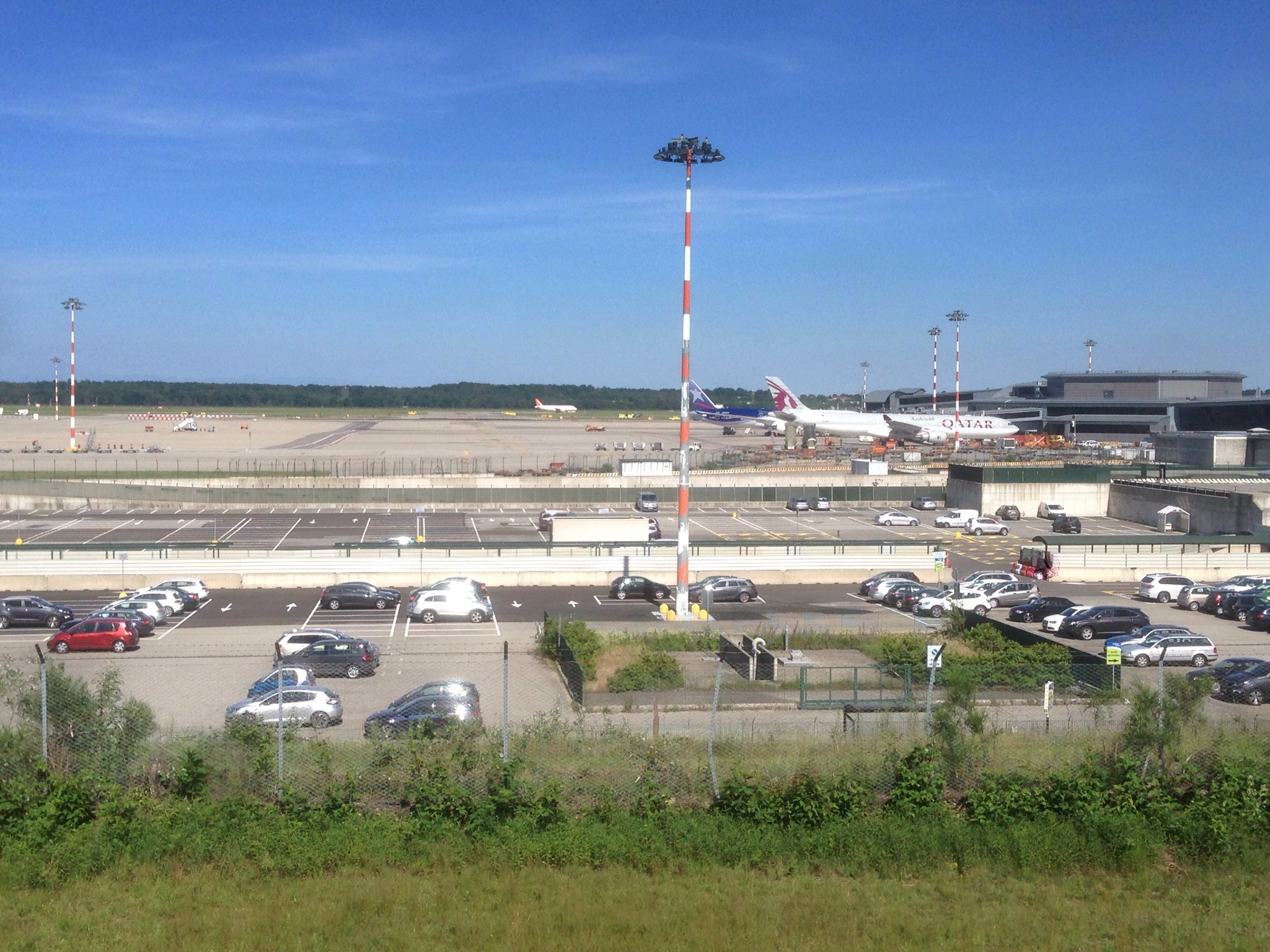
Apron view

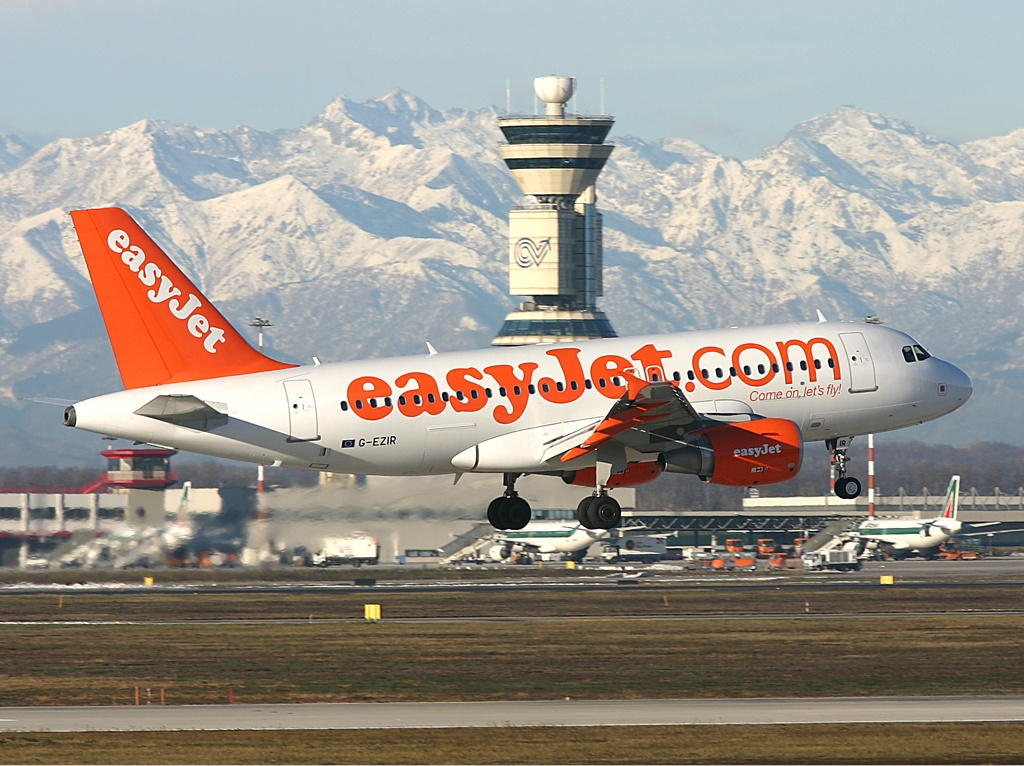
An easyJet Airbus A319-100 landing at Malpensa with the Alps visible in the background

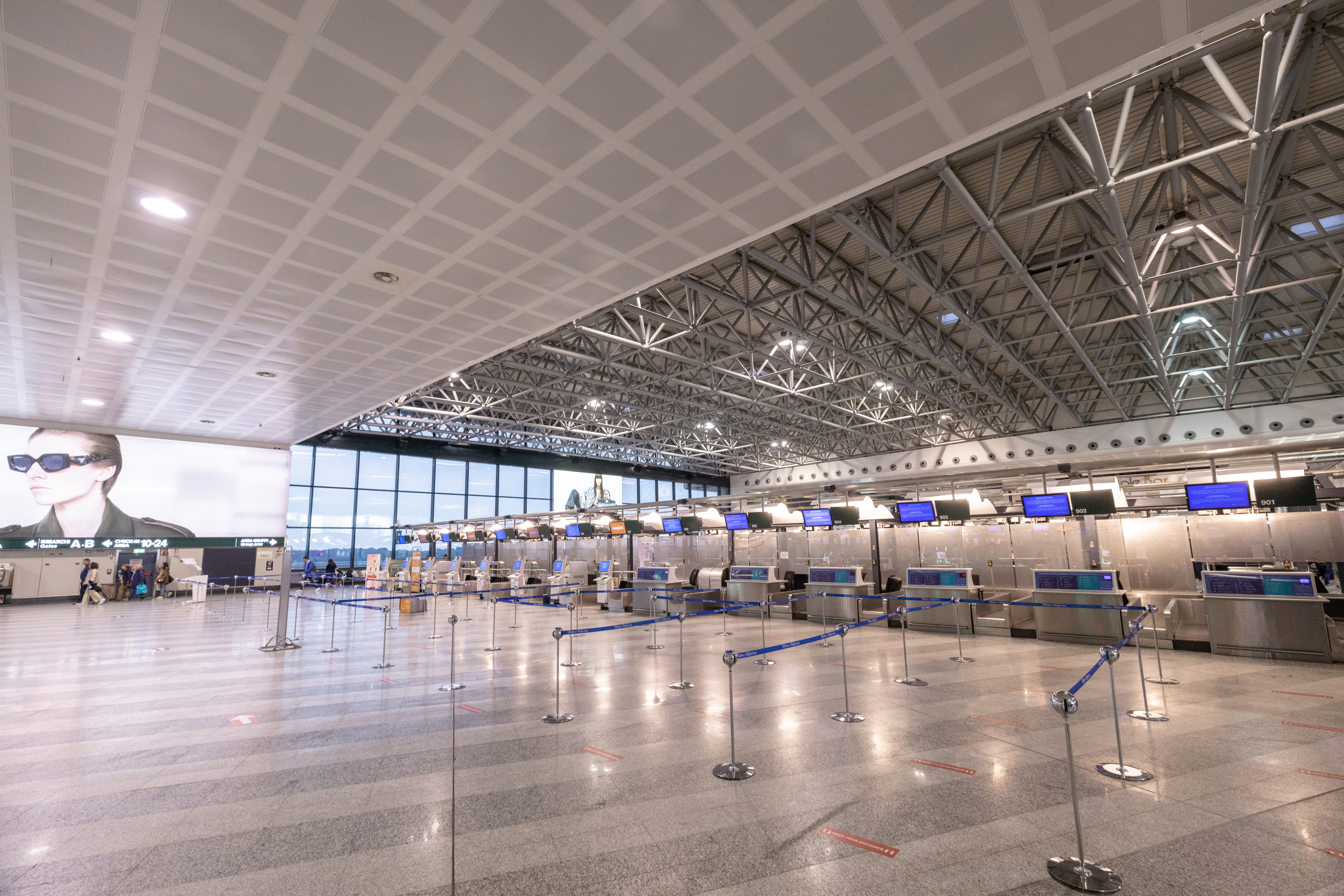
Interior of Terminal 1

=== Early years ===
Aviation activities on the site of today's Malpensa Airport began on 27 May 1910, when the Caproni brothers flew their Ca.1 biplane. In the following years, many aircraft prototypes took off from the same site; eventually, it was decided to upgrade the farming patch to a more formal airfield. Both Gianni Caproni and Giovanni Agusta established factories on the new site; the airfield soon developed into the largest aircraft production centre in Italy. During the 1920s and 1930s, the airfield hosted two squadrons of the Regia Aeronautica Italiana (Italian Air Force). It was for advanced flight training held by an air bombing and gunnery school.

In September 1943, Malpensa airfield was taken over by the Luftwaffe after northern Italy was invaded by Nazi Germany. Soon after their arrival, the Germans laid the airfield's first concrete runway. It was designated as Flugpatz 368 by the Luftwaffe and ANR Aeroporto N. 6 by the Regia Aeronautica, and was known by a number of names including Gallarate, Gallarate-Malpensa, Cascina-Malpensa, Cascina Costa, Vizzola Ticono, Gaspare Bolla, Adalberto Campaci, and Luigi Bailo. The airfield was split into three sides, which was the Malpensa side on the north, Cascina Costa side on the east, and Vizolla Ticono side on the west. This design was done intentionally to give the impression of three airfields to Allied forces. On the Vizolla Ticono side, a distribution and maintenance depot was installed for Bf 109 fighters, and it was also used by the Aeronautica Nazionale Repubblicana. There were 3 medium hangars and 5 buildings for repair workshops and stores. On the Gallarate side, there were 3 large hangars were on the northern boundary, and 1 large and 1 medium hangars on the western boundary. On the Cascina Costa side, there were 2 medium hangars and 2 buildings for workshops.

After the cessation of hostilities during the Second World War, manufacturers and politicians of the Milan and Varese regions, led by banker Benigno Ajroldi of Banca Alto Milanese, restored the airfield. They aimed to make it an industrial fulcrum for the post-war recovery of Italy. The main runway, heavily damaged by German troops as they retreated from northern Italy, was rebuilt and extended to 1,800 m (5,900 ft). A small wooden terminal was constructed to protect goods and passengers from bad weather.

=== 2010s ===
Responding to Alitalia's pullout, the operator SEA launched an all-out publicity programme and aggressively marketed Malpensa Airport around the world. As a result, from 2008 to 2011, a total of 34 new passenger and cargo routes were added to Malpensa's network.

The low-cost carrier EasyJet made Malpensa its main base after London Gatwick, with more than 20 of its Airbus A319s and Airbus A320s based there. Competitor Ryanair confirmed plans to open an operating base at Malpensa from December 2015, initially with one aircraft.

In 2014, a contract was awarded for the extension of the railway line from Terminal 1 to Terminal 2. The line was opened in December 2016. The new Malpensa Terminal 2 railway station is 200 m (660 ft) north of the T2 arrivals hall, that is accessed by an outdoor covered walkway.

=== 2020s ===
On 5 July 2024, Italian minister of infrastructure and transport Matteo Salvini announced that Malpensa Airport would officially be named after former prime minister Silvio Berlusconi, following ENAC's approval of a request by the regional government of Lombardy from 2023. ENAC officially changed the name to Aeroporto internazionale Milano Malpensa "Silvio Berlusconi" on 11 July 2024.

On 20 August 2025, the airport was partially evacuated after a man set fire to a check-in area and attacked digital screens with a hammer before being subdued and detained.

== Terminals ==
Malpensa Airport has two passenger terminals and they are connected by free airport shuttle buses and trains. Passengers can travel to and from the airport using both train and shuttle bus services. The main operators serving these routes are the Malpensa Express rail service operated by Trenord, and bus companies including Flibco and Autostradale.

=== Terminal 1 ===
Terminal 1, which opened in 1998, is the newer, larger and more prominent terminal. The terminal is divided into three sections and handles most passengers on scheduled as well as charter flights:

- Concourse A handles domestic and intra-Schengen flights.
- Concourse B handles non-Schengen and intercontinental flights.
- Concourse C (B2), opened in January 2012, handles non-Schengen, intercontinental flights and security-sensitive flights to the USA and Israel.

=== Terminal 2 ===
Terminal 2 is the older terminal. It was closed in 2020 due to the COVID-19 pandemic and reopened on 31 May 2023. easyJet has been the sole tenant of Terminal 2 since all charter services, which were previously based in Terminal 2, moved to Terminal 1 upon the latter's opening.

== Airlines and destinations ==
=== Passenger ===
The following airlines operate regular scheduled, seasonal and charter flights to and from Malpensa:

Airlines	Destinations
Aegean Airlines	Athens, Thessaloniki
Aer Lingus	Seasonal: Dublin
Aeroitalia	Salerno
Aeroméxico	Mexico City–Benito Juárez (begins 29 March 2027)
Air Algérie	Algiers
Air Cairo	Cairo, Sharm El Sheikh; Seasonal: El Alamein, Hurghada
Air Canada	Montréal–Trudeau
Air China	Beijing–Capital, Beijing–Daxing, Chengdu–Tianfu, Shanghai–Pudong
Air Corsica	Seasonal: Figari
Air Dolomiti	Frankfurt, Munich
Air Europa	Madrid
Air France	Paris–Charles de Gaulle
Air Horizont	Seasonal charter: Olbia
Air India	Delhi
Air Serbia	Belgrade
airBaltic	Riga
All Nippon Airways	Tokyo–Haneda
American Airlines	Miami, New York–JFK; Seasonal: Philadelphia
Arkia	Tel Aviv
Asiana Airlines	Seoul–Incheon
Atlantic Airways	Vágar (resumes 5 May 2027)
Azerbaijan Airlines	Baku
BeOnd	Malé, Red Sea
British Airways	London–Heathrow
Brussels Airlines	Brussels
Bulgaria Air	Seasonal: Sofia
Cathay Pacific	Hong Kong
China Eastern Airlines	Shanghai–Pudong, Xi'an
Condor	Frankfurt
Croatia Airlines	Seasonal: Split
Cyprus Airways	Larnaca
Delta Air Lines	Atlanta, New York–JFK; Seasonal: Boston
easyJet	A Coruña, Amsterdam, Athens, Barcelona, Bari, Berlin, Bilbao, Birmingham (resumes 29 March 2027), Bordeaux, Brindisi, Bristol, Cagliari, Catania, Düsseldorf, Edinburgh, Fuerteventura, Giza, Hamburg, Hurghada, Lamezia Terme, Lanzarote, Lisbon, London–Gatwick, London–Luton, Luxor, Málaga, Marsa Alam, Manchester, Marrakesh, Nantes, Naples, Olbia, Palermo, Palma de Mallorca, Paris–Charles de Gaulle, Paris–Orly, Porto, Prague, Rabat, Reykjavík–Keflavík, Sal, Seville, Sharm El Sheikh, Strasbourg, Tbilisi, Tenerife–South, Thessaloniki, Toulouse; Seasonal: Biarritz, Chania, Corfu, Gran Canaria, Harstad/Narvik, Heraklion, Ibiza, Kefalonia, Kittilä, Kos, Lampedusa, Luxembourg, Menorca, Mykonos, Nuremberg (begins 27 November 2026), Pantelleria (begins 26 May 2027), Preveza/Lefkada, Rennes (begins 7 May 2027), Rhodes, Rovaniemi, Santorini, Skiathos, Tromsø, Zakynthos
Egyptair	Cairo; Seasonal: Luxor
El Al	Tel Aviv
Emirates	Dubai–International, New York–JFK
Ethiopian Airlines	Addis Ababa, Zurich
Etihad Airways	Abu Dhabi
EVA Air	Taipei–Taoyuan
Eurowings	Cologne/Bonn, Düsseldorf, Hamburg; Seasonal: Hannover, Stuttgart
Finnair	Helsinki
Fly2Galicia	Santiago de Compostela (begins 1 December 2026)
Flynas	Seasonal: Riyadh
FlyOne	Chișinău, Yerevan
Gulf Air	Bahrain; Seasonal: Geneva, Nice
Hainan Airlines	Chongqing, Guiyang, Shenzhen
Iberia	Madrid
Icelandair	Seasonal: Reykjavík–Keflavík
Israir	Tel Aviv
JetBlue	Seasonal: Boston
Jettime	Copenhagen
Juneyao Air	Zhengzhou
Korean Air	Seoul–Incheon
Kuwait Airways	Kuwait City
La Compagnie	Newark
LATAM Brasil	São Paulo–Guarulhos
LOT Polish Airlines	Warsaw–Chopin
Lufthansa	Frankfurt, Munich
Luxair	Luxembourg
MedSky Airways	Tripoli–Mitiga
Middle East Airlines	Beirut
Neos	Boa Vista, Cairo, Cancún, Dakar–Diass, Fuerteventura, Gran Canaria, Havana, La Romana, Luxor, Malé, Marsa Alam, Mombasa, Montego Bay, Nosy Bé, Sal, Sharm El Sheikh, Tel Aviv, Tenerife–South, Zanzibar; Seasonal: Brindisi, Cagliari, Cartagena, Catania, Chania, Comiso, Corfu, Cozumel (begins 24 December 2026), Djerba, Enfidha, Heraklion, Ibiza, Karpathos, Kos, Kilimanjaro, Lamezia Terme, Larnaca, Marsa Matruh, Menorca, Monastir, Muscat, Mykonos, Olbia, Palma de Mallorca, Patras, Phuket, Punta Cana, Rhodes, Rovaniemi, Salalah, Samos, Skiathos, Seasonal charter: Dubai–Al Maktoum (resumes 19 December 2026), Pointe-à-Pitre
Nesma Airlines	Seasonal: Cairo
Norwegian Air Shuttle	Oslo, Stockholm–Arlanda
Nouvelair	Tunis; Seasonal charter: Djerba, Monastir
Oman Air	Muscat
Qanot Sharq	Seasonal: Tashkent, Urgench
Qatar Airways	Doha
Polaris Airlines	Chișinău
Riyadh Air	Riyadh (begins 16 December 2026)
Royal Air Maroc	Casablanca
Royal Jordanian	Amman–Queen Alia
Ryanair	Alghero, Alicante, Barcelona, Bari, Berlin, Bratislava, Brindisi, Bucharest–Otopeni, Budapest, Cagliari, Catania, Crotone, Dublin, Edinburgh, Fuerteventura, Funchal, Gdansk, Gran Canaria, Gothenburg, Kraków, Lamezia Terme, Lanzarote, London–Stansted, Madrid, Málaga, Malta, Manchester, Marrakesh, Naples, Palermo, Palma de Mallorca, Paris Beauvais, Pescara, Plovdiv, Porto, Reggio Calabria, Seville, Tallinn, Tenerife–South, Tirana, Trapani, Valencia, Vienna, Warsaw–Modlin; Seasonal: Agadir, Athens, Corfu, Heraklion, Kos, Santorini, Zadar
Saudia	Jeddah; Seasonal: Riyadh
Scandinavian Airlines	Copenhagen, Oslo, Stockholm–Arlanda; Seasonal: Bergen, Stavanger
Singapore Airlines	Singapore
Sky Express	Athens
SunExpress	Izmir; Seasonal: Antalya
Swiss International Air Lines	Zurich
TAP Air Portugal	Lisbon
Thai Airways International	Bangkok–Suvarnabhumi
Transavia	Paris–Orly
Tunisair	Tunis
Turkish Airlines	Istanbul
Turkmenistan Airlines	Ashgabat
Twin Jet	Lyon, Marseille
United Airlines	Newark, Washington–Dulles (begins 29 May 2027); Seasonal: Chicago-O'Hare
Uzbekistan Airways	Tashkent, Urgench
Vietnam Airlines	Hanoi
Vueling	Barcelona, Bilbao; Seasonal: Ibiza
Wizz Air	Agadir, Alicante, Barcelona, Berlin (begins 14 December 2026), Bilbao, Brașov, Bucharest–Otopeni, Budapest, Cagliari (begins 14 December 2026), Catania, Chișinău, Cluj-Napoca, Comiso, Dortmund, Gdańsk, Giza, Jeddah, Kraków, Kutaisi, Lamezia Terme, Larnaca, London–Luton, Madrid, Málaga, Marrakesh, Naples, Palermo, Podgorica, Porto, Pristina, Reykjavik–Keflavík, Santander, Seville, Sharm El Sheikh, Suceava, Tel Aviv Tenerife–South, Tirana, Valencia, Vilnius, Warsaw–Chopin, Yerevan, Zaragoza; Seasonal: Corfu, Heraklion, Lampedusa, Marsa Alam, Olbia, Palma de Mallorca, Skiathos, Tromsø (begins 15 December 2026), Zakynthos

=== Cargo ===
The following airlines operate regular cargo services to and from Malpensa:

Airlines	Destinations	Refs
Amazon Air	Cagliari, Catania, Leipzig/Halle	
Asiana Cargo	Almaty, Seoul–Incheon	
Atlas Air	Amsterdam, Chicago–O'Hare, Liège, San Juan, Seoul–Incheon, Tokyo–Narita	
Cargolux	Luxembourg	
Cathay Cargo	Frankfurt, Hong Kong	
DHL Aviation	Ancona, Athens, Bahrain, Barcelona, Brussels, Budapest, Cincinnati, Cologne/Bonn, East Midlands, Leipzig/Halle, Naples, Paris–Charles de Gaulle, Pisa, Seoul–Incheon, Thessaloniki, Vitoria, Zagreb	
Egyptair Cargo	Cairo	
Emirates SkyCargo	Amsterdam, Dubai–Al Maktoum	
Ethiopian Airlines Cargo	Addis Ababa	
Geosky	Charter: Ezhou	
Korean Air Cargo	Seoul–Incheon	
Lufthansa Cargo	Frankfurt	
MSC Air Cargo	Tokyo–Narita	
Nippon Cargo Airlines	Amsterdam, Tokyo–Narita	
Qatar Airways Cargo	Doha, Munich	
Saudia Cargo	Jeddah, Riyadh	
Silk Way West Airlines	Baku	
Turkish Cargo	Istanbul	
Turkmenistan Airlines	Ashgabat	

Milan Malpensa Airport passenger destinations map (19 July 2026)

== Statistics ==
=== Traffic ===
Milan Malpensa Airport – traffic information
Years	Movements	% variation	Passengers	% variation	Cargo (tons)	% variation
2000	249,107	▲13.3	20,716,815	▲22.1	301,045	▲4.6
2001	236,409	▼5.1	18,570,494	▼10.4	323,707	▲7.5
2002	214,886	▼9.1	17,441,250	▼6.1	328,241	▲1.4
2003	213,554	▼0.6	17,621,585	▲1	362,587	▲10.5
2004	218,048	▲2.1	18,554,874	▲5.3	361,237	▲13.1
2005	227,718	▲4.4	19,630,514	▲5.8	384,752	▲6.5
2006	247,456	▲8.7	21,767,267	▲10.9	419,128	▲8,9
2007	267,941	▲8.3	23,885,391	▲9.7	486,666	▲16.1
2008	218,476	▼18.5	19,221,632	▼19.5	415,952	▼14.5
2009	187,551	▼14.2	17,551,635	▼8.7	344,047	▼17.3
2010	193,771	▲3.3	18,947,808	▲8	432,674	▲25.8
2011	190,838	▼1.5	19,303,131	▲1.8	450,446	▲4.1
2012	174,892	▼8.4	18,537,301	▼4	414,317	▼8
2013	164,745	▼5.8	17,955,075	▼3.1	430,343	▲3.9
2014	166,749	▲1.2	18,853,203	▲5	469,657	▲9.1
2015	160,484	▼3.8	18,582,043	▼1.4	511,191	▲8.8
2016	166,842	▲4	19,420,690	▲4.5	548,767	▲7.4
2017	178,953	▲7.3	22,169,167	▲14.2	589,719	▲7.5
2018	194,515	▲8.7	24,725,490	▲11.5	572,774.8	▼2.9
2019	234,054	▲20.3	28,846,299	▲16.7	558,481.5	▼2.5
2020	92,432	▼60.5	7,241,766	▼74.9	516,739.6	▼7.5
2021	118,341	▲28.0	9,622,464	▲32.9	747,242	▲44.6
2022	186,626	▲57.7	21,347,652	▲121.9	721,255	▼3.5
2023	201,958	▲8.2	26,076,714	▲22.2	671,908	▼6.8
2024	214,511	▲6.2	28,910,368	▲10.9	731,641	▲8.9
2025	226,304	▲5.3	31,234,229	▲8.7	764,171	▲4.2

=== Busiest domestic routes ===
Busiest domestic routes to/from Milan Malpensa (2023)
Rank	Rank var. (prev. year)	Airport	Passengers	Airline(s)
1	Steady	Catania, Sicily	▼1,066,600	easyJet, Neos Air, Ryanair, Wizz Air
2	Steady	Palermo, Sicily	▼809,824	easyJet, Ryanair
3	Steady	Naples, Campania	▼681,008	easyJet, Ryanair
4	Steady	Bari, Apulia	▼494,199	easyJet, Ryanair
5	Steady	Brindisi, Apulia	▼436,195	easyJet, Neos Air, Ryanair
6	Steady	Olbia, Sardinia	▲340,245	easyJet, Neos Air, Wizz Air
7	▲1	Lamezia Terme, Calabria	▲267,827	easyJet, Neos Air, Ryanair
8	▼1	Cagliari, Sardinia	▼263,010	easyJet, Neos Air, Ryanair

=== Busiest EU routes ===
Busiest EU routes from/to Milan Malpensa (2023)
Rank	Rank var. (prev. year)	Airport	Passengers	Airline(s)
1	Steady	Barcelona, Spain	▲996,626	easyJet, Ryanair, Singapore Airlines, Vueling, Wizz Air
2	Steady	Paris–Charles de Gaulle, France	▲824,257	Air France, easyJet
3	Steady	Madrid, Spain	▲723,736	Air Europa, Iberia, Ryanair, Wizz Air
4	Steady	Lisbon, Portugal	▲607,425	easyJet, TAP Portugal
5	▲2	Athens, Thessaloniki, Greece	▲520,479	Aegean Airlines, easyJet, Ryanair, Sky Express, Wizz Air
6	▼1	Amsterdam, Netherlands	▲489,345	easyJet, KLM,
7	▼1	Vienna, Austria	▲382,004	Austrian Airlines, Ryanair
8	▼1	Frankfurt, Germany	▲334,927	Air Dolomiti, Lufthansa
9	▲7	Prague, Czech Republic	▲328,857	Czech Airlines, easyJet, Wizz Air
10	▲1	Copenhagen, Denmark	▲315,126	easyJet, Scandinavian Airlines
11	▲2	Málaga, Spain	▲262,043	easyJet, Ryanair
12	▲2	Paris–Orly, France	▲260,554	Transavia, Vueling
13	▼1	Munich, Germany	▲235,293	Air Dolomiti, easyJet, Lufthansa
14	▲3	Porto, Portugal	▲232,153	easyJet, Ryanair, TAP Portugal
15	▲5	Budapest, Hungary	▲222,141	Ryanair, Wizz Air
16	▲6	Palma de Mallorca, Spain	▲217,238	easyJet, Neos Air, Ryanair
17	▼2	Ibiza, Spain	▲201,775	easyJet, Neos Air, Vueling
18	Steady	Helsinki, Finland	▲196,803	Finnair
19	▼9	Tenerife, Spain	▼195,314	easyJet, Neos, Ryanair, Wizz Air

==== Busiest non-EU routes ====
Busiest non-EU routes from/to Milan Malpensa (2023)
Rank	Rank var. (prev. year)	City	Passengers	Airline(s)
1	Steady	New York–JFK, New York, United States	▲981,030	American Airlines, Delta Air Lines, Emirates, ITA Airways, Neos Air
2	Steady	London–Gatwick, England	▲691,156	easyJet, Wizz Air
3	Steady	Dubai–International, United Arab Emirates	▲558,974	Emirates
4	Steady	Istanbul, Turkey	▲520,763	Turkish Airlines
5	▲2	Doha, Qatar	▲486,648	Qatar Airways
6	▼1	Tirana, Albania	▲390,687	Air Albania, Wizz Air
7	▲1	Tel Aviv, Israel	▲360,694	Arkia, easyJet, El Al, Neos Air, Wizz Air
8	▼2	London–Stansted, England	▲354,963	Ryanair
9	Steady	London–Heathrow, England	▲315,813	British Airways
10	▲1	Sharm El Sheikh, Egypt	▲284,264	Air Horizont, AlbaStar, easyJet, Neos Air, Wizz Air
11	▼1	Manchester, England	▲260,934	easyJet, Ryanair
12	Steady	Cairo, Egypt	▲247,835	Air Cairo, Egypt Air, Neos Air
13	▲4	Marrakesh, Morocco	▲195,444	easyJet, Ryanair, Wizz Air
14	▼1	Abu Dhabi, United Arab Emirates	▲195,186	Etihad Airways
15	▼1	Newark, New Jersey, United States	▲194,795	La Compagnie, United Airlines
16	▲6	Marsa Alam, Egypt	▲186,419	Air Cairo, AlbaStar, easyJet, Neos Air
17	▼2	São Paulo-Guarulhos, Brazil	▲161,249	LATAM Brasil
18	▲3	Reykjavík, Iceland	▲158,512	easyJet, Icelandair, Wizz Air
19	▲13	Jeddah, Saudi Arabia	▲147,815	Saudia, Wizz Air
20	▼1	Oslo, Norway	▲144,999	easyJet, Norwegian Air Shuttle, Scandinavian Airlines
21	▼3	Casablanca, Morocco	▲134,521	Royal Air Maroc

=== Movements by country ===
European Union countries with passenger movements from/to Milan Malpensa Airport (2018)
Rank	Rank var. (prev. year)	Country	Passengers 2018
1	Steady	Italy	▲4,093,221
2	Steady	Spain	▲2,559,852
3	▲1	Germany	▲1,805,491
4	▼1	United Kingdom	▼1,717,631
5	Steady	France	▲1,396,510
6	Steady	The Netherlands	▲841,773
7	Steady	Greece	▲652,323
8	Steady	Portugal	▲644,147
9	▲2	Austria	▲377,548
10	Steady	Denmark	▲367,156
11	▼2	Belgium	▲337,648
12	Steady	Czech Republic	▲304,878
13	Steady	Hungary	▲240,128
14	▲1	Poland	▲232,147
15	▼1	Finland	▲198,838
16	Steady	Luxembourg	▼147,866
17	Steady	Romania	▼119,021
18	Steady	Bulgaria	▼114,080
19	Steady	Sweden	▲109,465
20	▲1	Lithuania	▲75,768
21	▼1	Ireland	▲71,749
22	▲1	Estonia	▲36,937
23	▼1	Cyprus	▲34,714
24	Steady	Malta	▲10,198

== Ground transport ==
=== Rail ===
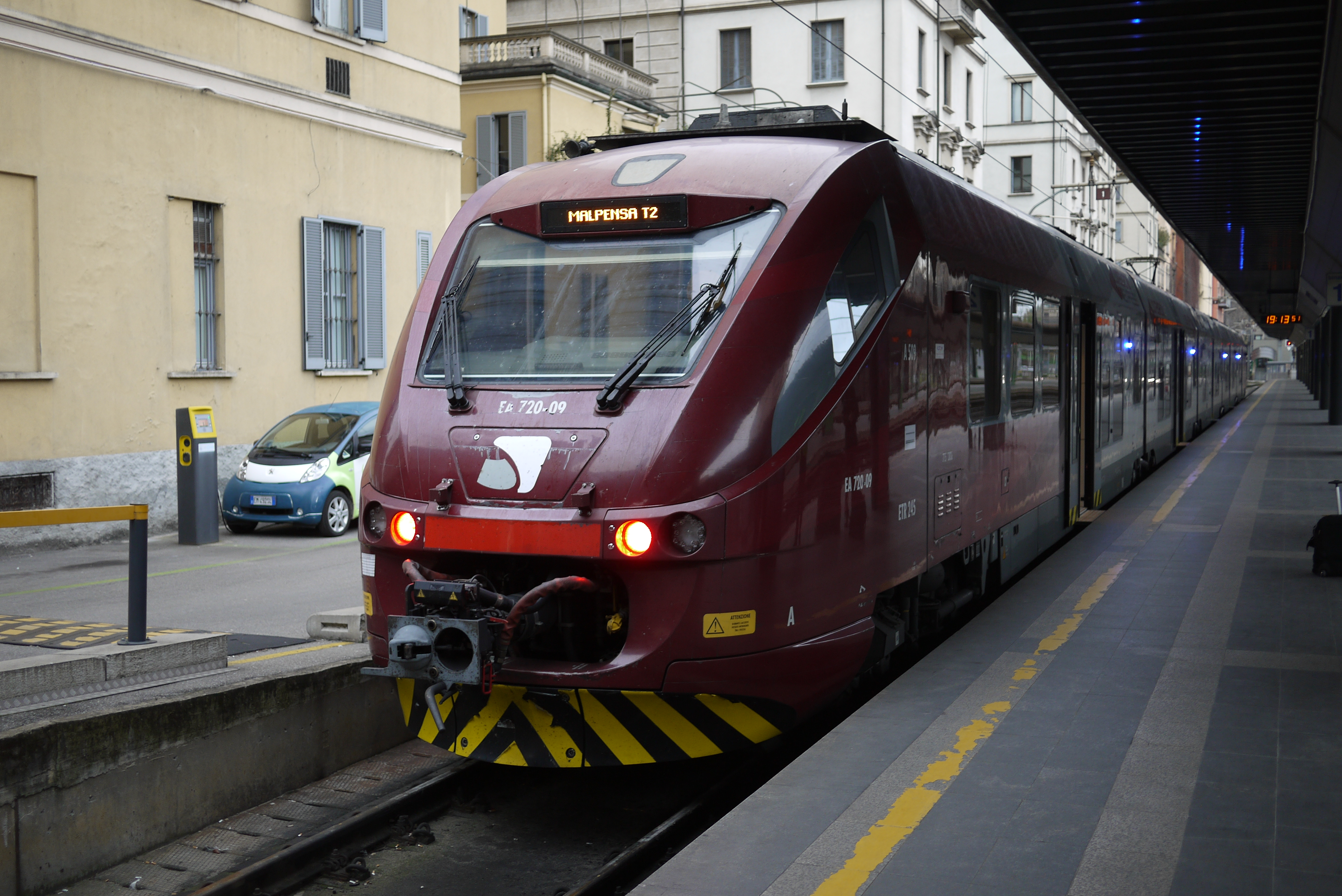
Malpensa Express at Milan Cadorna station platform 1

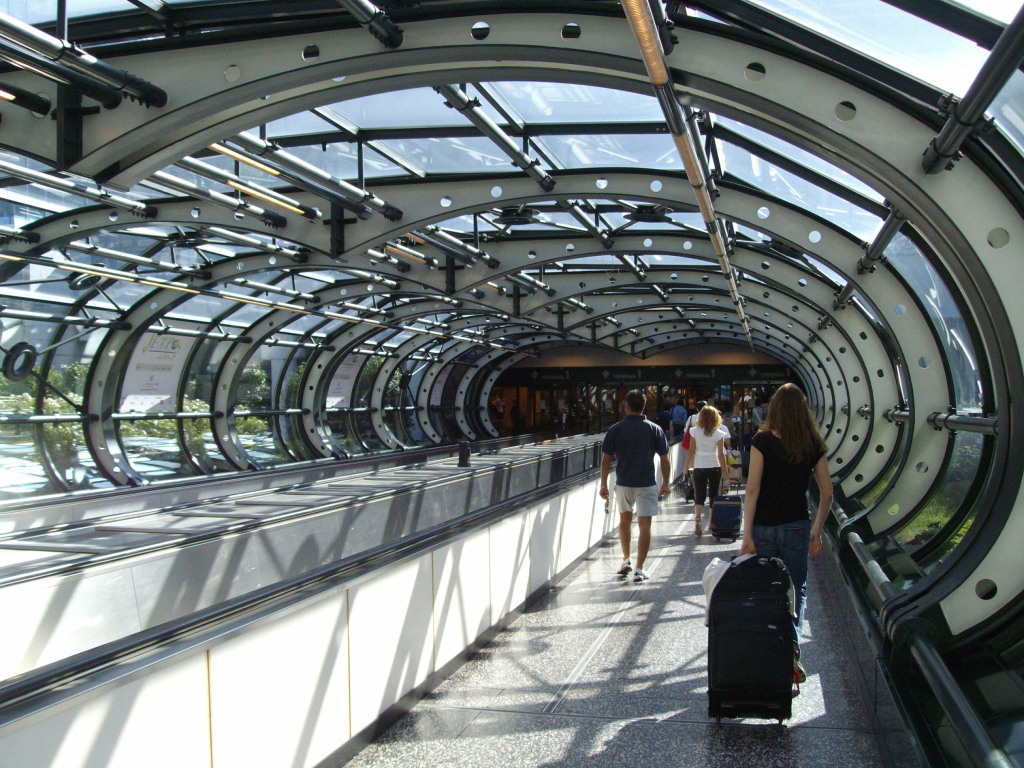
Connection between Terminal 1 and its railway station

The airport is served by two train stations, one at each terminal.

==== Malpensa Express ====
Malpensa Express is a direct train connection between Terminal 2, Terminal 1 and Milan's city centre.

As of 2019, its service is based on a clock-face timetable with four services per hour in both directions: two run between the two airport terminals and Milan Cadorna station; the other two between the two airport terminals, Milan Garibaldi and Milan Centrale stations. All services call at Busto Arsizio Nord, Saronno (connections for Como, Novara and Varese) and Milan Bovisa stations.

The journey time ranges between 30 and 50 minutes, depending on the type of service and the number of stops.

==== Other train services ====
TiLo operates services to Bellinzona in Switzerland.

Milan's Suburban Line S10 (Milano Rogoredo–Milano Bovisa) ran to Malpensa Airport/Aeroporto from June 2010. Trains called at Ferno, Busto Arsizio, Castellanza, Rescaldina, Saronno, Milano Bovisa, Milano Lancetti, Milano Porta Garibaldi M2-M5, Milano Repubblica M3, Milano Porta Venezia M1, Milano Dateo and Milano Porta Vittoria. The service was terminated in October 2012.

The Malpensa – Varese – Mendrisio (CH) – Lugano (CH) line provides a direct connection between Malpensa Airport/Aeroporto and the south-eastern part of Switzerland. There are plans to connect Gallarate Station and Milan's Centrale Station (FS), which is currently a terminus station with no through tracks, to allow more convenient access to high-speed international lines.

=== Bus ===
- Flibco, Malpensa Shuttle and Malpensa Bus Express connect the airport to Milan Central station (Trenitalia's National Railway hub) and for Milan's Metro network. The shuttle bus calls at Terminals 1 and 2, Busto Arsizio and Milan Fair (on request). Journey time is 60–70 minutes.
- A free, 24-hour shuttle bus provides access to Terminal 2 from Terminal 1. The bus leaves every 7 minutes. Journey time is 15–20 minutes.
- Malpensa Airport has direct coach connections with several cities in Northern Italy, including Como (Flibco), Domodossola (Autoservizi Comazzi), Genoa (Volpi), the Lake Maggiore area (Alibus), Novara (Flibco), and Turin (Flibco; Airport Bus).

=== Road ===
Malpensa Airport is accessible by a four-lane motorway to the A8 (connecting Switzerland to Milan) and by a five-lane motorway to the A4 (connecting Turin/Torino, Verona, Venice and Triest/Trieste). Local access to the airport is provided by the State Road SS336 from Busto Arsizio and by the State Road SS336dir from Magenta.
