= Novara Nord railway station =

Railway station in Piedmont, Italy

Novara Nord
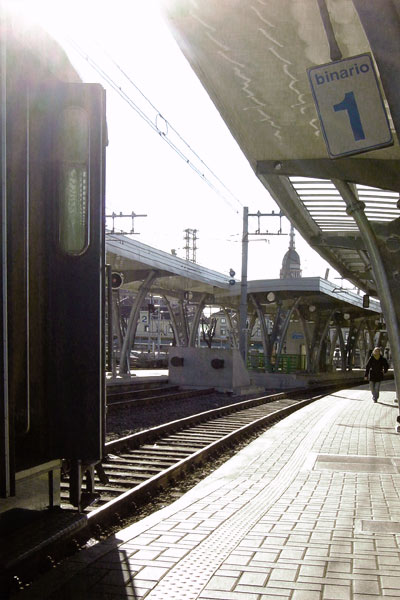

General information
- Location: Novara, Novara, Piedmont; Italy
- Coordinates: 45°27′09″N 08°37′37″E
- Operator: Ferrovienord
- Line: Milan–Saronno–Novara
- Distance: 61.176 km (38.013 mi) from Milan
- Train operators: Trenord
- Connections: Novara railway station

History
- Opened: 25 June 1887; 139 years ago
- Rebuilt: 2 April 2005; 21 years ago
Location
- Location within Lombardy Location within Northern Italy Location within Italy

Novara Nord is a railway station in Italy. It is the end of the Saronno–Novara railway.

It serves the city of Novara, and is joined by a junction track to the Novara railway station, managed by Ferrovie dello Stato.

== Services ==
Novara Nord is served by the regional trains operated by the lombard railway company Trenord.

== See also ==
- Novara railway station

Preceding station	Ferrovie Nord Milano	Following station
Terminus	Trenord; R27	Galliate toward Milan Cadorna
