= Olona Valley =

Valley in Lombardy, Italy, carved by the Olona River

Coordinates: 45°43′47″N 8°52′03″E

Valle Olona
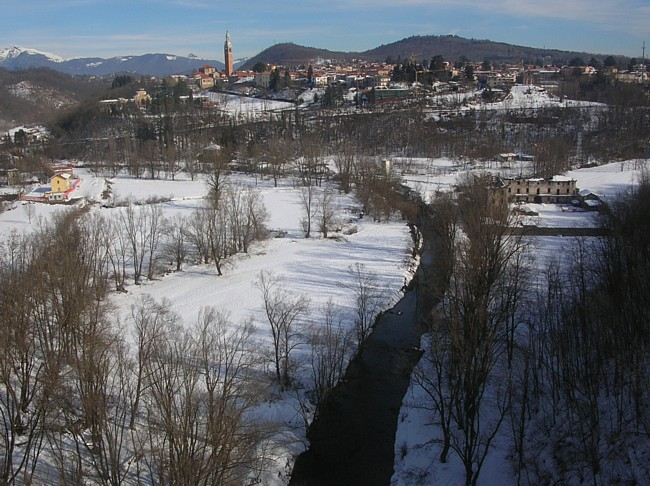
- The Valle Olona near Malnate.
- Floor elevation: 216–718 m (709–2,356 ft)

Geography
- Country: Italy
- State/Province: Lombardy
- District: Province of Varese
- Population centers: Varese, Induno Olona, Malnate, Vedano Olona, Lozza, Castiglione Olona, Lonate Ceppino, Gornate Olona, Castelseprio, Cairate, Solbiate Olona, Fagnano Olona, Gorla Maggiore, Gorla Minore, Olgiate Olona, Marnate, Castellanza
- River: Olona
- Interactive map of Valle Olona

The Valle Olona is a valley stretching from just south of Bregazzana, a hamlet of Varese, to Castellanza in northern Italy.

Carved by the Olona River, from which it takes its name, the valley formed during the Riss glaciation due to the erosive action of a glacier descending from Lake Lugano. Over subsequent centuries, the Olona River partially filled the valley's alluvial zones with gravel and sand, and later, through repeated flooding, deposited substantial sediment that now supports diverse plant life.

The Valle Olona typically features a valley floor devoid of settlements, except for Castegnate (one of two hamlets of Castellanza, located at the valley's outlet) and the hamlets of Gornate Olona, namely Torba and San Pancrazio. Farther north, one of the last inhabited areas is the Mulini di Gurone, which also hosts a dam designed to protect downstream settlements from Olona River floods.

Scattered across the valley floor and nestled among numerous wetlands and broadleaf tree forests that cloak the surrounding slopes are remnants of abandoned industrial complexes and several water mills along the Olona, once vital to local economies.

The valley also encompasses the route of the Valmorea railway, once abandoned but now repurposed as a cycling and pedestrian path between Castellanza and Castiglione Olona. Part of the line was refurbished to accommodate a tourist train between Malnate and Mendrisio until 2013. Plans are underway for the Ciclovia Olona Lura, a 165 km loop connecting the valley to the Lura stream along the European EuroVelo 5 route.

== Physical geography ==
=== Terrain ===
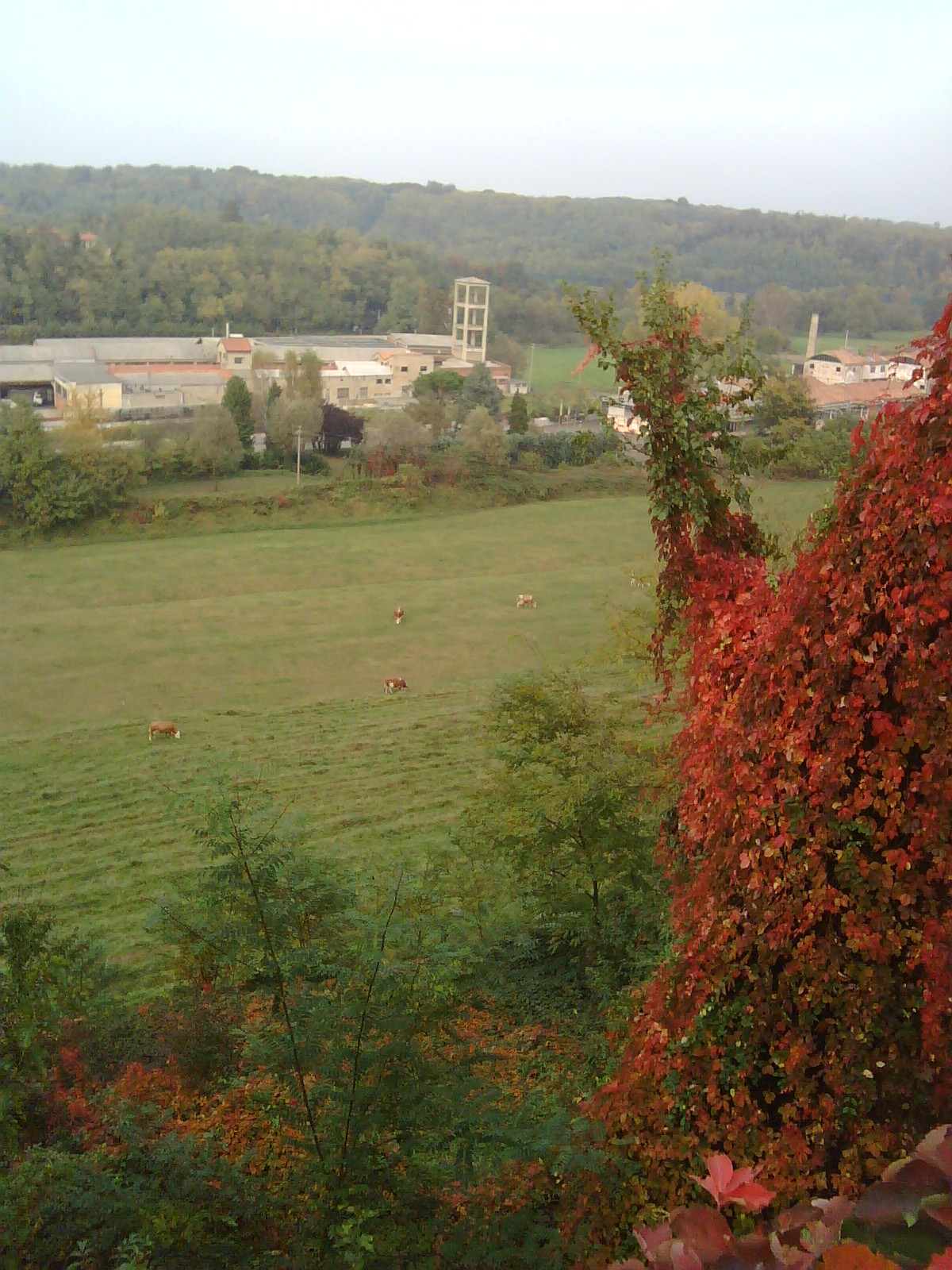
A view of the Valle Olona from the castle of Fagnano Olona. The Olona River flows within the tree line, facing industrial buildings.

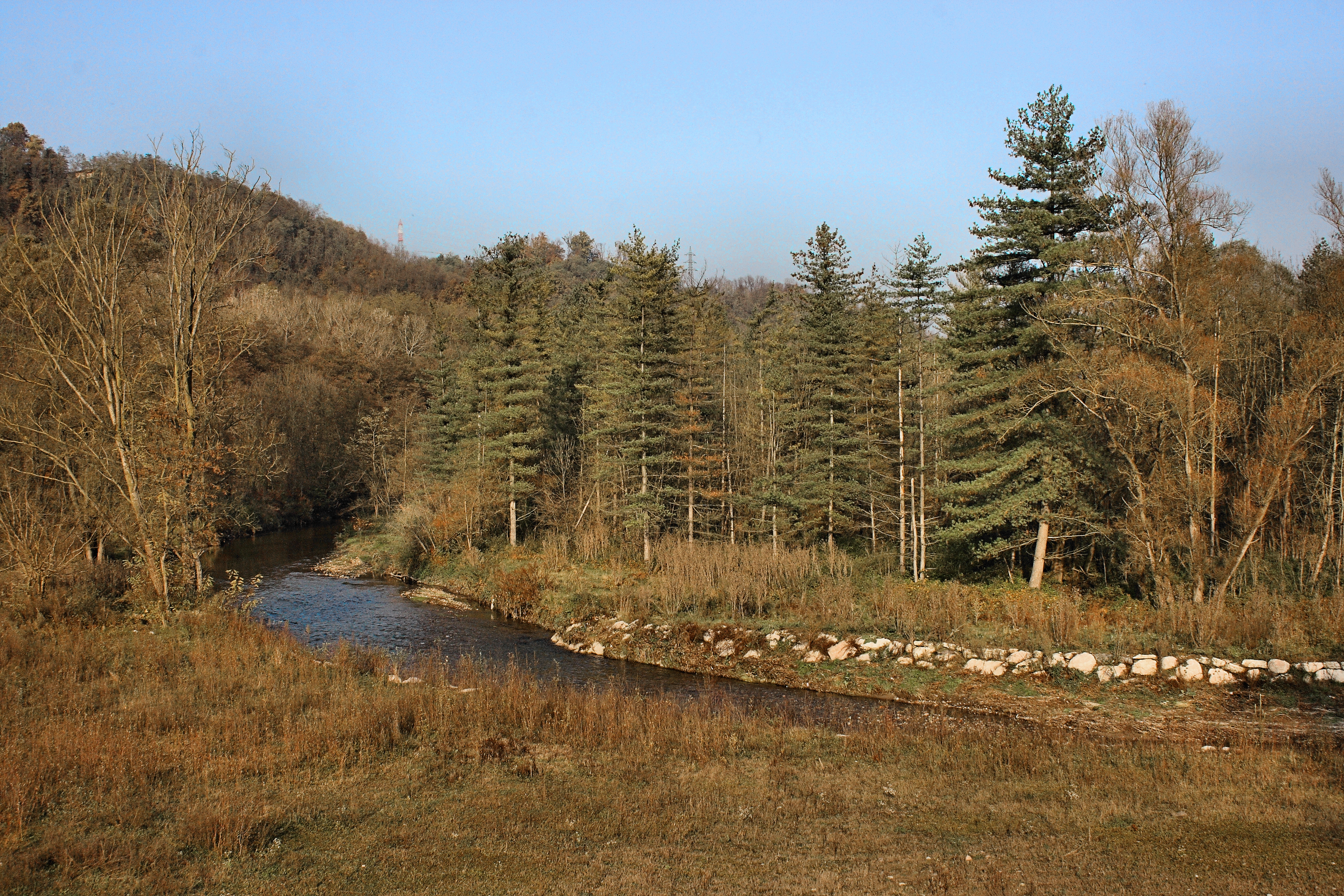
The Olona River near Gurone, a hamlet of Malnate, in the Province of Varese.

Located south of the Valmorea valley (carved by the Lanza stream) and the valley etched by the Bevera stream, the Valle Olona gathers waters from the Olona and its tributaries across the southeastern Province of Varese.

The Valle Olona begins south of Bregazzana, a hamlet of Varese, where the Olona branch from the Val di Rasa converges with the branch originating in the Valganna, forming a single waterway that flows to Milan, where it joins the Lambro Meridionale.

The aforementioned Lanza and Bevera streams merge with the Olona south of this confluence, as their initial courses are hydrologically distinct, with sources farther north and relatively distant from those of the Olona.

Besides its primary source at Fornaci della Riana in Rasa di Varese, a hamlet of Varese, the Olona emerges from five smaller springs, two in Val di Rasa and three in Valganna, which unite downstream of Bregazzana.

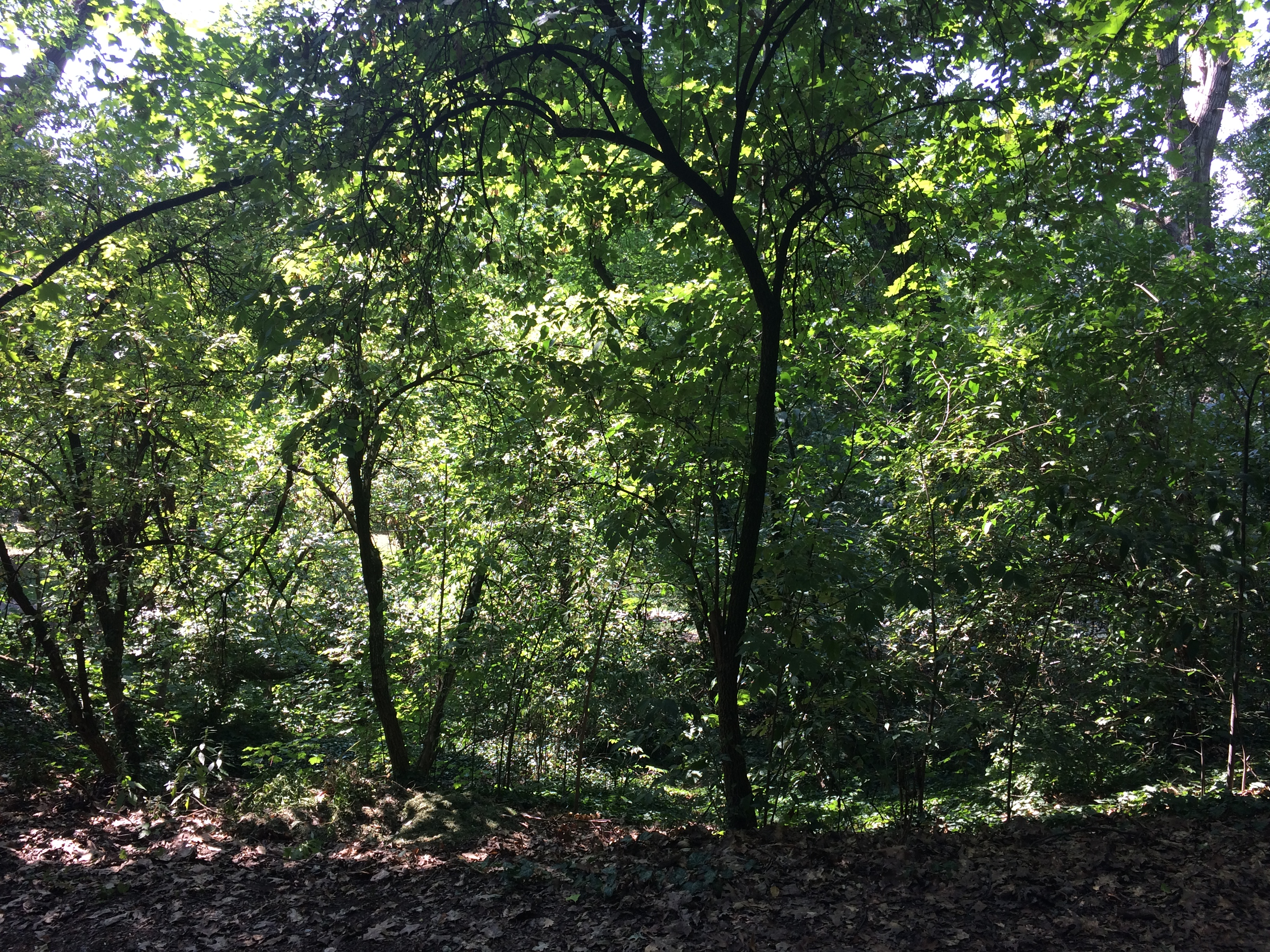
A glimpse of the "ronchi" in Legnano, within the namesake park. In Legnano, the morainic plateaus formed by the Olona are termed "ronchi".

After cutting southeast through the Province of Varese, the Valle Olona ends at Castellanza, where its slopes level off. From here, the Olona flows across a plain, transitioning from the earlier hilly and prealpine terrain. The valley's lowest point is at Castellanza (216 m a.s.l.), while its highest is Pian Valdes, peaking at 718 m a.s.l.

The valley's perimeter includes parts of the municipalities of Varese, Induno Olona, Malnate, Vedano Olona, Lozza, Castiglione Olona, Lonate Ceppino, Gornate Olona, Castelseprio, Cairate, Solbiate Olona, Fagnano Olona, Gorla Maggiore, Gorla Minore, Olgiate Olona, Marnate, and Castellanza, as well as areas of neighboring municipalities on the morainic plateaus within the Olona's hydrographic basin, such as Busto Arsizio and Tradate.

=== Hydrology ===
In its valley stretch, the Olona receives numerous tributaries rising from surrounding hills, including the Bevera, Lanza (also known as Ranza, Anza, Clivio, or Gaggiolo), Fogascè (or Gerre), Quadronna, Selvagna, Mornaga, Riale delle Selve, Marubbio, Valdessera, Riale San Pancrazio, Riale di Torba, Riale di Castelseprio, Rile, and Tenore.

The Valle Olona hosts several wetlands:

- The Stagno Buzonel, located on the valley floor between Castelseprio and Lonate Ceppino, fed by the Bozzone stream, which then joins the Olona.
- The Stagno di Cairate, at the border of Cairate and Lonate Ceppino, sustained by springs.
- The Refreddo or Fontanile Crotto, a stream originating at Crotto Valle Olona (on Castelseprio's valley floor) and merging with the Olona downstream.

=== Geology ===
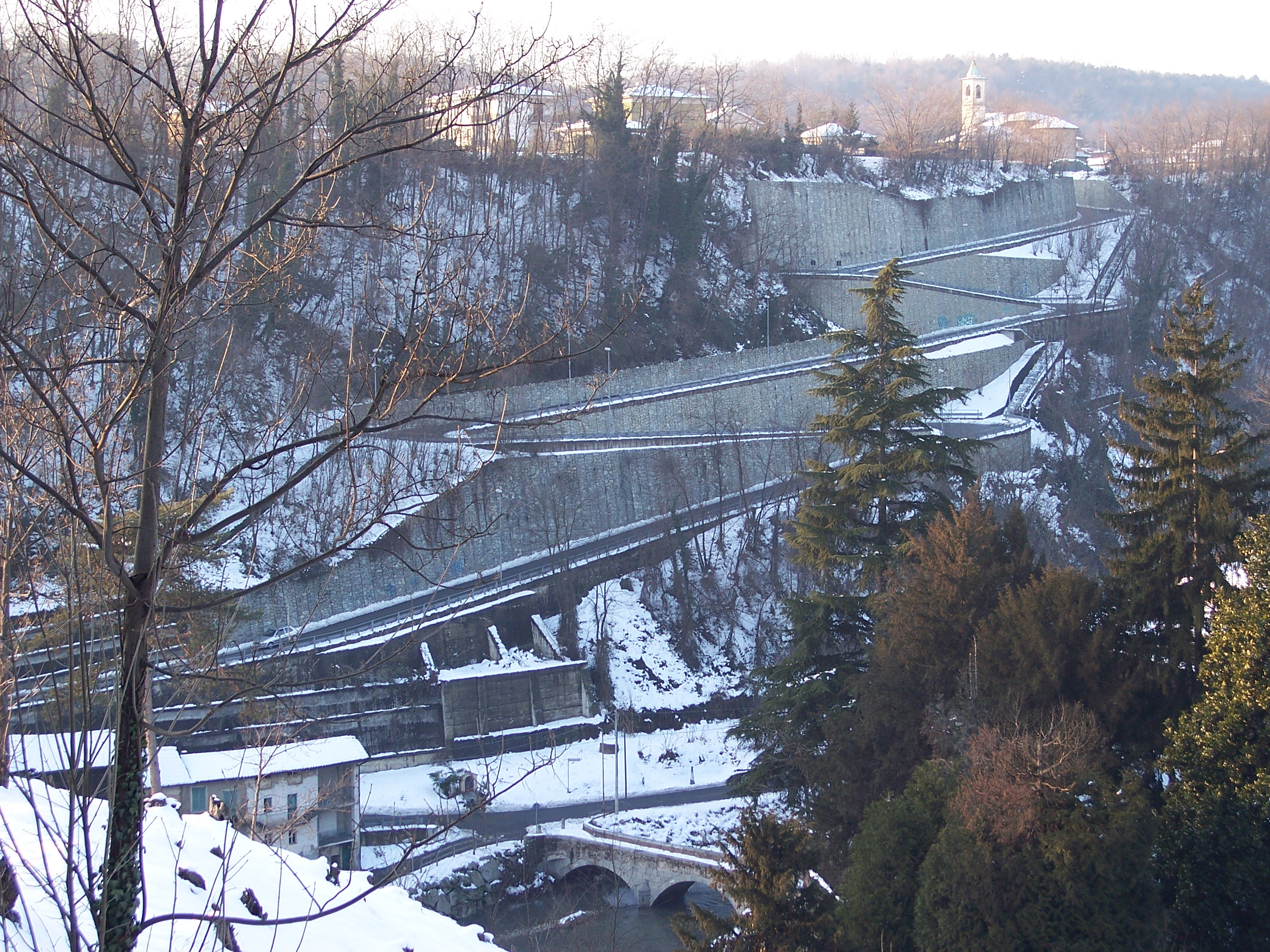
The "Piccolo Stelvio" between Castiglione Olona and Morazzone, named for its 153-meter elevation drop. It is a regular feature of the Coppa Bernocchi, a men's road cycling classic race starting and ending in Legnano.

Formed during the Riss glaciation by the erosive force of a glacier from Lake Lugano, the Valle Olona exhibits the characteristic U-shaped cross-section typical of glacially carved valleys. After the ice retreated, rivers and streams began to flow, initially filling parts of the alluvial zones with gravel and sand, and later depositing earthy sediments during repeated floods, fostering today's vegetation.

=== Climate ===
The Valle Olona experiences a continental climate with warm, moderately rainy summers and high humidity. Winters are cold, with weeks of frost, and occasional snow days.

Ventilation is generally poor, varying by location. In the northern valley, near the Prealpi Varesine, light breezes may clear the air, while in the Alto Milanese, especially in winter, fog persists due to stagnant conditions.

Climatological data from the Milan Malpensa weather station (named after Milan Malpensa Airport, itself derived from Cascina Malpensa) for 1961–1990 include:

MILANO MALPENSA (1961–1990)	Month												Season				Year
MILANO MALPENSA (1961–1990)	Jan	Feb	Mar	Apr	May	Jun	Jul	Aug	Sep	Oct	Nov	Dec	Winter	Spring	Summer	Fall	Year
Avg. max. temperature (°C)	6,1	8,6	13,1	17,0	21,3	25,5	28,6	27,6	24,0	18,2	11,2	6,9	7.2	17.1	27.2	17.8	17.3
Avg. min. temperature (°C)	−4,4	−2,5	0,4	4,3	9,0	12,6	15,3	14,8	11,5	6,4	0,7	−3,6	−3,5	4.6	14.2	6.2	5.4
Absolute max. temperature (°C)	21,0 (1982)	24,4 (1990)	25,4 (1990)	28,0 (1975)	30,7 (1979)	34,3 (1965)	37,0 (1983)	35,8 (1974)	33,9 (1988)	28,1 (1986)	22,8 (1964)	21,1 (1967)	24.4	30.7	37.0	33.9	37.0
Absolute min. temperature (°C)	−18,0 (1985)	−15,6 (1987)	−12,2 (1971)	−6,1 (1970)	−5,2 (1979)	0,6 (1974)	4,7 (1974)	4,7 (1979)	0,5 (1976)	−5,3 (1974)	−13,6 (1988)	−15,2 (1973)	−18,0	−12,2	0.6	−13,6	−18,0
Cloudiness (okta per day)	4,8	4,6	4,4	4,7	4,9	4,4	3,6	3,9	3,8	4,1	4,9	4,6	4.7	4.7	4.0	4.3	4.4
Precipitation (mm)	67,5	77,1	99,7	106,3	132,0	93,3	66,8	97,5	73,2	107,4	106,3	54,6	199.2	338.0	257.6	286.9	1 081,7
Rain days	6	6	8	9	10	9	6	8	6	7	8	6	18	27	23	21	89
Mean relative humidity (%)	78	76	69	73	74	74	74	73	74	77	80	80	78	72	73.7	77	75.2
Pressure at 0 m a.s.l. (hPa)	1 019	1 017	1 016	1 014	1 015	1 016	1 016	1 015	1 018	1 020	1 016	1 017	1 017,7	1 015	1 015,7	1 018	1 016,6
Wind (direction-m/s)	N 3,3	N 3,3	N 3,4	N 3,5	N 3,3	N 3,2	N 3,1	N 3,0	N 3,1	N 3,1	N 3,4	N 3,3	3.3	3.4	3.1	3.2	3.3

== History ==
=== The Middle Ages ===
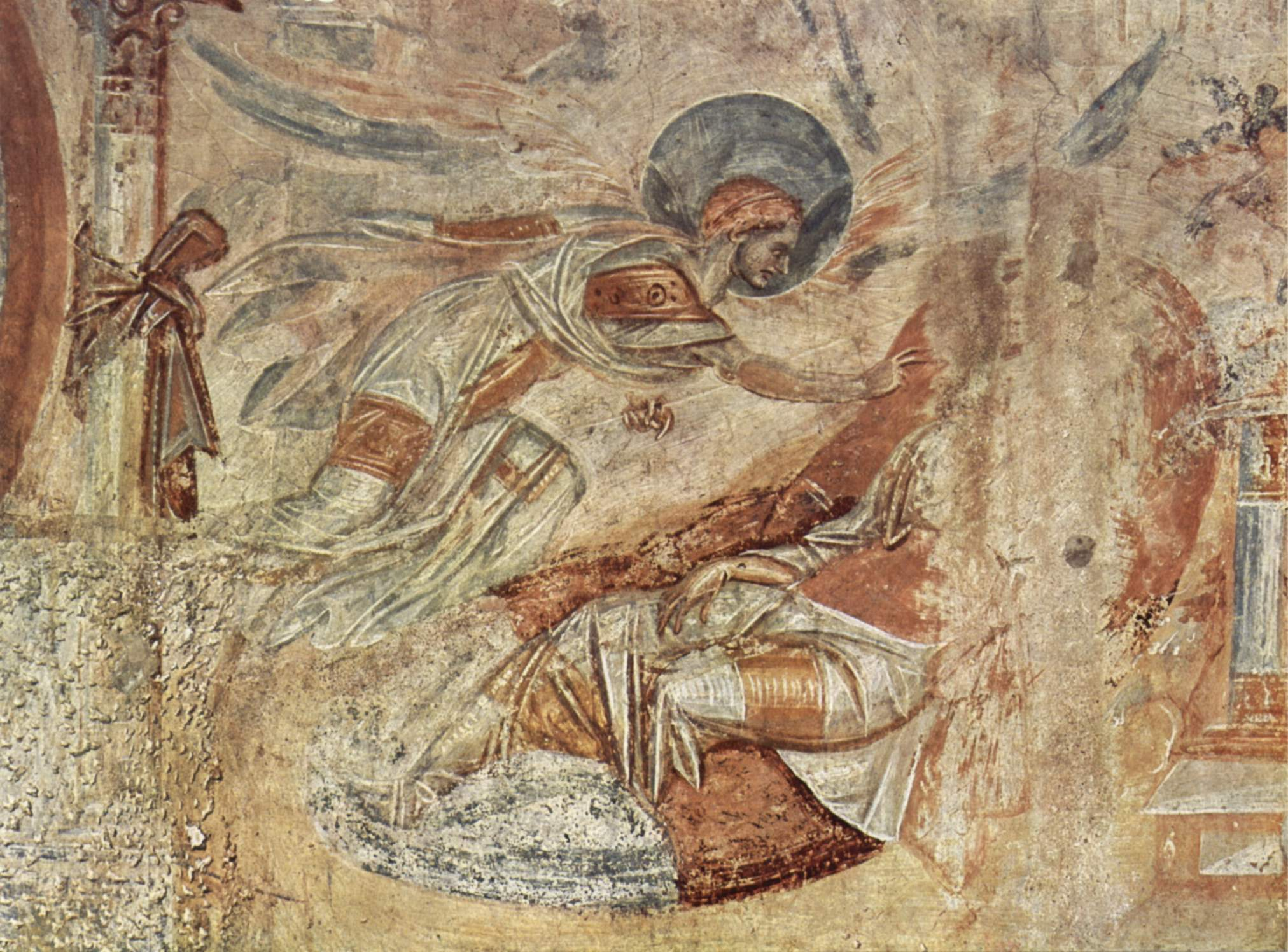
Sogno di San Giuseppe, one of the affreschi di Castelseprio frescoes

Since the Valle Olona ends at Castellanza, the nearby Legnano, just south along the Olona, was strategically chosen by the Lombard League to position the Carroccio—a symbol of municipal autonomy—during Frederick Barbarossa’s fifth and final Italian campaign. This conflict with the medieval communes of Northern Italy culminated in the communal victory at the Battle of Legnano on May 29, 1176, followed by the Peace of Constance on June 25, 1183. The latter agreement saw the Emperor recognize the Lombard League, granting administrative, political, and judicial concessions to the communes, effectively ending his bid to dominate Northern Italy.

At that time, the borough of Legnano offered easy access from the north to the Milanese countryside, positioned at the Valle Olona's outlet. This gateway required staunch defense against military incursions targeting Milan, facilitated by an ancient Roman road, the via Severiana Augusta, linking Mediolanum (modern Milan) to Verbanus Lacus (Lake Maggiore) and onward to the Simplon Pass (Latin: Summo Plano).

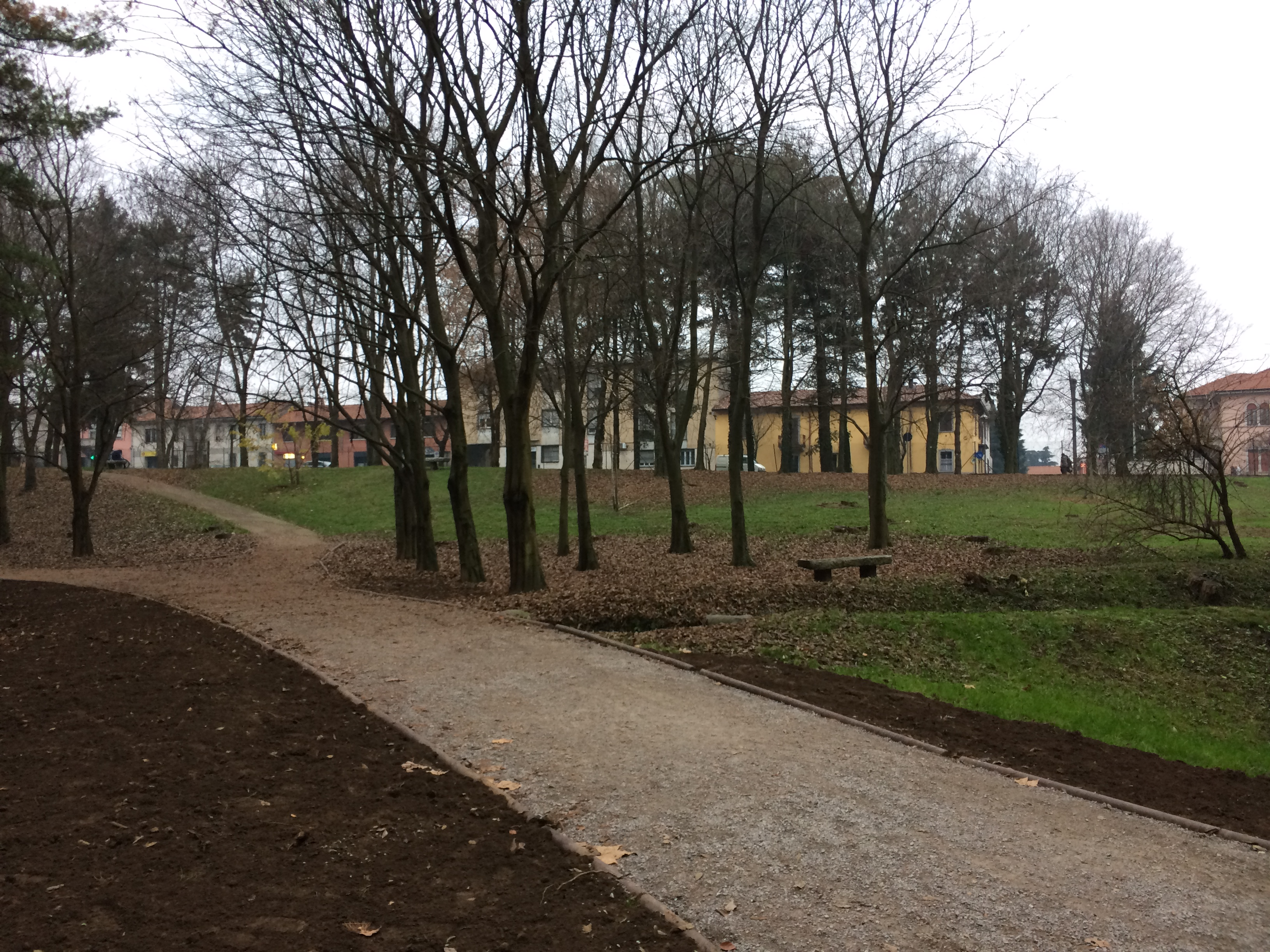
A view of the Castello Park in Legnano. The Costa San Giorgio neighborhood is in the background, with a scarp in the foreground possibly linked to the Battle of Legnano.

The Valle Olona was also the heart of the Contado del Seprio, with ruins of its capital preserved in Castelseprio. In 1287, the entire Seprio was annexed to the Lordship of Milan, which became the Duchy of Milan in 1395. The Valle Olona and Seprio remained under Milanese rule until the Napoleonic era, when they were incorporated into successive Napoleonic puppet states extending beyond modern Lombardy. After Napoleon's defeat at the Battle of Waterloo, they joined the Kingdom of Lombardy–Venetia, a dependency of the Austrian Empire.

Since the Middle Ages, this Lombard region was heavily exploited due to the Olona and its tributaries, enabling the construction of numerous mills. These harnessed water power for grinding grain, forging metal, pressing oil, and sawing timber from local resources like wood, wheat, and oilseeds such as rapeseed and colza. By 1610, the Consorzio del fiume Olona was established to regulate water use, overseeing 116 Olona mills—equipped with 463 waterwheels—spanning the river's course to Rho.

=== The 19th Century and Industrialization ===
Between 1826 and 1828, during the neoclassical reconstruction of Milan's Spanish-era Porta Comasina (renamed Porta Garibaldi in 1860), four colossal statues by Giambattista Perabò were added atop the gate. These allegorically represent Lombardy's major rivers: Po, Adda, Ticino, and Olona.

By the mid-19th century, amid early industrial development, the Valle Olona's economic exploitation evolved. Mills were replaced or supplemented by modern industrial complexes, including cotton mills (e.g., Cantoni Cotton Mill in Legnano, Ponti Cotton Mill in Solbiate Olona, and Candiani Cotton Mill in Fagnano Olona), tanneries (Conceria Fraschini in Varese), paper mills (Vita-Mayer in Cairate and Molina in Varese and Malnate), brick and lime kilns, and spinning or dyeing plants. These used advanced waterwheels, far more efficient than traditional mill wheels.

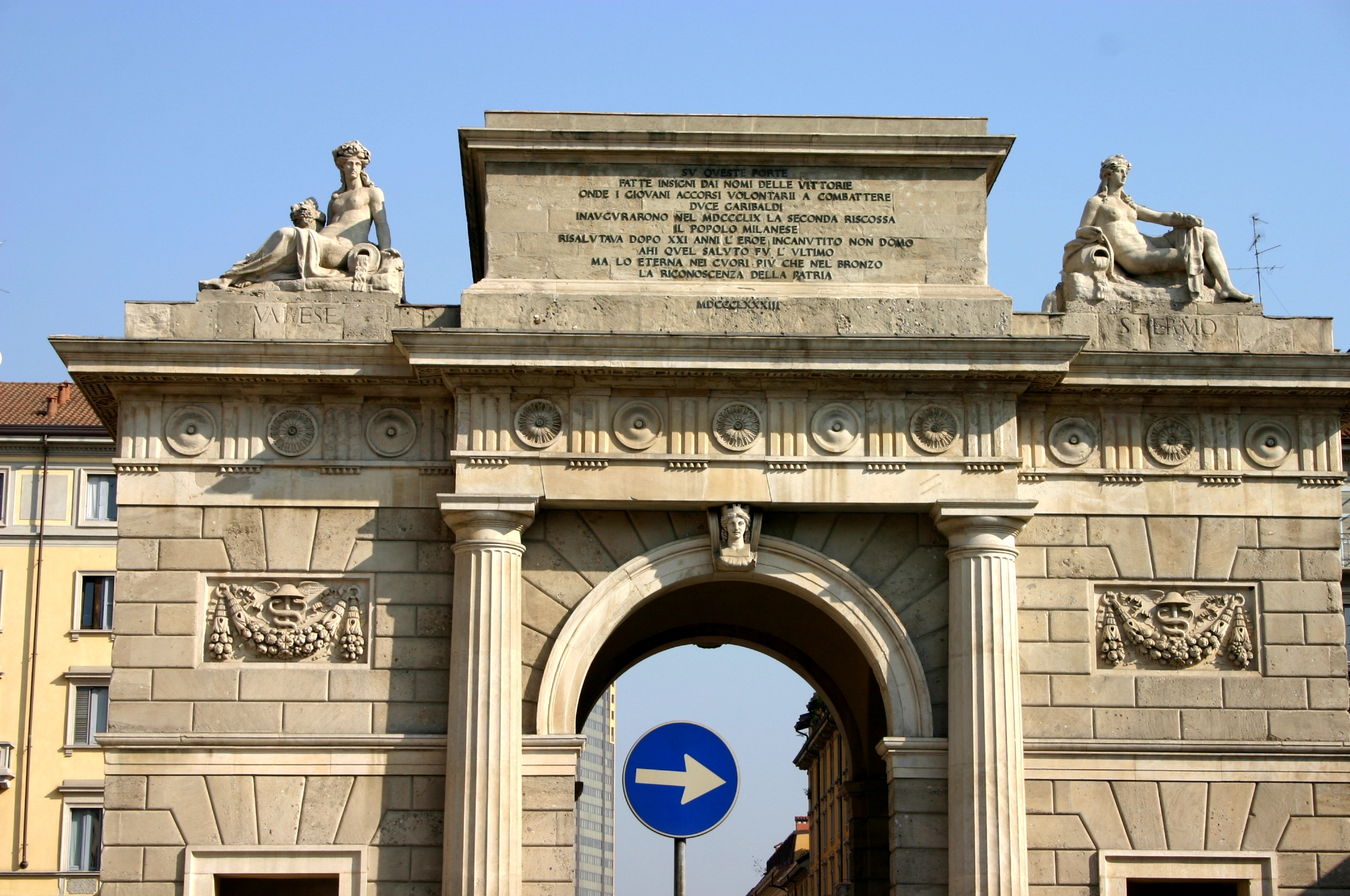
Two of the four statues atop Porta Garibaldi in Milan, allegorically depicting Lombardy's major rivers: the Olona (left) and the Adda (right). The Po and Ticino adorn the opposite side.

The valley and its Olona conurbation became one of Italy's leading industrial zones. Intensive water use—for power and processing—severely polluted the Olona, earning it the title of Italy's most polluted river. This dubious distinction was rivaled only by rivers like the Lambro, Seveso, Lura, Mella, and Arno, which also traverse Lombardy's industrial heartlands.

Following the industrial boom of the 1970s and subsequent economic crises—exacerbated by frequent flooding that crippled local industries—the Olona's water quality has steadily improved. Enhanced by treatment plants, it now rates as "sufficient" or better between Varese and Castellanza.

== Protected Areas ==
=== Parco Valle del Lanza ===
The Parco Valle del Lanza is a locally protected area near the Switzerland border, spanning the provinces of Varese and Como. It occupies the western foothill arc of Lombardy, between the Adda and Ticino rivers, centered on the valley of the Lanza stream (also called Gaggiolo or Ranza). Rising on the southern slopes of Monte San Giorgio in Canton Ticino, the Lanza joins the Olona in Malnate.

=== Parco Rile Tenore Olona ===
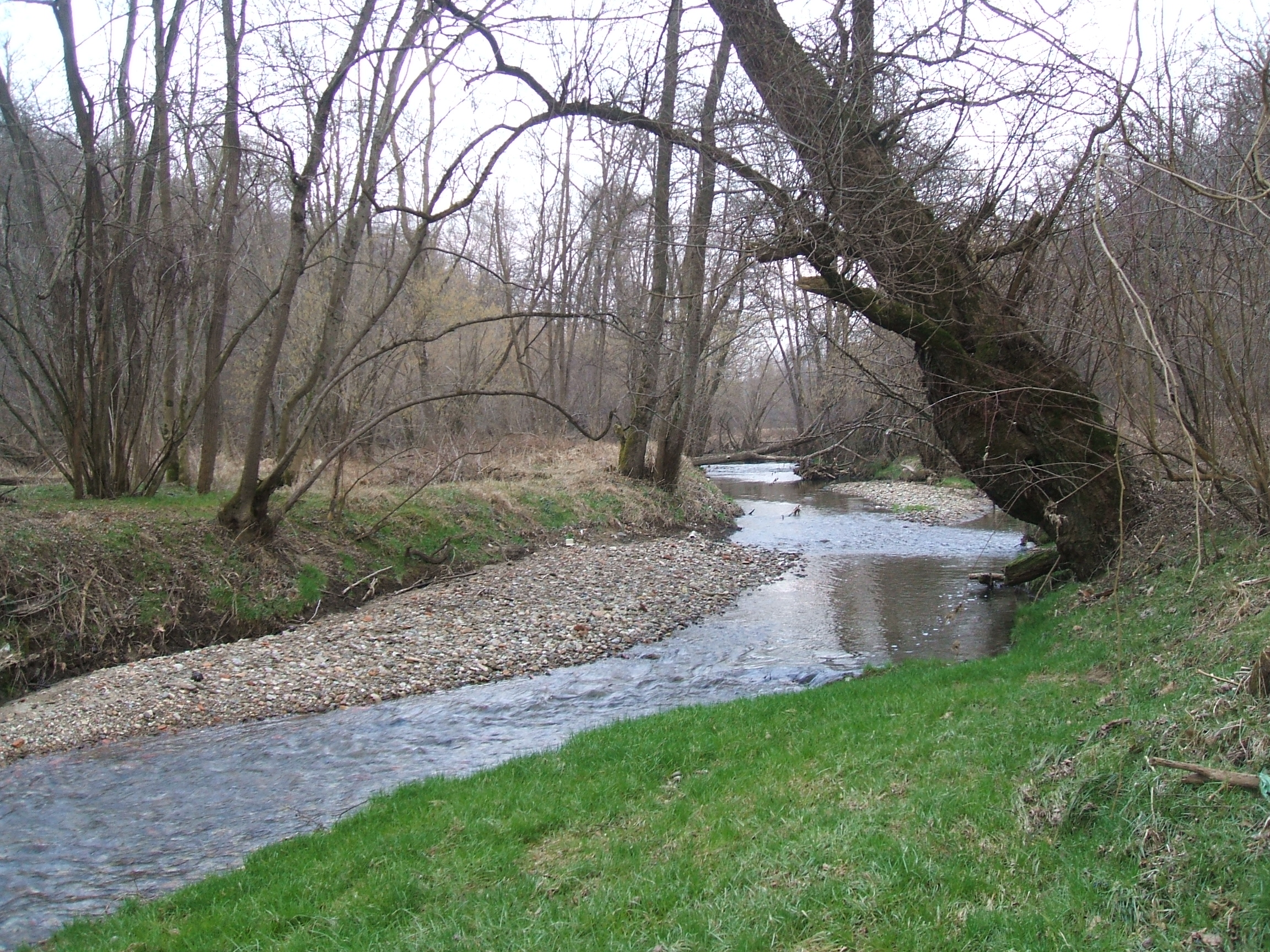
The Lanza stream, merging with the Olona at Malnate.

The Parco Rile Tenore Olona (commonly "RTO") safeguards the valley across Lozza, Castiglione Olona, Gornate Olona, Castelseprio, and Lonate Ceppino. It also covers the western morainic plateau, including Gazzada Schianno, Morazzone, Caronno Varesino, and Carnago, where the Rile and Tenore streams flow. Established in 2006 at Castiglione Olona’s initiative, the park is headquartered there.

=== Parco del Medio Olona ===
The Parco del Medio Olona protects the valley in Fagnano Olona, Gorla Maggiore, Solbiate Olona, Gorla Minore, Olgiate Olona, and Marnate, encompassing the Tenore stream area in Fagnano Olona and eastern woodlands in Gorla Maggiore, home to the Fontanile di Tradate. Founded in 2006, it is based in Fagnano Olona.

=== Parco del Bosco del Rugareto ===
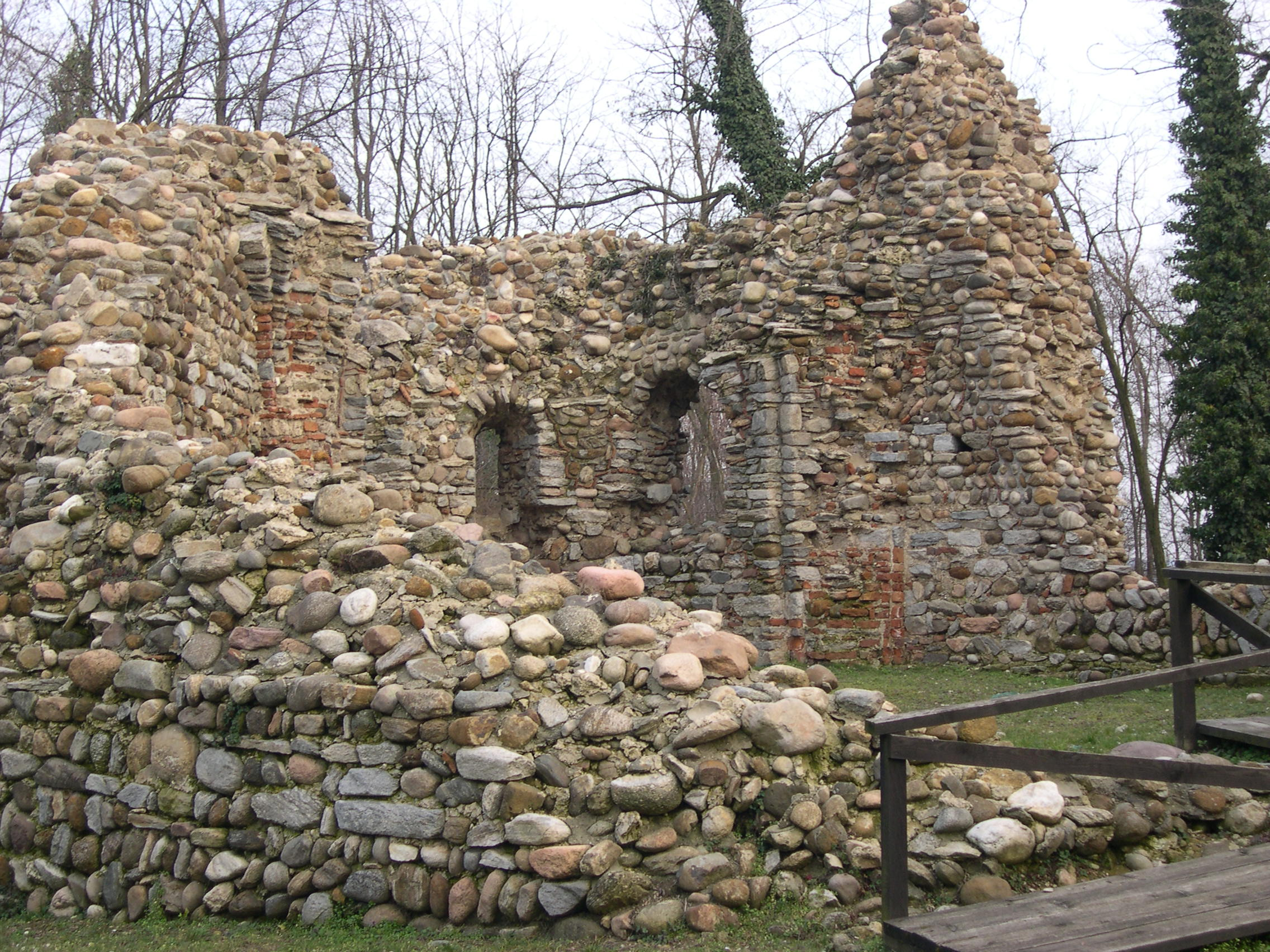
Ruins of San Paolo church in the Parco archeologico di Castelseprio.

The Parco del bosco del Rugareto, a locally protected area, extends east of the Valle Olona to the Tradate pine forest. Covering about 1,400 hectares, it spans Cislago, Marnate, Gorla Minore in Province of Varese, and Rescaldina in Province of Milan. Its woodlands host three streams: the Fontanile di Tradate, Gradeluso (or Bozzentino), and Bozzente, with the latter maintaining steady flow even in dry periods.

=== Parco Archeologico di Castelseprio ===
The Parco archeologico di Castelseprio preserves significant archaeological finds from prehistoric times through the Middle Ages to the Early Modern period. It includes ruins of the fortified settlement and borough of Castelseprio, plus the nearby Chiesa di Santa Maria foris portas. The nearby Torba monastery, managed by the FAI, forms part of this archaeological complex.

Designated a UNESCO World Heritage Site on June 26, 2011, the park emerged after historian Gian Piero Bognetti rediscovered the site in the 1950s.

== Nature ==
=== Flora ===
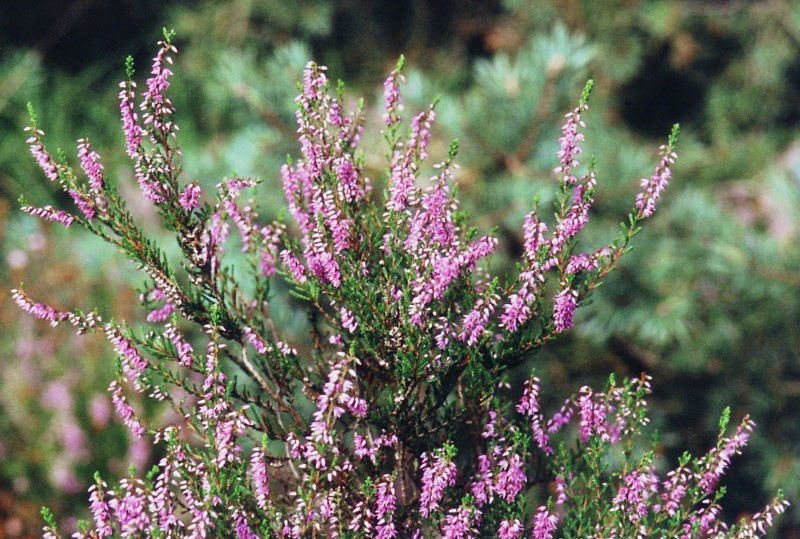
Blooming heather

The Valle Olona's slopes are largely cloaked in woodlands. On the valley floor, small groves alternate with cultivated fields, heathlands, meadows, and disused industrial sites where climbers and shrubs have proliferated since operations ceased.

Among the valley's broadleaf trees are widespread poplars, English oaks, hornbeams, chestnuts, black locusts, red oaks, black alders, willows, ashes, wild cherries, and field elms.

Shrubs include brambles, hazel, hawthorns, cornels, hops, and elderberries. Wildflowers feature snowdrops, spring snowflakes, dog's-tooth violets, lilies of the valley, primroses, cyclamens, nettles, and buttercups. Conifers, less common, include the native Scots pine and the introduced Norway spruce. Northern valley areas host reed beds, while ferns thrive across all wetlands.

The valley also witnesses the gradual expansion of woodlands over former heathlands, dominated by heather—a small shrub with distinctive autumn blooms once harvested for animal bedding. These dry expanses were prone to fires, but reduced cutting and fewer blazes have allowed taller trees and sparse forests to emerge.

=== Fauna ===
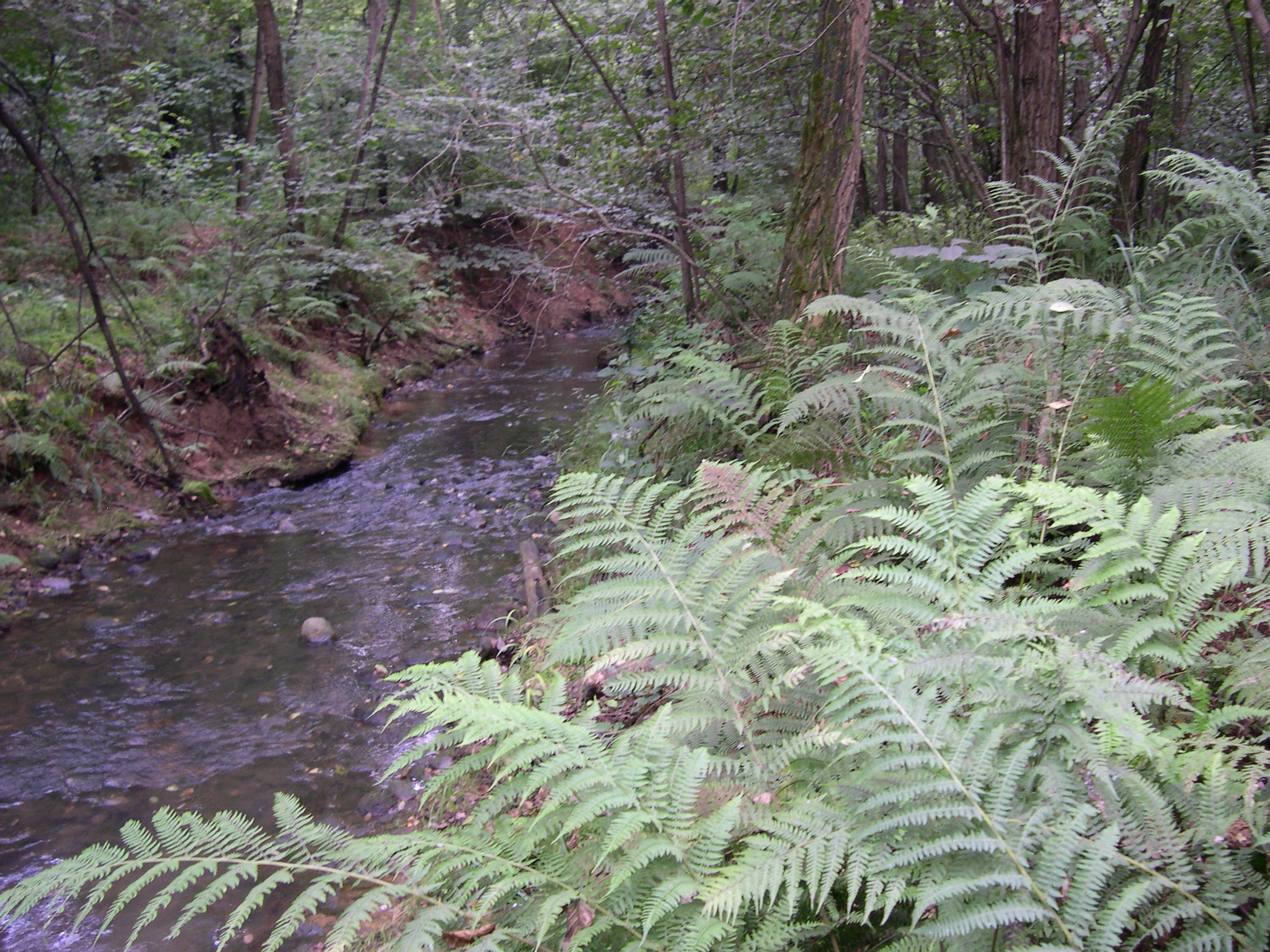
The Rile stream between Cassano Magnago, Bolladello, and Santo Stefano.

In this riverine ecosystem, fish are prominent. Two centuries ago, the Olona teemed with fish, but pollution drastically reduced their numbers, wiping them out in some stretches. Post-2000, factory closures and purification efforts have revitalized the waters, reintroducing fish. Common small species include bleak, rudd, and goldfish, alongside medium-sized chub. Rarer but present are barbel, rainbow trout, and perch in pools near Castiglione Olona.

Among waterfowl, mallards abound, while shy moorhens and coots are common yet elusive. Rarer sightings include the grey heron, little egret, and night heron. Woodland birds feature numerous passerines like house sparrows, blackbirds, redwings, red-rumped swallows, robins, chaffinches, greenfinches, serins, carrion crows, magpies, redstarts, nightingales, crows, and goldfinches. Pigeons include turtle doves and rock doves, while hoopoes feature the hoopoe. Rarer are woodpeckers like the great spotted woodpecker and green woodpecker, and raptors such as the tawny owl, long-eared owl, little owl, kestrel, and buzzard.

Amphibians include the green toad, common toad, agile frog, edible frog, tree frog, and the scarce Italian agile frog. Tailed amphibians feature great crested newts and alpine newts. Mammals typical of broadleaf forests include the red fox, red squirrel, edible dormouse, badger, weasel, stone marten, hedgehog, and various wood mice. Most snakes are harmless—water snakes, whip snakes, and Aesculapian snakes—but the asp viper, the valley's sole venomous snake, is present. Lizards include common Italian wall lizards, green lizards, and slowworms.

== Human geography ==
=== Municipalities of the Valle Olona ===
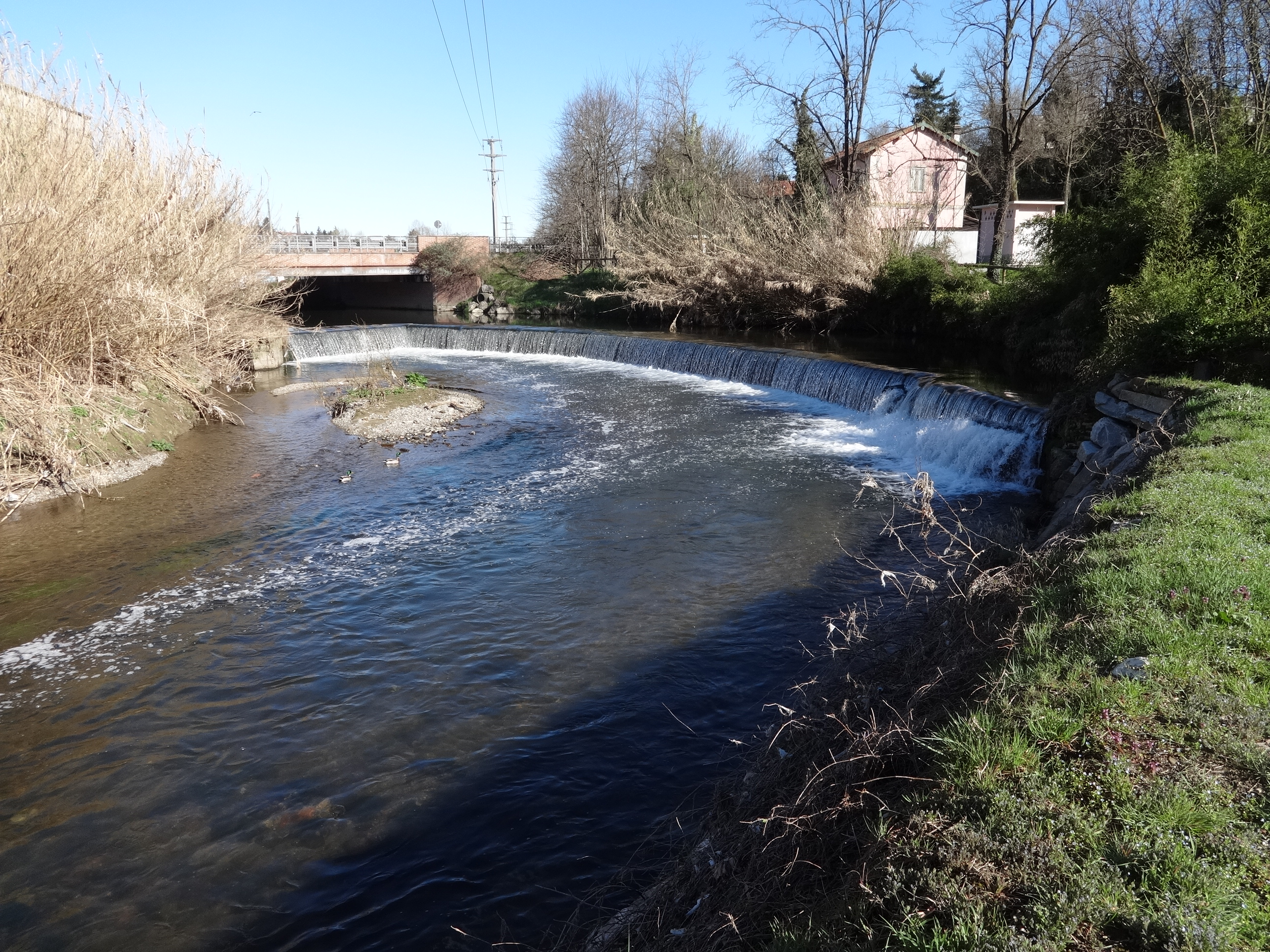
The Olona at Marnate.

- Varese
- Induno Olona
- Malnate
- Vedano Olona
- Lozza
- Castiglione Olona
- Lonate Ceppino
- Gornate Olona
- Castelseprio
- Cairate
- Solbiate Olona
- Fagnano Olona
- Gorla Maggiore
- Gorla Minore
- Olgiate Olona
- Marnate
- Castellanza

=== Industrial archaeology ===
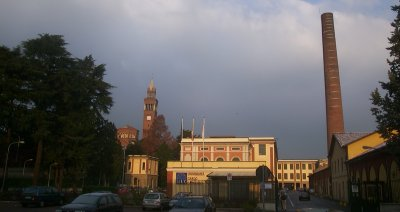
The Università Carlo Cattaneo, housed in the former Cotonificio Cantoni buildings in Castellanza.

Many mills and factories along the river, progressively shuttered since the late 20th century, now lie abandoned and decayed. However, some have been repurposed, such as the Cantoni Cotton Mill in Castellanza, transformed in 1991 into the Università Carlo Cattaneo campus.

=== The Valmorea railway ===
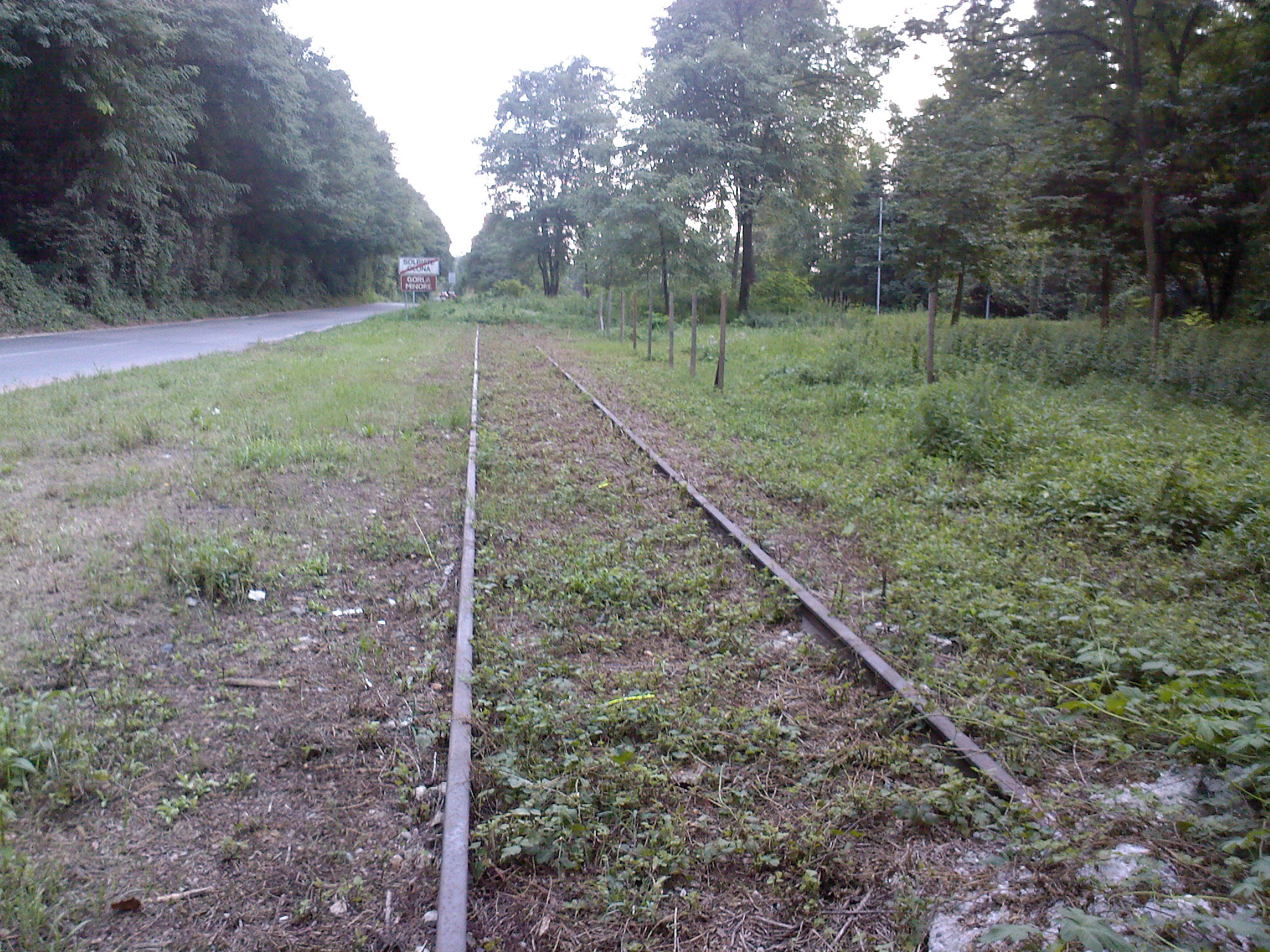
The Valmorea railway track near Solbiate Olona.

Amid the valley's early 20th century industrialization, the Valmorea railway was built to transport raw materials and finished goods to and from local industries while easing workers’ commutes. Opened in 1904, it initially linked Castellanza to Cairate. A second segment extended it to Valmorea in 1916, and by 1926, it reached Mendrisio, serving as a conduit between the Alto Milanese and Switzerland.

In 1928 a Fascist decree closed the Italo-Swiss border at Stabio, restricting the line to Valmorea and initiating its decline. In Switzerland, it persisted as a freight spur. Stripped of its international role, passenger service retreated to Cairate by 1938, with goods reaching Malnate. The next year, 1939, the passenger terminus shifted to Castiglione Olona, and public transport ceased in 1952.

Freight traffic ended on July 16, 1977, following the closure of Cartiera Vita Mayer in Cairate—the line's primary client—and waning interest from other valley firms. Since 1995, a historical-touristic revival has restored the northern segment, enabling travel from Mendrisio to Malnate Olona since 2007. Plans aim to extend this to Castiglione Olona, while the Castellanza-to-Castiglione stretch became a cycle path in 2010.

== See also ==
- Olona
- Province of Varese
- Olona River Consortium

== Bibliography ==
- Autori vari (2015). Il Palio di Legnano : Sagra del Carroccio e Palio delle Contrade nella storia e nella vita della città [The Palio of Legnano : Sagra del Carroccio and Palio delle Contrade in the history and life of the city] (in Italian). Banca di Legnano.
- D'Ilario, Giorgio; Gianazza, Egidio; Marinoni, Augusto (1976). Legnano e la battaglia [Legnano and the battle] (in Italian). Edizioni Landoni.
- Macchione, Pietro; Gavinelli, Mauro (1998). Olona. Il fiume, la civiltà, il lavoro [Olona. The river, civilization, work.] (in Italian). Varese: Macchione Editore.
- Marinoni, Augusto (1992). "La battaglia di Legnano è avvenuta nel territorio sangiorgese?" [Did the Battle of Legnano take place in Sangiorgese territory?]. In Agnoletto, Attilio (ed.). San Giorgio su Legnano – storia, società, ambiente [San Giorgio su Legnano – history, society, environment] (in Italian). Edizioni Landoni.
