= Autostrada A60 =

Controlled-access highway in Italy

Autostrada A60
- Tangenziale di Varese; Varese ring road

Route information
- Maintained by Autostrada Pedemontana Lombarda S.p.A
- Length: 4.8 km (3.0 mi)
- Existed: 2015–present

Major junctions
- Beltway around Varese
- North end: Gazzada Schianno
- A8 in Gazzada Schianno
- South end: Vedano Olona

Location
- Country: Italy
- Regions: Lombardy

Highway system
- Roads in Italy; Autostrade; State; Regional; Provincial; Municipal
← A 59	→ A 90

Autostrada A60 or Tangenziale di Varese ("Varese ring road") is an autostrada (Italian for "motorway") 4.8 kilometres (3.0 mi) long in Italy located in the region of Lombardy and tangent to the suburban area of Varese in the south. It is managed by Autostrada Pedemontana Lombarda S.p.A.

== Route ==
TANGENZIALE DI VARESE; Autostrada A60
Exit	↓km↓	↑km↑	Province	European Route
Milano-Varese; Raccordo Gazzada-Varese	0.0 km (0 mi)	4.8 km (3.0 mi)	VA	--
Gazzada- Morazzone (Note: Northbound exit and southbound entrance) de La Selvagna - Gazzada per la Pianura Padana - Morazzone	0.4 km (0.25 mi)	4.4 km (2.7 mi)	VA	--
Vedano Olona; Varesina della Elvetia - Gurone di Malnate de La Selvagna - Lozza; Varese Bizzozero - Varese; Ospedale di Circolo e Fondazione Macchi; University of Insubria	4.4 km (2.7 mi)	0.4 km (0.25 mi)	VA	--
Tangenziale Est di Varese	4.8 km (3.0 mi)	0.0 km (0 mi)	VA	--

== See also ==
- Autostrade of Italy
- Roads in Italy
- Transport in Italy

=== Other Italian roads ===
- State highways (Italy)
- Regional road (Italy)
- Provincial road (Italy)
- Municipal road (Italy)
