= Milanello =

Training facility of Italian football club A.C. Milan

- Centro Sportivo Milanello
- Interactive map of Milanello
- Full name: Milanello Sports Center
- Location: Carnago, Italy
- Coordinates: 45.706974°N 8.833394°E
- Owner: A.C. Milan
- Type: Football training facility
- Surface: Grass (six regulation-size pitches); Synthetic turf (two reduced-size pitches)

Construction
- Opened: 1963

Website
- www.acmilan.com/en/club/venues/milanello

Milanello Sports Center (Italian: Centro Sportivo Milanello), commonly referred to as simply Milanello, is the training facility of Italian football club A.C. Milan. Built in 1963, the centre consists of 160,000 square metres (1,700,000 sq ft). It is located between the towns of Carnago, Cassano Magnago and Cairate, in the province of Varese, about 40 km northwest of Milan.

Milanello currently represents an important asset not only for the club, but for the whole Italian football system. This was the objective pursued by Andrea Rizzoli who decided to build it. The facilities of Milanello have often been used also by the Italian Football Federation for the preparation of the National Team’s important competitions, such as the European Championships in 1988, 1996 and 2000.

At Milanello there are six regular pitches, 1 in synthetic grass (35 m x 30), 1 covered pitch with synthetic ground (42 m x 24) and a small-sized outdoor pitch in grass named "cage" because the playing field is surrounded by a 2,30 m high wall and topped by 2,5 m high fencing. Inside the cage, the play never stops, with the ball always in motion in order to enhance the speed of execution. A path running through the woods ca. 1,200 m long at various altitudes is used during the season for the players’ physical training (running and biking) and for the recovery of injured players. The main building of the centre is a two-floor building (plus the basement) hosting the offices, the players’ rooms, the chimney room, a TV-room, a pool-room; a bar, a kitchen, two dining-rooms, the press room, the meeting room, the laundry, the ironing-room and the medical centre. Next to the main building the "guest-quarters" are located, where a few players from the Youth Department also live. These youngsters, coming from various parts of Italy and from abroad too, go to school as all other teenagers and in the afternoons attend their training sessions on the field made available to them.
