= Castelseprio =

Castelseprio may refer to:

- Castelseprio (archaeological park) near the village, the site of a Roman fort in antiquity, and a significant Lombard town in the early Middle Ages with famous frescos
- Castelseprio (comune), comune (municipality, here a village) in the Province of Varese in the Italian region Lombardy
