= Locate Varesino =

- Comune
- Comune di Locate Varesino
- Location within Italy Location within Lombardy
- Coordinates: 45°41′N 8°56′E
- Country: Italy
- Region: Lombardy
- Province: Province of Como (CO)

Area
  - Total: 5.8 km^{2} (2.2 sq mi)

Population (Dec. 2015)
  - Total: 4,349
  - Density: 750/km^{2} (1,900/sq mi)
- Demonym: Locatesi
- Time zone: UTC+1 (CET)
  - Summer (DST): UTC+2 (CEST)
- Postal code: 22070
- Dialing code: 0331
- Website: Official website

Locate Varesino (Comasco: Locàa [luˈkaː]) is a comune (municipality) in the Province of Como in the Italian region Lombardy, located about 30 kilometres (19 mi) northwest of Milan and about 20 kilometres (12 mi) southwest of Como. As of 31 December 2015, it had a population of 4,349 and an area of 5.8 km^{2} (2.2 sq mi).

Locate Varesino borders the following municipalities: Cairate, Carbonate, Fagnano Olona, Gorla Maggiore, Tradate.

== Demographic evolution ==
Historical population

Year	Pop.	±%
1861	1,301	—
1871	1,453	+11.7%
1881	1,494	+2.8%
1901	1,299	−13.1%
1911	1,472	+13.3%

Year	Pop.	±%
1921	1,625	+10.4%
1931	1,782	+9.7%
1936	1,704	−4.4%
1951	2,142	+25.7%
1961	2,654	+23.9%

Year	Pop.	±%
1971	3,172	+19.5%
1981	3,215	+1.4%
1991	3,685	+14.6%
2001	3,960	+7.5%

Source: Data from ISTAT
