= Lonate =

Lonate may refer to the following places in Province of Varese, Italy:

- Lonate Ceppino
- Lonate Pozzolo
