= Brunello, Lombardy =

Brunello
- Comune
- Comune di Brunello
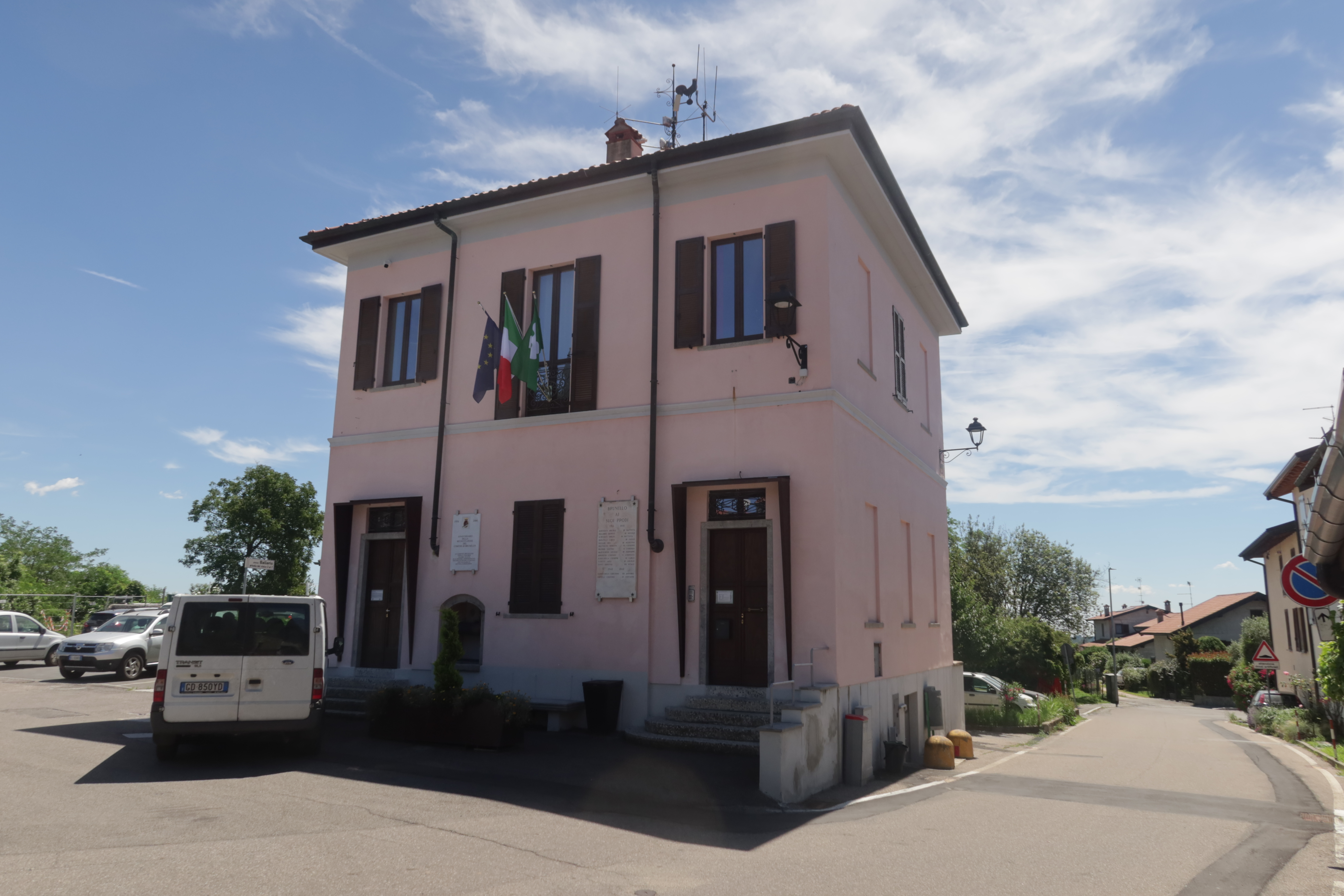
- City Hall of Brunello

- Location within Italy Location within Lombardy
- Coordinates: 45°45′N 8°47′E
- Country: Italy
- Region: Lombardy
- Province: Province of Varese (VA)
- Frazioni: Collodri, Rosea

Area
  - Total: 1.6 km^{2} (0.62 sq mi)
- Highest elevation: 423 m (1,388 ft)
- Lowest elevation: 337 m (1,106 ft)

Population (Dec. 2004)
  - Total: 1,006
  - Density: 630/km^{2} (1,600/sq mi)
- Demonym: Brunellesi
- Time zone: UTC+1 (CET)
  - Summer (DST): UTC+2 (CEST)
- Postal code: 21022
- Dialing code: 0332
- Website: Official website

Brunello is a comune (municipality) in the Province of Varese in the Italian region Lombardy, located about 45 kilometres (28 mi) northwest of Milan and about 6 kilometres (4 mi) southwest of Varese. As of 31 December 2004, it had a population of 1,006 and an area of 1.6 square kilometres (0.62 mi^{2}).

The municipality of Brunello contains the frazioni (subdivisions, mainly villages and hamlets) Collodri and Rosea.

Brunello borders the following municipalities: Azzate, Buguggiate, Castronno, Gazzada Schianno, Morazzone, Sumirago.

== Demographic evolution ==
Historical population

Year	Pop.	±%
1861	386	—
1871	370	−4.1%
1881	431	+16.5%
1901	431	+0.0%
1911	476	+10.4%

Year	Pop.	±%
1921	469	−1.5%
1931	349	−25.6%
1936	318	−8.9%
1951	378	+18.9%
1961	427	+13.0%

Year	Pop.	±%
1971	591	+38.4%
1981	735	+24.4%
1991	842	+14.6%
2001	954	+13.3%
2021	600	−37.1%

Source: Data from ISTAT
