= Buguggiate =

- Comune
- Comune di Buguggiate
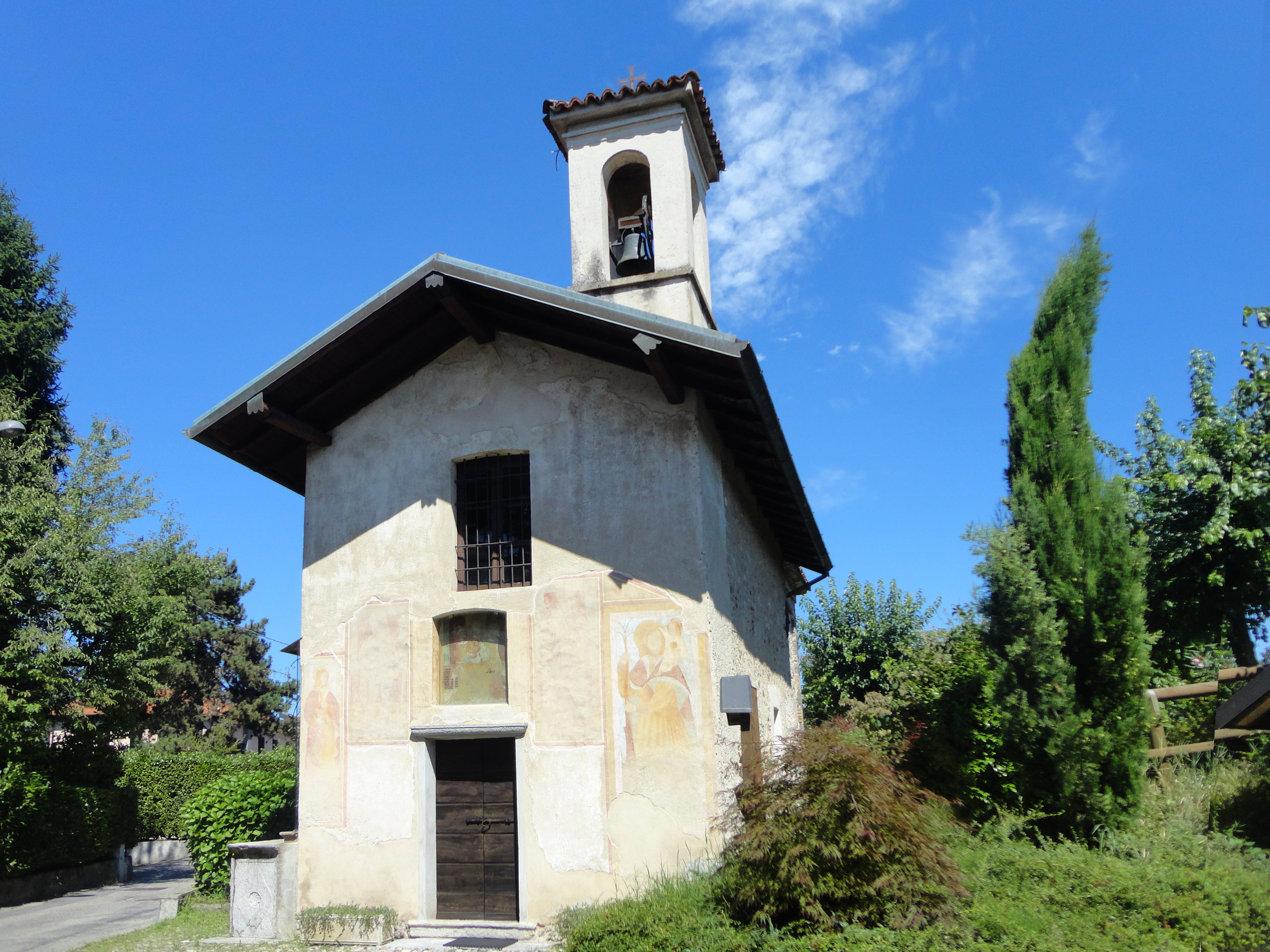
- View of Buguggiate

- Location within Italy Location within Lombardy
- Coordinates: 45°46′N 8°48′E
- Country: Italy
- Region: Lombardy
- Province: Varese (VA)

Government
  - Mayor: Matteo Sambo

Area
  - Total: 2.6 km^{2} (1.0 sq mi)
- Elevation: 306 m (1,004 ft)

Population (31 December 2010)
  - Total: 3,122
  - Density: 1,200/km^{2} (3,100/sq mi)
- Demonym: Buguggiatesi
- Time zone: UTC+1 (CET)
  - Summer (DST): UTC+2 (CEST)
- Postal code: 21020
- Dialing code: 0332
- Website: Official website

Buguggiate is a comune (municipality) in the Province of Varese in the Italian region Lombardy, located about 45 kilometres (28 mi) northwest of Milan and about 6 kilometres (4 mi) southwest of Varese.

Buguggiate borders the following municipalities: Azzate, Brunello, Gazzada Schianno, Varese.
