= Abon Plastic =

Plastic packaging manufacturer in Italy

Abon Plastic SRL is an Italian manufacturer of thermoformed plastic packaging. The company's headquarters are located near Milan, Italy, in Gornate-Olona, Varese.

Abon Plastic's products include blister packs, clamshells, holding and display trays, and stackable takeout pizza trays. Their clients include Sony Corporation, Philips Electronics and L'Oreal Paris. They are involved in specialty packaging for the cosmetic, electronics, and specialty lighting (L.E.D's), as well as the food and beverage industries. They invented and patented a stackable takeout pizza container called Piattopak.
