= Gorla Maggiore =

- Comune
- Comune di Gorla Maggiore
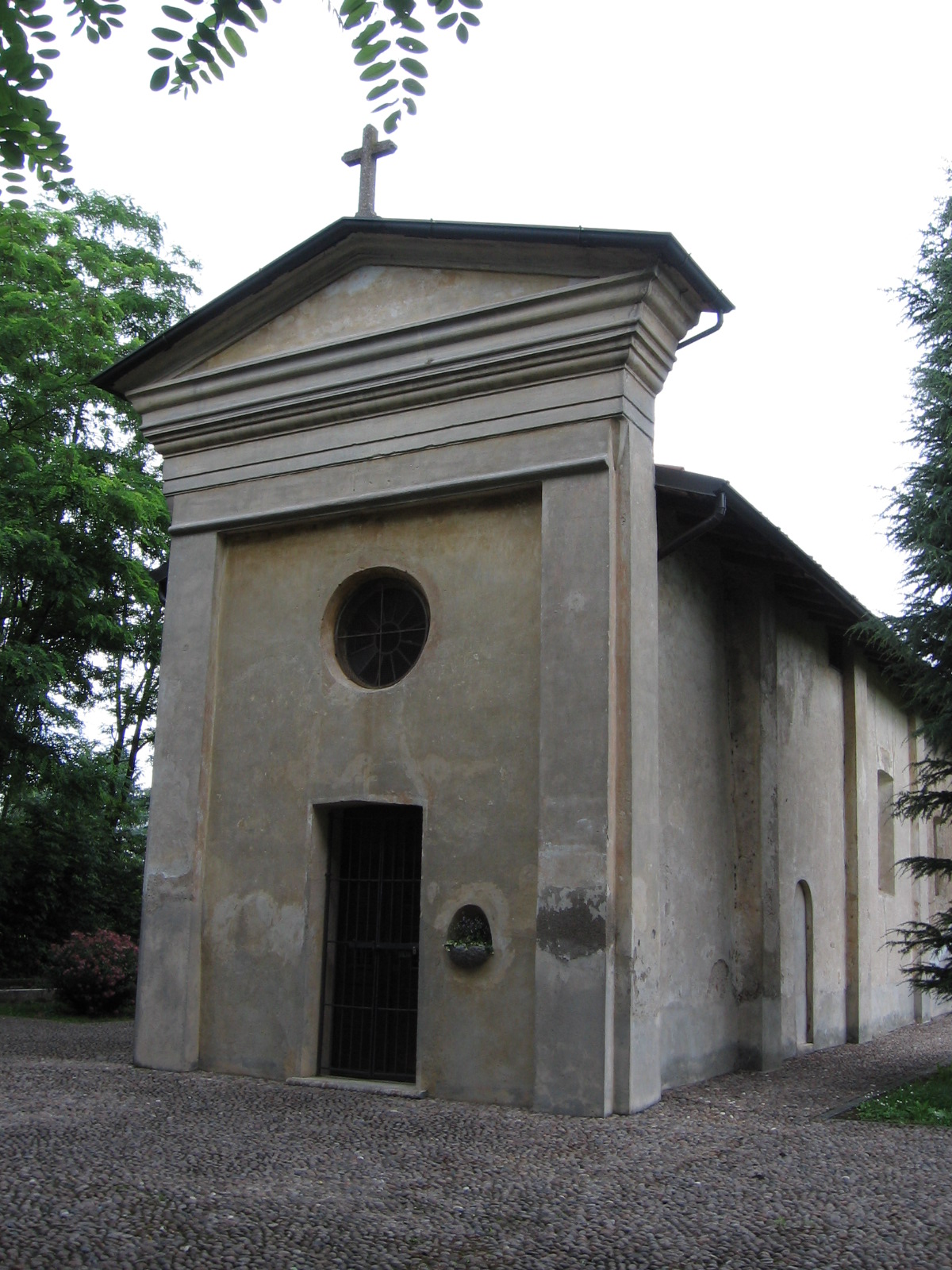

- Location within Italy Location within Lombardy
- Coordinates: 45°40′N 8°53′E
- Country: Italy
- Region: Lombardy
- Province: Province of Varese (VA)

Area
  - Total: 5.16 km^{2} (1.99 sq mi)
- Elevation: 254 m (833 ft)

Population (Dec. 2010)
  - Total: 4,942
  - Density: 958/km^{2} (2,480/sq mi)
- Demonym: Gorlesi
- Time zone: UTC+1 (CET)
  - Summer (DST): UTC+2 (CEST)
- Postal code: 21050
- Dialing code: 0331
- Patron saint: Santa Maria Assunta
- Saint day: 15 of August
- Website: Official website

Gorla Maggiore is a comune (municipality) in the Province of Varese in the Italian region Lombardy, located about 30 kilometres (19 mi) northwest of Milan and about 15 kilometres (9 mi) southeast of Varese. As of 31 December 2004, it has a population of 4,942 and an area of 5.3 square kilometres (2.0 mi^{2}).

Gorla Maggiore borders the following municipalities: Carbonate, Fagnano Olona, Gorla Minore, Locate Varesino, Mozzate, Solbiate Olona.

Since the 1 June 2015 the mayor of the city is Pietro Zappamiglio.

== Population history ==
Historical population

Year	Pop.	±%
1861	1,406	—
1871	1,670	+18.8%
1881	1,601	−4.1%
1901	1,792	+11.9%
1911	2,198	+22.7%

Year	Pop.	±%
1921	2,150	−2.2%
1931	2,242	+4.3%
1936	2,283	+1.8%
1951	2,682	+17.5%
1961	3,171	+18.2%

Year	Pop.	±%
1971	3,424	+8.0%
1981	4,087	+19.4%
1991	4,598	+12.5%
2001	4,836	+5.2%

Source: Data from ISTAT
