= Carbonate, Lombardy =

Carbonate Carbunaa (Lombard)
- Comune
- Comune di Carbonate
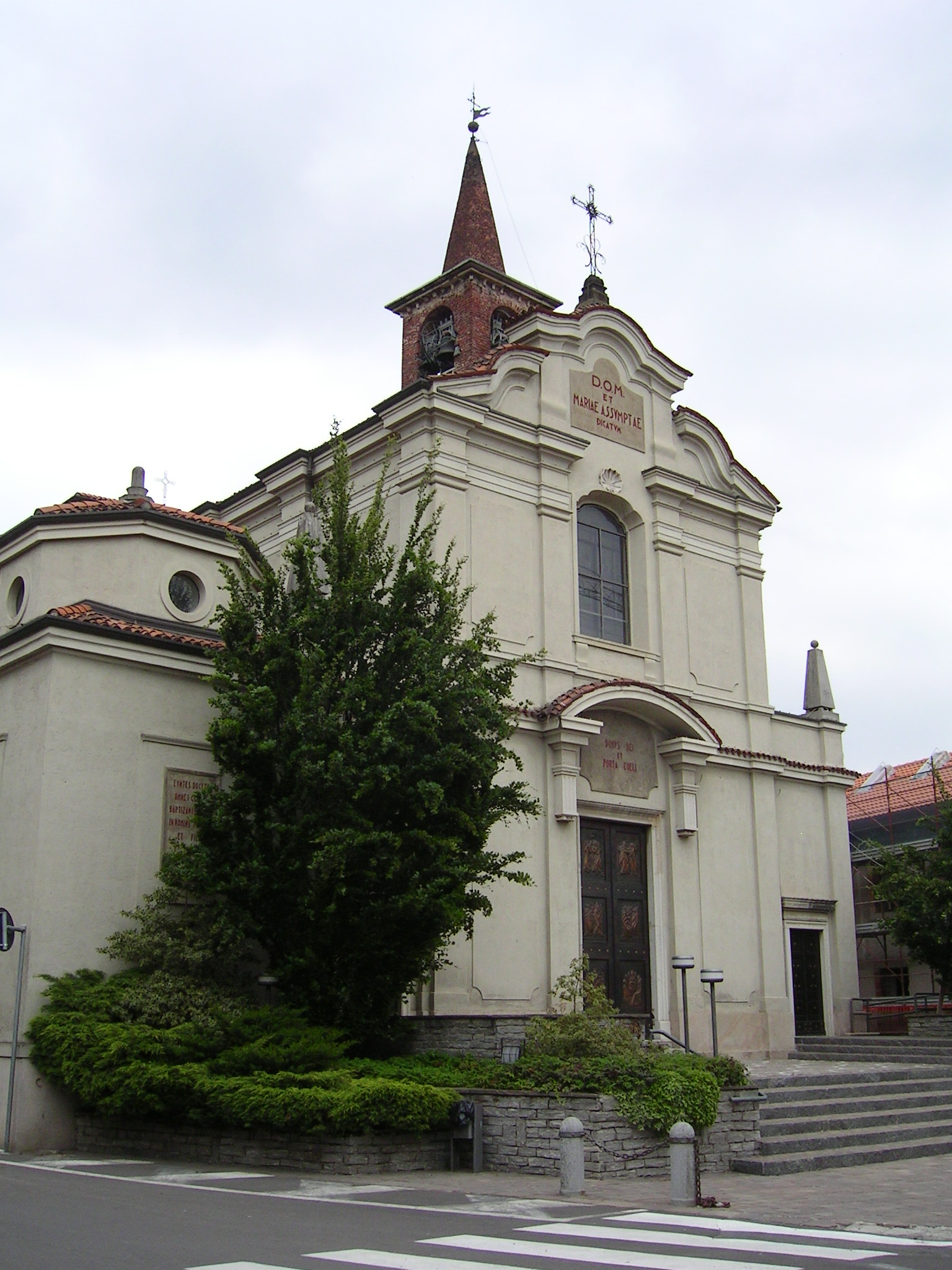
- The Church of Carbonate

- Coat of arms

- Location within Italy Location within Lombardy
- Coordinates: 45°40′N 8°56′E
- Country: Italy
- Region: Lombardy
- Province: Province of Como (CO)
- Frazioni: Cascina Cipollina, Cascina Abbondanza, Moneta, La Pinetina

Government
  - Mayor: Luca Roscelli

Area
  - Total: 5.2 km^{2} (2.0 sq mi)
- Elevation: 267 m (876 ft)

Population (Dec. 2004)
  - Total: 2,757
  - Density: 530/km^{2} (1,400/sq mi)
- Demonym: Carbonatesi
- Time zone: UTC+1 (CET)
  - Summer (DST): UTC+2 (CEST)
- Postal code: 22070
- Dialing code: 0331
- Website: Official website

Carbonate (Comasco: Carbunaa [karbuˈnaː]) is a comune (municipality) in the Province of Como in the Italian region Lombardy, located about 30 kilometres (19 mi) northwest of Milan and about 20 kilometres (12 mi) southwest of Como. As of 31 December 2004, it had a population of 2,757 and an area of 5.2 square kilometres (2.0 mi^{2}).

The municipality of Carbonate contains the frazioni (subdivisions, mainly villages and hamlets) Cascina Cipollina, Cascina Abbondanza, Moneta, and La Pinetina.

Carbonate borders the following municipalities: Appiano Gentile, Gorla Maggiore, Locate Varesino, Lurago Marinone, Mozzate, Tradate.

== Demographic evolution ==
Historical population

Year	Pop.	±%
1861	698	—
1871	657	−5.9%
1881	759	+15.5%
1901	781	+2.9%
1911	888	+13.7%

Year	Pop.	±%
1921	1,001	+12.7%
1931	947	−5.4%
1936	951	+0.4%
1951	1,210	+27.2%
1961	1,344	+11.1%

Year	Pop.	±%
1971	1,662	+23.7%
1981	2,151	+29.4%
1991	2,305	+7.2%
2001	2,575	+11.7%

Source: Data from ISTAT
