= Cairate =

- Comune
- Comune di Cairate
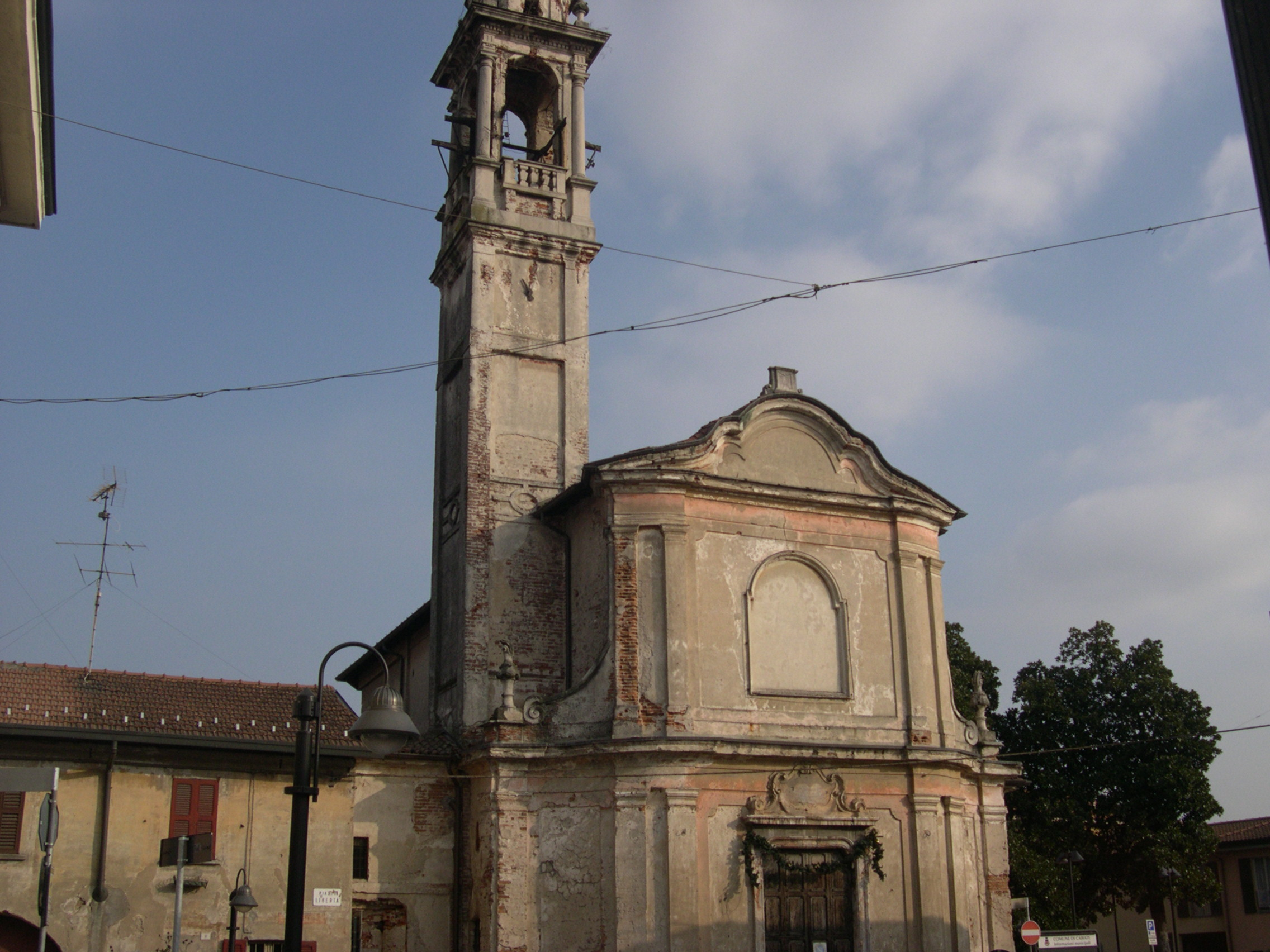

- Coat of arms

- Location within Italy Location within Lombardy
- Coordinates: 45°41′N 8°52′E
- Country: Italy
- Region: Lombardy
- Province: Varese (VA)

Government
  - Mayor: Paolo Mazzucchelli

Area
  - Total: 11.3 km^{2} (4.4 sq mi)

Population (31 December 2010)
  - Total: 7,887
  - Density: 698/km^{2} (1,810/sq mi)
- Demonym: Cairatesi
- Time zone: UTC+1 (CET)
  - Summer (DST): UTC+2 (CEST)
- Postal code: 21050
- Dialing code: 0331
- Patron saint: Our Lady of the Rosary
- Saint day: 7 October
- Website: Official website

Cairate is a comune (municipality) in the Province of Varese in the Italian region Lombardy, located about 35 kilometres (22 mi) northwest of Milan and about 15 kilometres (9 mi) south of Varese.

Cairate borders the following municipalities: Carnago, Cassano Magnago, Castelseprio, Fagnano Olona, Locate Varesino, Lonate Ceppino, Tradate.
