= Carnago =

- Comune
- Comune di Carnago
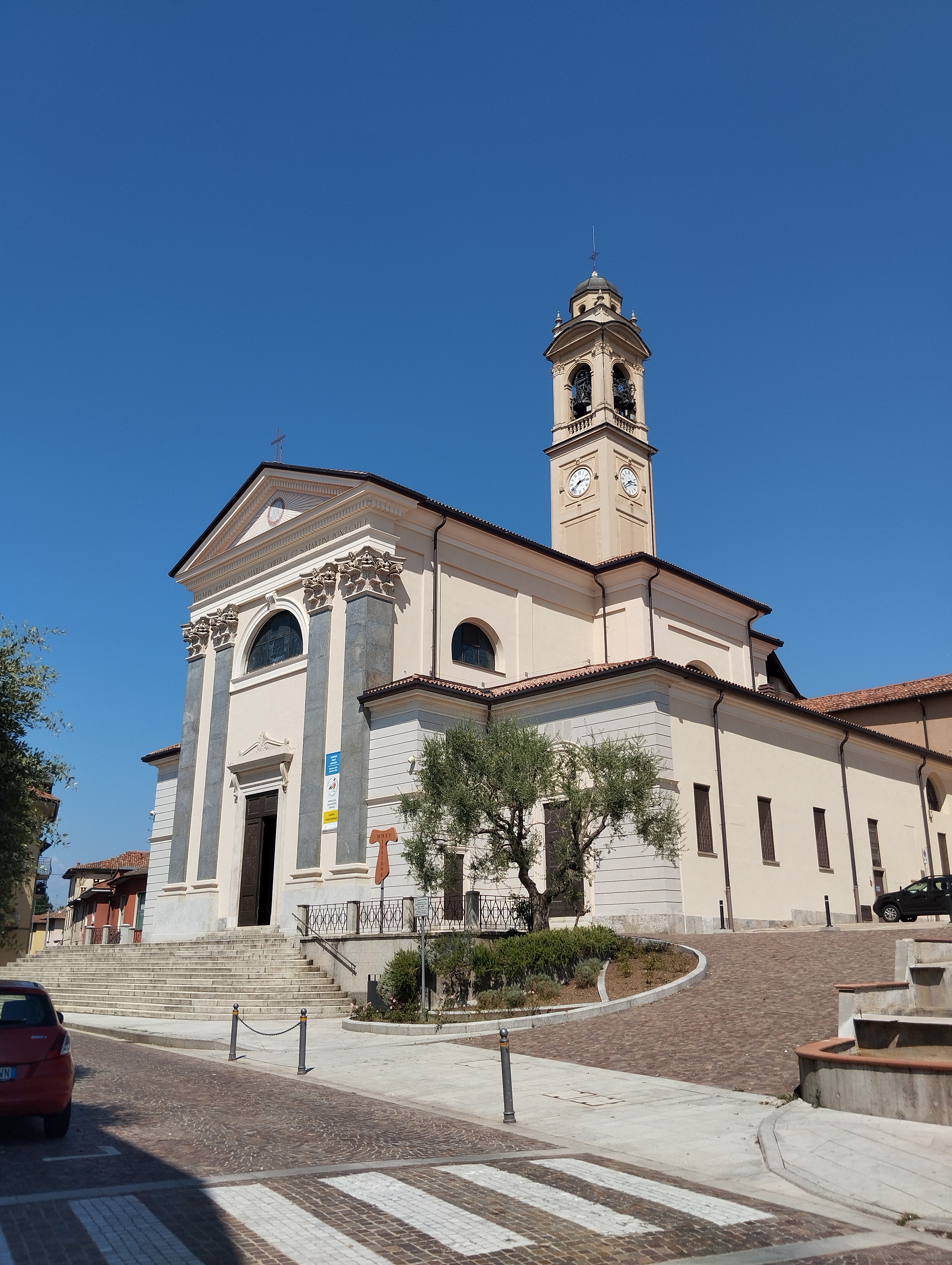
- The Church of San Martino of Carnago

- Location within Italy Location within Lombardy
- Coordinates: 45°43′N 8°50′E
- Country: Italy
- Region: Lombardy
- Province: Province of Varese (VA)
- Frazioni: Rovate

Area
  - Total: 6.2 km^{2} (2.4 sq mi)
- Elevation: 356 m (1,168 ft)

Population (Dec. 2004)
  - Total: 5,831
  - Density: 940/km^{2} (2,400/sq mi)
- Demonym: Carnaghesi
- Time zone: UTC+1 (CET)
  - Summer (DST): UTC+2 (CEST)
- Postal code: 21040
- Dialing code: 0331
- Website: Official website

Carnago is a comune (municipality) in the Province of Varese in the Italian region Lombardy, located about 40 km (25 mi) northwest of Milan and about 11 km (6.8 mi) south of Varese. As of 31 December 2004, it had a population of 5,831 and an area of 6.2 km^{2} (2.4 sq mi).

The municipality of Carnago contains the frazione (subdivision) Rovate. Carnago is also the location of Milanello, the training facility of Serie A giant A.C. Milan.

Carnago borders the following municipalities: Cairate, Caronno Varesino, Cassano Magnago, Castelseprio, Gornate-Olona, Oggiona con Santo Stefano, Solbiate Arno.

== Demographic evolution ==
Historical population

Year	Pop.	±%
1861	1,619	—
1871	1,772	+9.5%
1881	1,898	+7.1%
1901	1,791	−5.6%
1911	2,017	+12.6%

Year	Pop.	±%
1921	2,230	+10.6%
1931	2,220	−0.4%
1936	2,255	+1.6%
1951	2,768	+22.7%
1961	3,642	+31.6%

Year	Pop.	±%
1971	4,564	+25.3%
1981	4,569	+0.1%
1991	4,999	+9.4%
2001	5,639	+12.8%

Source: Data from ISTAT
