= Pianalto =

Pianalto is an Italian surname. Notable people with the surname include:

- Sandra Pianalto (born 1954), Italian–born American economist
- Zack Pianalto (born 1989), American football player
