= Caronno Varesino =

- Comune
- Comune di Caronno Varesino
- Location within Italy Location within Lombardy
- Coordinates: 45°44′N 8°50′E
- Country: Italy
- Region: Lombardy
- Province: Province of Varese (VA)

Government
  - Mayor: Maria Rosa Broggini

Area
  - Total: 5.6 km^{2} (2.2 sq mi)

Population (Dec. 2004)
  - Total: 4,761
  - Density: 850/km^{2} (2,200/sq mi)
- Time zone: UTC+1 (CET)
  - Summer (DST): UTC+2 (CEST)
- Postal code: 21040
- Dialing code: 0331

Caronno Varesino is a comune (municipality) in the Province of Varese in the Italian region Lombardy, located about 40 kilometres (25 mi) northwest of Milan and about 9 kilometres (6 mi) south of Varese. As of 31 December 2004, it had a population of 4,761 and an area of 5.6 square kilometres (2.2 mi^{2}).

Caronno Varesino borders the following municipalities: Albizzate, Carnago, Castiglione Olona, Castronno, Gornate-Olona, Morazzone, Solbiate Arno.

== Demographic evolution ==
Historical population

Year	Pop.	±%
1861	1,673	—
1871	1,724	+3.0%
1881	1,739	+0.9%
1901	1,747	+0.5%
1911	1,806	+3.4%

Year	Pop.	±%
1921	1,773	−1.8%
1931	1,717	−3.2%
1936	1,656	−3.6%
1951	2,325	+40.4%
1961	3,170	+36.3%

Year	Pop.	±%
1971	3,928	+23.9%
1981	4,207	+7.1%
1991	4,419	+5.0%
2001	4,602	+4.1%

Source: Data from ISTAT
