= Lozza, Lombardy =

Lozza
- Comune
- Comune di Lozza
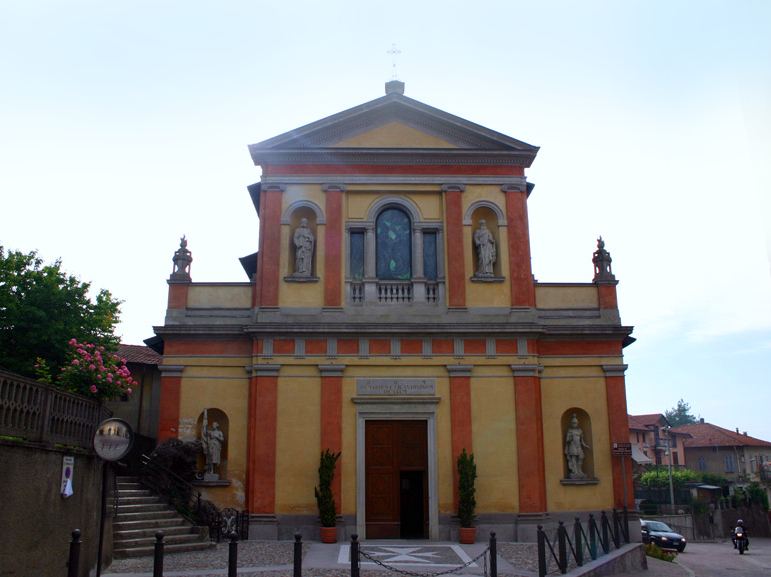

- Location within Italy Location within Lombardy
- Coordinates: 45°47′N 8°51′E
- Country: Italy
- Region: Lombardy
- Province: Varese (VA)

Government
  - Mayor: Giuseppe Licata

Area
  - Total: 1.7 km^{2} (0.66 sq mi)

Population (28 February 2017)
  - Total: 1,257
  - Density: 740/km^{2} (1,900/sq mi)
- Time zone: UTC+1 (CET)
  - Summer (DST): UTC+2 (CEST)
- Postal code: 21040
- Dialing code: 0332

Lozza is a comune (municipality) in the Province of Varese in the Italian region Lombardy, located about 45 kilometres (28 mi) northwest of Milan and about 4 kilometres (2 mi) southeast of Varese. As of 31 December 2004, it had a population of 1,112 and an area of 1.7 square kilometres (0.66 mi^{2}).

Lozza borders the following municipalities: Castiglione Olona, Gazzada Schianno, Malnate, Morazzone, Varese, Vedano Olona.

In Roman times, Lozza was on the Via Mediolanum-Bilitio, a Roman road that connected Mediolanum (Milan) with Luganum (Lugano) passing through Varisium (Varese). Lozza was conquered in the early Middle Ages by the Lombards and later by the Franks to become part of the Archbishopric of Milan around 1200.

In 1648 the Castiglioni di Lozza family took control of the town, and Count Marco Fabrizio built a summer resort there.
