= Gornate-Olona =

- Comune
- Comune di Gornate-Olona
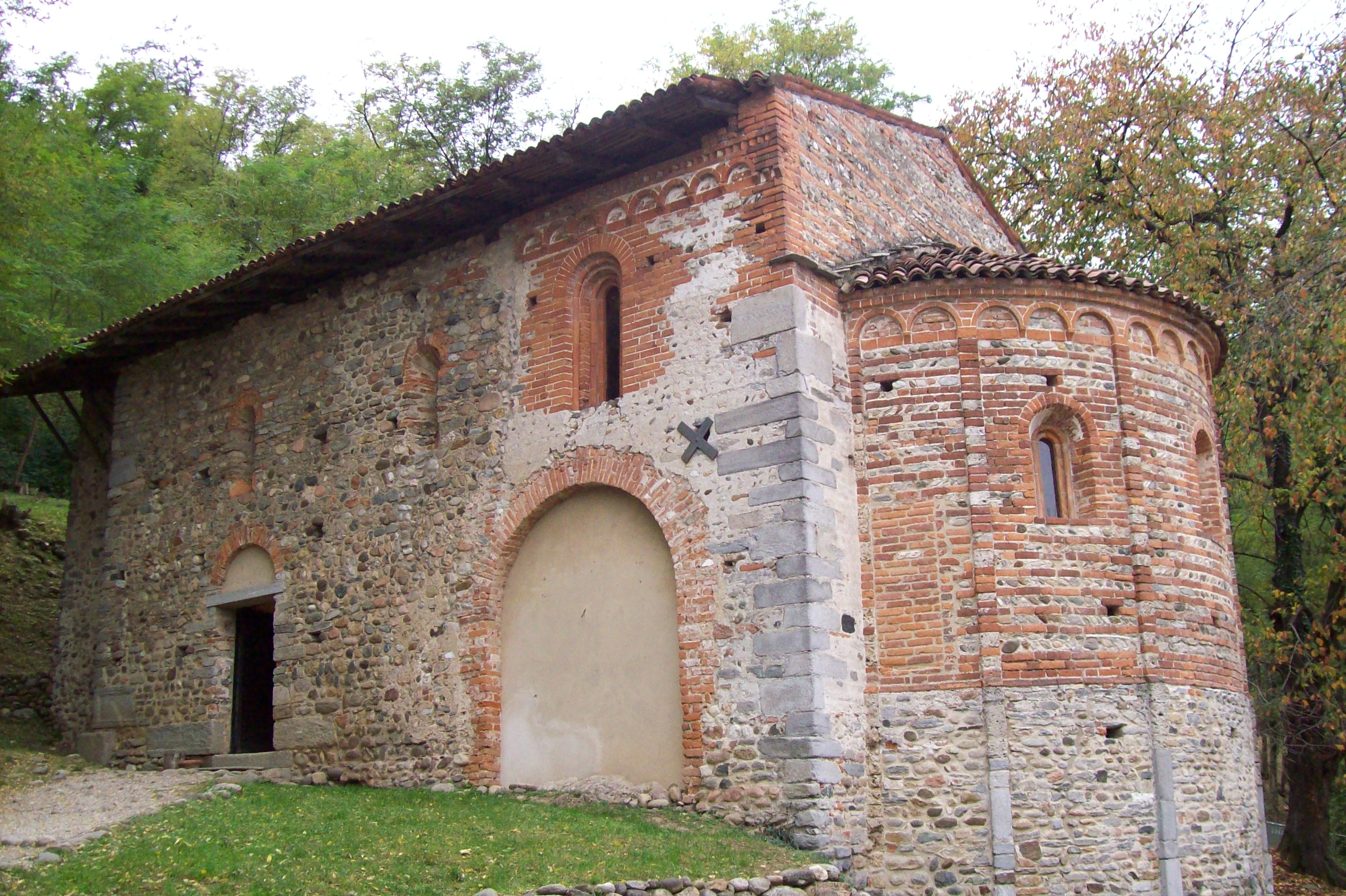

- Location within Italy Location within Lombardy
- Coordinates: 45°44′N 8°52′E
- Country: Italy
- Region: Lombardy
- Province: Province of Varese (VA)
- Frazioni: Bicicera, San Pancrazio, Santa Monica, Torba

Government
  - Mayor: Avv. Barbara Bison

Area
  - Total: 4.8 km^{2} (1.9 sq mi)

Population (Dec. 2015)
  - Total: 2,243
  - Density: 470/km^{2} (1,200/sq mi)
- Demonym: Gornatesi
- Time zone: UTC+1 (CET)
  - Summer (DST): UTC+2 (CEST)
- Postal code: 21040
- Dialing code: 0331
- Patron saint: San Vittore
- Saint day: May 8

Gornate-Olona (Gornà in the local dialect of Lombard language) is a comune (municipality) in the Province of Varese in the Italian region Lombardy, located about 40 kilometres (25 mi) northwest of Milan and about 10 kilometres (6 mi) southeast of Varese. As of 31 December 2015, it had a population of 2,243 and an area of 4.8 square kilometres (1.9 mi^{2}).

Gornate-Olona borders the following municipalities: Carnago, Caronno Varesino, Castelseprio, Castiglione Olona, Lonate Ceppino, Morazzone, Venegono Inferiore.

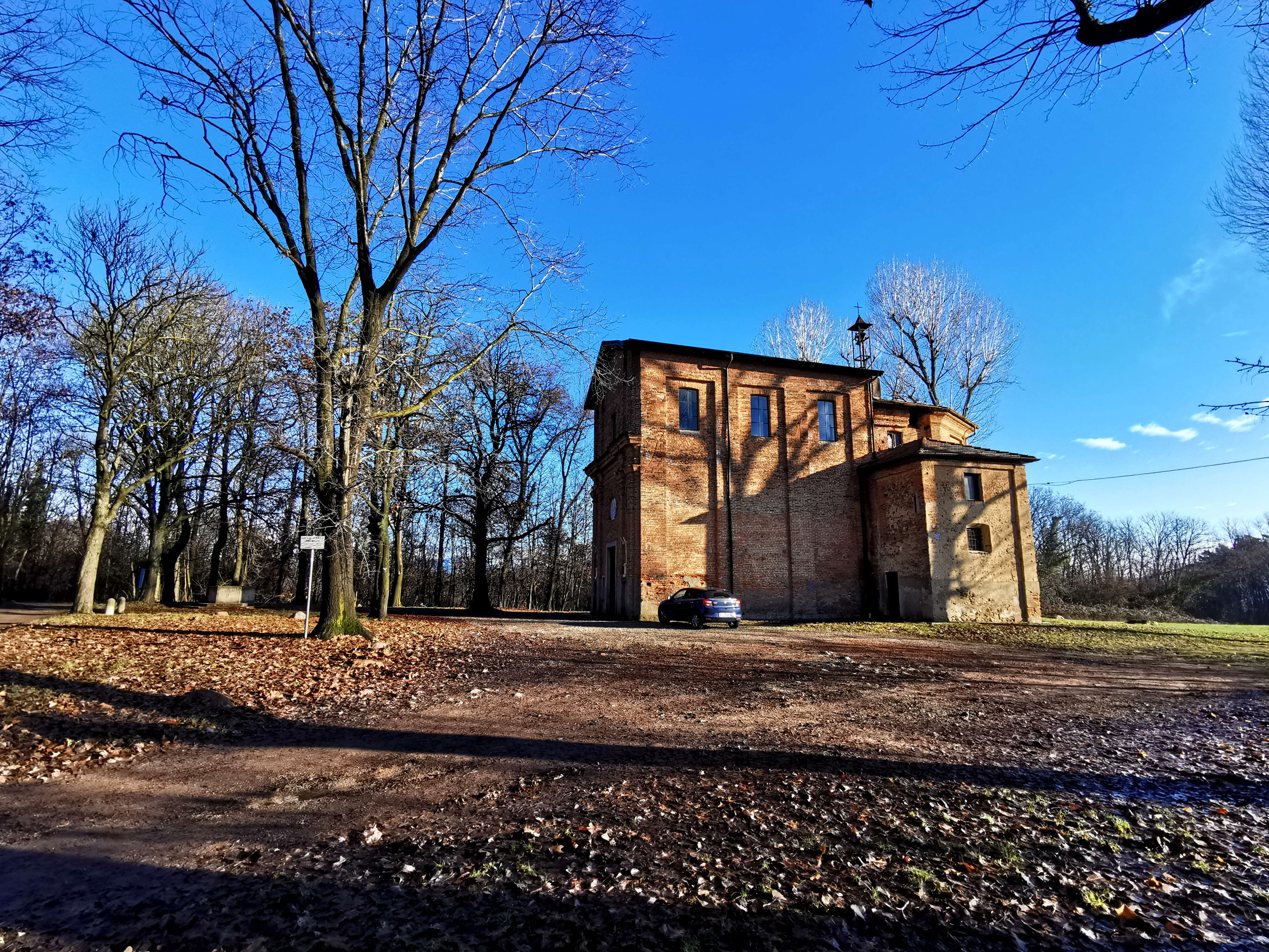
Church of Santa Maria di San Salvatore (Chiesa della Madonnetta)

== Demographic evolution ==
Historical population

| Year | Pop. | ±% |
|---|---|---|
| 1861 | 707 | — |
| 1871 | 766 | +8.3% |
| 1881 | 757 | −1.2% |
| 1901 | 886 | +17.0% |
| 1911 | 997 | +12.5% |

| Year | Pop. | ±% |
|---|---|---|
| 1921 | 1,083 | +8.6% |
| 1931 | 1,042 | −3.8% |
| 1936 | 1,032 | −1.0% |
| 1951 | 1,232 | +19.4% |
| 1961 | 1,476 | +19.8% |

| Year | Pop. | ±% |
|---|---|---|
| 1971 | 1,478 | +0.1% |
| 1981 | 1,578 | +6.8% |
| 1991 | 1,653 | +4.8% |
| 2001 | 1,901 | +15.0% |

Source: Data from ISTAT

== Economy ==
- Abon Plastic, manufacturer of thermoformed plastic packaging
