= Vedano Olona =

- Comune
- Comune di Vedano Olona

- Location within Italy Location within Lombardy
- Coordinates: 45°46′N 8°53′E
- Country: Italy
- Region: Lombardy
- Province: Varese (VA)

Government
  - Mayor: Cristiano Citterio

Area
  - Total: 7.1 km^{2} (2.7 sq mi)
- Elevation: 360 m (1,180 ft)

Population (28 February 2017)
  - Total: 7,400
  - Density: 1,000/km^{2} (2,700/sq mi)
- Demonym: Vedanesi
- Time zone: UTC+1 (CET)
  - Summer (DST): UTC+2 (CEST)
- Postal code: 21040
- Dialing code: 0332

Vedano Olona is a comune (municipality) in the Province of Varese in the Italian region Lombardy, located about 40 kilometres (25 mi) northwest of Milan and about 7 kilometres (4 mi) southeast of Varese.

Vedano Olona borders the following municipalities: Binago, Castiglione Olona, Lozza, Malnate, Varese, Venegono Superiore.
