= Lonate Ceppino =

- Comune
- Comune di Lonate Ceppino
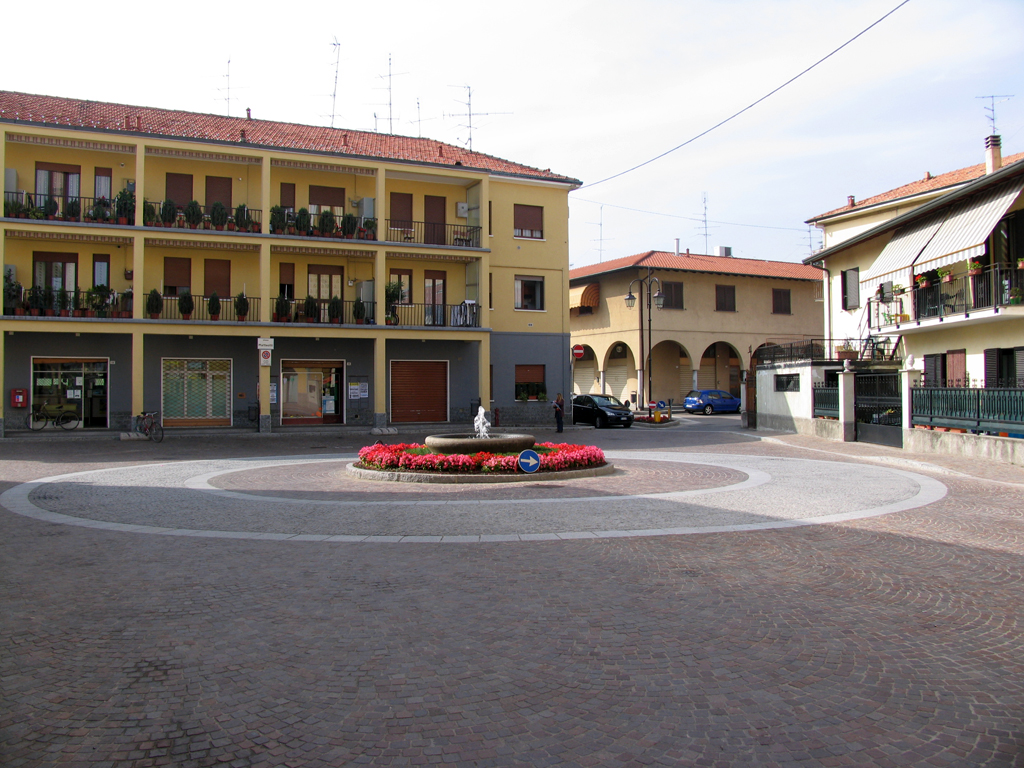

- Coat of arms

- Location within Italy Location within Lombardy
- Coordinates: 45°42′N 8°52′E
- Country: Italy
- Region: Lombardy
- Province: Varese (VA)

Government
  - Mayor: Emanuela Lazzati (Lega Nord)

Area
  - Total: 4.84 km^{2} (1.87 sq mi)

Population (01 January 2016)
  - Total: 4,959
  - Density: 1,020/km^{2} (2,650/sq mi)
- Time zone: UTC+1 (CET)
  - Summer (DST): UTC+2 (CEST)
- Postal code: 21050
- Dialing code: 0331

Lonate Ceppino is a comune (municipality) in the Province of Varese in the Italian region Lombardy, located about 35 kilometres (22 mi) northwest of Milan and about 13 kilometres (8 mi) south of Varese.

Lonate Ceppino borders the following municipalities: Cairate, Castelseprio, Gornate-Olona, Tradate, Venegono Inferiore. It is crossed by the Olona and its affluent, the Bozzone.

The name of the town has Celtic origins. The word Lonate seems to derive from the Celtic word Lona, which means water puddle. The name's origin is also confirmed by the presence of a water spring, which is located near the old church. In ancient times, this water spring was believed to be miraculous.
