= Gazzada Schianno =

- Comune
- Comune di Gazzada Schianno
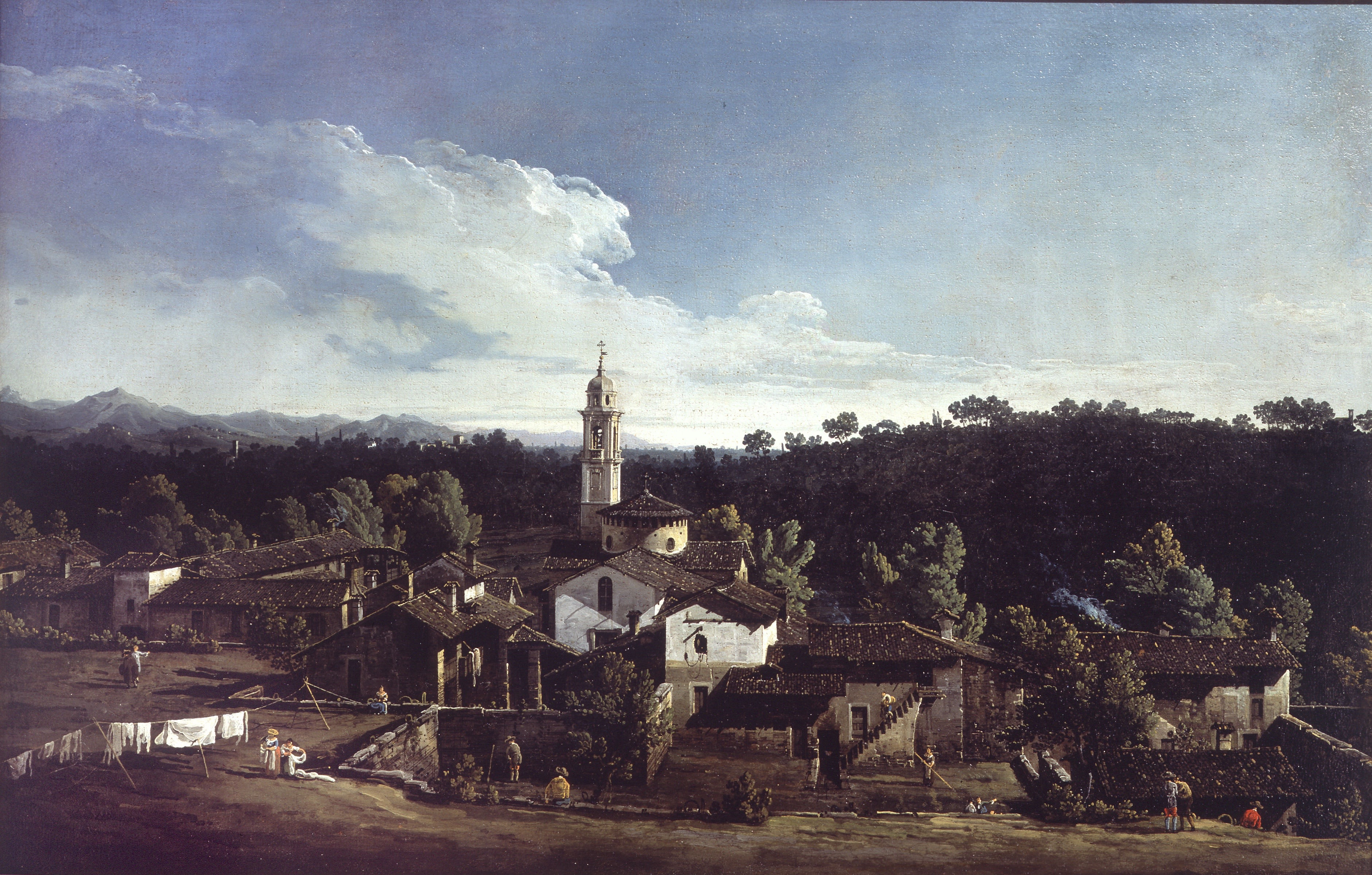

- Coat of arms

- Location within Italy Location within Lombardy
- Coordinates: 45°47′N 8°49′E
- Country: Italy
- Region: Lombardy
- Province: Varese (VA)

Government
  - Mayor: Stefano Frattini (Lega Nord)

Area
  - Total: 4.75 km^{2} (1.83 sq mi)
- Elevation: 368 m (1,207 ft)

Population (31 December 2013)
  - Total: 4,644
  - Density: 978/km^{2} (2,530/sq mi)
- Demonym(s): Schiannesi and Gazzadesi
- Time zone: UTC+1 (CET)
  - Summer (DST): UTC+2 (CEST)
- Postal code: 21045
- Dialing code: 0332

Gazzada Schianno is a comune (municipality) in the Province of Varese in the Italian region Lombardy, located about 45 kilometres (28 mi) northwest of Milan and about 4 kilometres (2 mi) south of Varese. It is served by Gazzada-Schianno-Morazzone railway station.

Gazzada Schianno borders the following municipalities: Brunello, Buguggiate, Lozza, Morazzone, Varese. It is formed by two main localities, Gazzada and Schianno.

Gazzada was the venue in 1967 for discussions between Anglicans and Catholics following the Second Vatican Council.

== Twin towns ==
- Seckach, Germany
