= Morazzone =

- Comune
- Comune di Morazzone
- Coat of arms

- Location within Italy Location within Lombardy
- Coordinates: 45°46′N 8°50′E
- Country: Italy
- Region: Lombardy
- Province: Varese (VA)

Area
  - Total: 5.5 km^{2} (2.1 sq mi)

Population (Dec. 2004)
  - Total: 4,275
  - Density: 780/km^{2} (2,000/sq mi)
- Demonym: Morazzonesi
- Time zone: UTC+1 (CET)
  - Summer (DST): UTC+2 (CEST)
- Postal code: 21040
- Dialing code: 0332
- Patron saint: St. Ambrose
- Saint day: 7 December
- Website: Official website

Morazzone is a comune (municipality) of c. 4,000 inhabitants in the province of Varese in the Italian region Lombardy, located about 40 kilometres (25 mi) northwest of Milan and about 6 kilometres (4 mi) south of Varese. It is served by Gazzada-Schianno-Morazzone railway station.

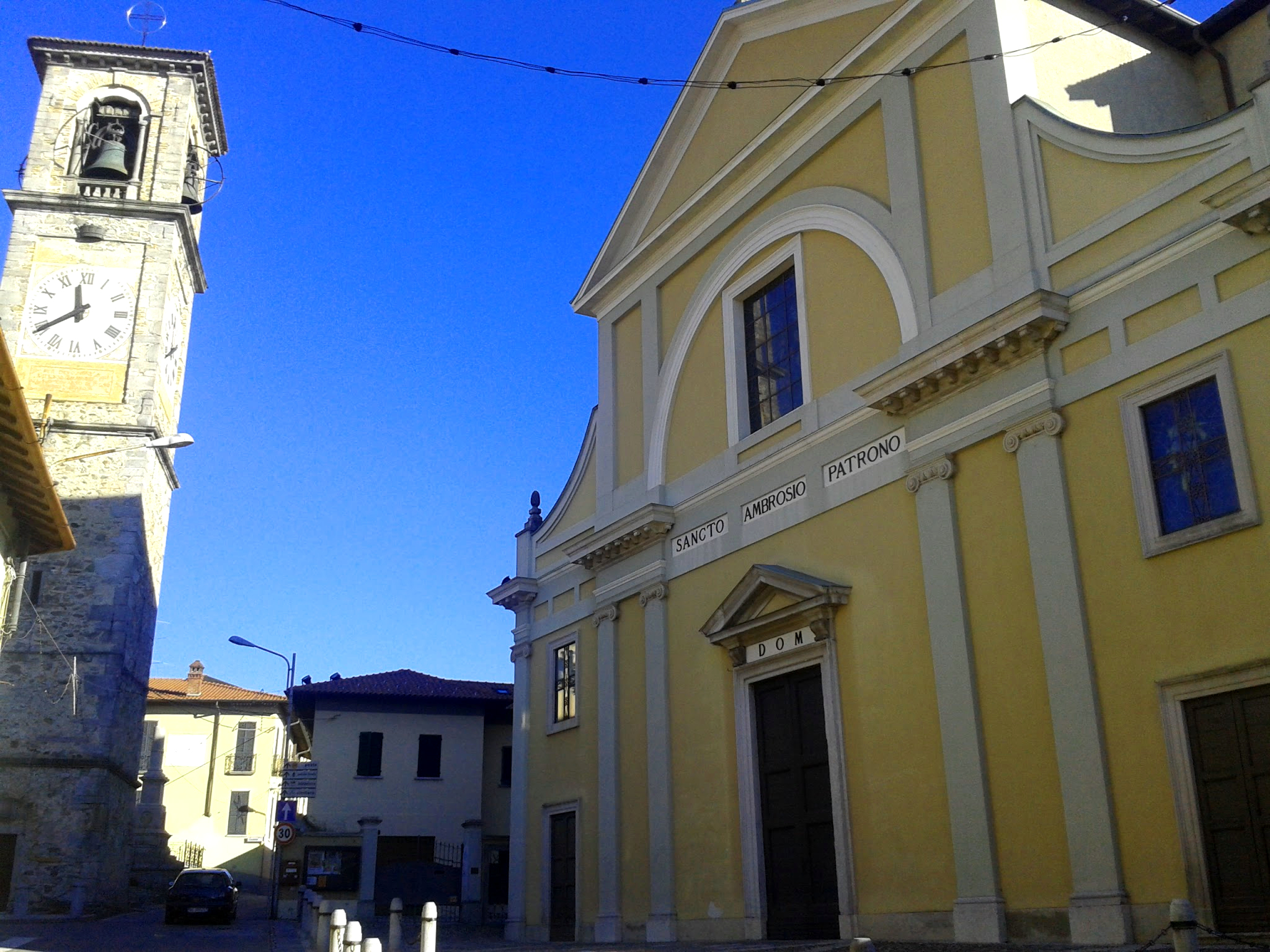
Church of Sant'Ambrogio with the bell tower

Old coat of arms

Morazzone borders the following municipalities: Brunello, Caronno Varesino, Castiglione Olona, Castronno, Gazzada Schianno, Gornate-Olona, Lozza.

== Sister towns ==
- Wimblington, England, United Kingdom (2007);
- Békésszentandrás, Hungary (2016).

== Demographic evolution ==
Historical population

Year	Pop.	±%
1861	1,413	—
1871	1,479	+4.7%
1881	1,583	+7.0%
1901	1,759	+11.1%
1911	1,871	+6.4%

Year	Pop.	±%
1921	1,931	+3.2%
1931	1,915	−0.8%
1936	1,763	−7.9%
1951	2,185	+23.9%
1961	2,854	+30.6%

Year	Pop.	±%
1971	3,744	+31.2%
1981	3,867	+3.3%
1991	4,069	+5.2%
2001	4,187	+2.9%

Source: Data from ISTAT
