= Castelseprio, Lombardy =

Castelseprio
- Comune
- Comune di Castelseprio
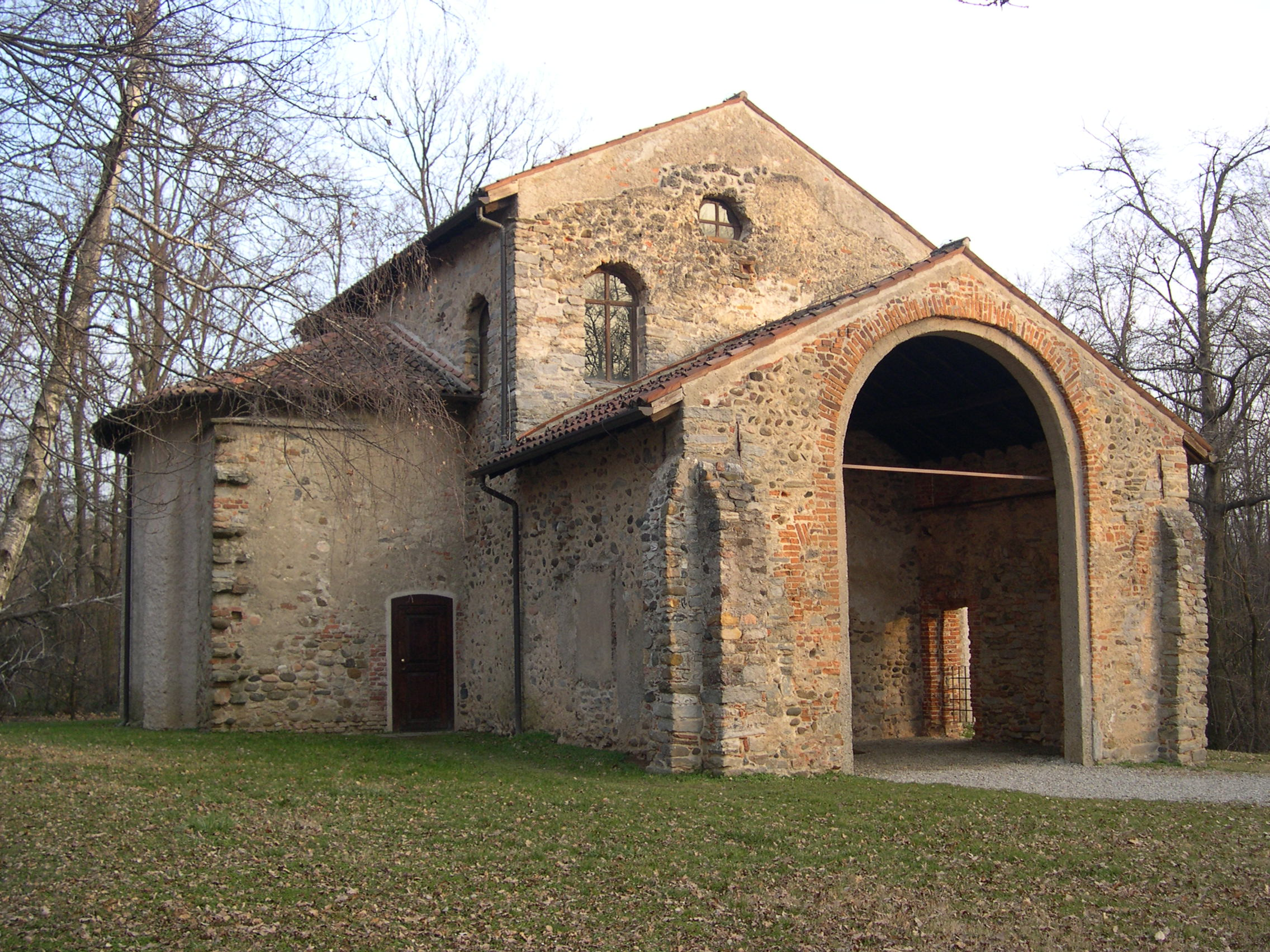
- The Church of Santa Maria foris portas

- Coat of arms

- Location within Italy Location within Lombardy
- Coordinates: 45°43′N 8°52′E
- Country: Italy
- Region: Lombardy
- Province: Varese (VA)

Area
  - Total: 3.9 km^{2} (1.5 sq mi)

Population (Dec. 2004)
  - Total: 1,276
  - Density: 330/km^{2} (850/sq mi)
- Demonym: Sepriesi
- Time zone: UTC+1 (CET)
  - Summer (DST): UTC+2 (CEST)
- Postal code: 21050
- Dialing code: 0331
- Website: Official website

Castelseprio is a comune (municipality) in the Province of Varese in the Italian region Lombardy, located about 35 kilometres (22 mi) northwest of Milan and about 11 kilometres (7 mi) south of Varese, bordering the municipalities of Cairate, Carnago, Gornate-Olona and Lonate Ceppino.

The main centre, formerly known as Vico Seprio (a name still in informal local use) is near the historically significant ruins of the ancient and medieval city of Castelseprio, which are today in an archaeological zone open to the public at the normal hours. The site is most famous for the Byzantinesque frescos in the small Church of Santa Maria foris portas, a UNESCO World Heritage Site since 2011.

The modern village of Castelseprio has a population of 1,276 and area of 3.9 square kilometres (1.5 mi^{2}).

== Demographic evolution ==
Historical population

Year	Pop.	±%
1861	500	—
1871	547	+9.4%
1881	557	+1.8%
1901	584	+4.8%
1911	648	+11.0%

Year	Pop.	±%
1921	602	−7.1%
1931	590	−2.0%
1936	562	−4.7%
1951	732	+30.2%
1961	866	+18.3%

Year	Pop.	±%
1971	923	+6.6%
1981	1,077	+16.7%
1991	1,097	+1.9%
2001	1,237	+12.8%

Source: Data from ISTAT
