= Fagnano Olona =

- Comune
- Comune di Fagnano Olona
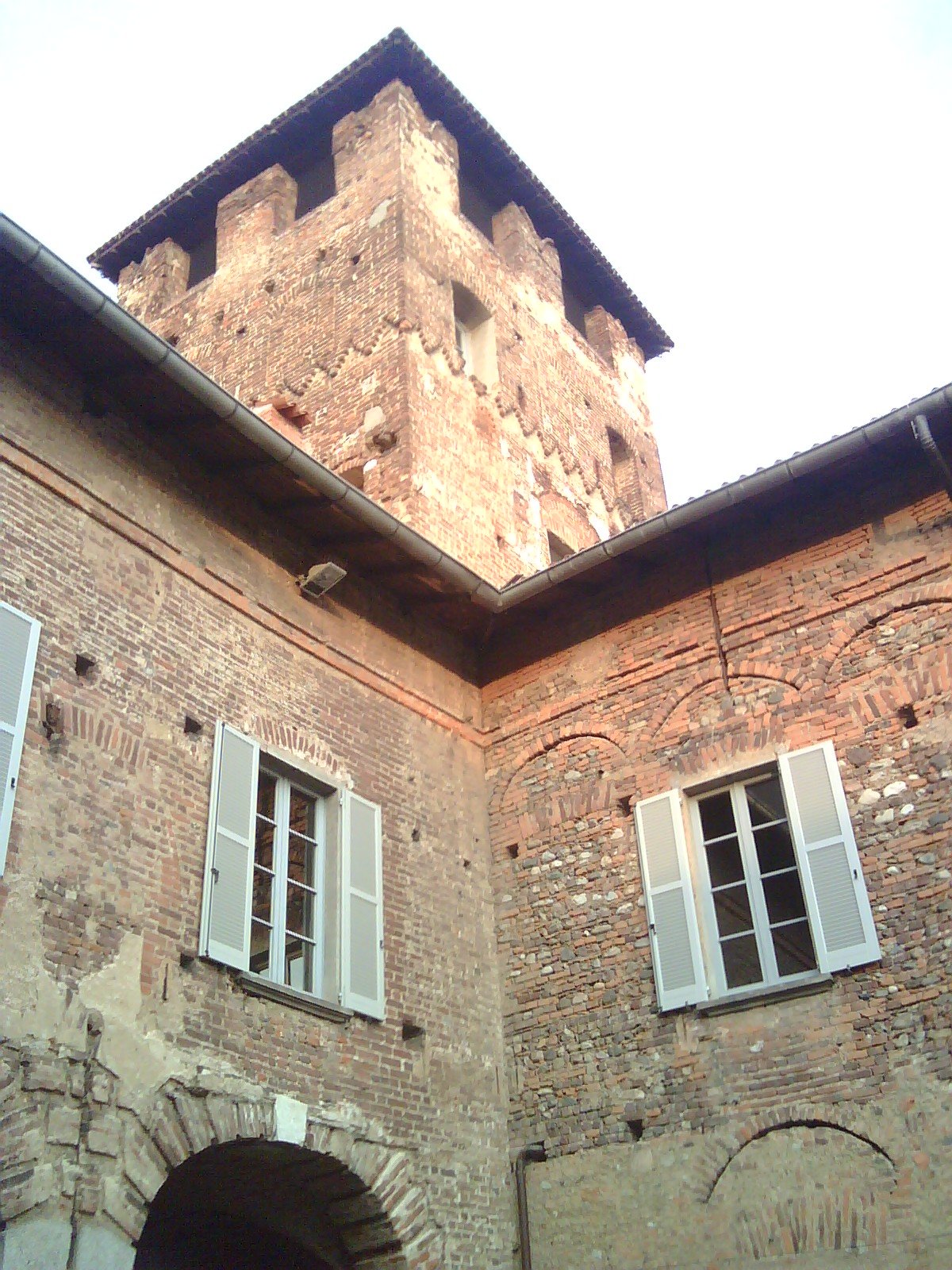

- Coat of arms

- Location within Italy Location within Lombardy
- Coordinates: 45°40′N 08°52′E
- Country: Italy
- Region: Lombardy
- Province: Varese (VA)
- Frazioni: Bergoro

Government
  - Mayor: Marco Baroffio

Area
  - Total: 8.63 km^{2} (3.33 sq mi)
- Elevation: 265 m (869 ft)

Population (July 2024)
  - Total: 12.436
  - Density: 1.44/km^{2} (3.73/sq mi)
- Demonym(s): Fagnanesi (borgo), Bergoresi (frazione)
- Time zone: UTC+1 (CET)
  - Summer (DST): UTC+2 (CEST)
- Postal code: 21054
- Dialing code: 0331
- ISTAT code: 012067
- Patron saint: San Gaudenzio (borgo), San Giovanni Battista (frazione)
- Website: Official website

Fagnano Olona is a town and comune located in the province of Varese, in the Lombardy region of northern Italy.
