= Cassano Magnago =

- Comune
- Comune di Cassano Magnago
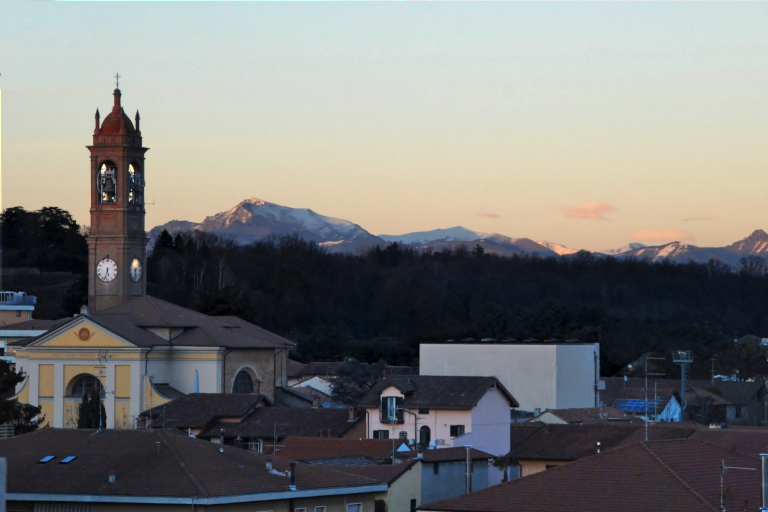

- Coat of arms

- Location within Italy Location within Lombardy
- Coordinates: 45°41′N 8°50′E
- Country: Italy
- Region: Lombardy
- Province: Varese (VA)

Government
  - Mayor: Pietro Ottaviani

Area
  - Total: 12 km^{2} (4.6 sq mi)
- Elevation: 261 m (856 ft)

Population (31 December 2004)
  - Total: 20,754
  - Density: 1,700/km^{2} (4,500/sq mi)
- Demonym: Cassanesi
- Time zone: UTC+1 (CET)
  - Summer (DST): UTC+2 (CEST)
- Postal code: 21012
- Dialing code: 0331
- Patron saint: St. Maurice
- Saint day: September 22
- Website: Official website

Cassano Magnago is a town and comune in the province of Varese, Lombardy, Italy.

== Notable people ==
- Ivan Basso (b 1977), road cycling champion
- Umberto Bossi (1941–2026), politician born here
- Lea Del Bo Rossi (1903–1978), medical researcher born here
