= Malnate =

Malnate Malnate
- Comune
- Comune di Malnate
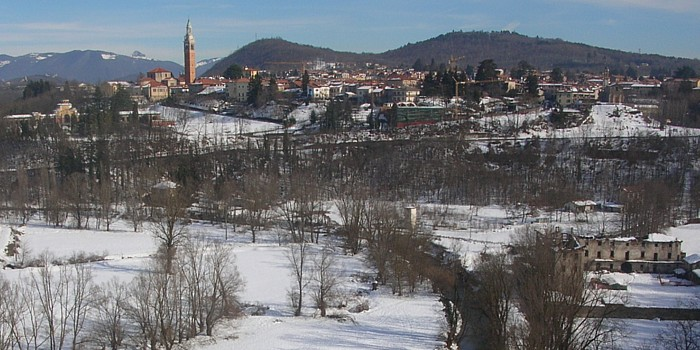

- Coat of arms

- Location within Italy Location within Lombardy
- Coordinates: 45°48′N 08°53′E
- Country: Italy
- Region: Lombardy
- Province: Varese (VA)
- Frazioni: Folla, Gurone, Rovera, San Salvatore

Government
  - Mayor: Nadia Cannito (PD)

Area
  - Total: 8 km^{2} (3.1 sq mi)
- Elevation: 355 m (1,165 ft)

Population (31 December 2020)
  - Total: 16,375
  - Density: 2,000/km^{2} (5,300/sq mi)
- Demonym: Malnatesi
- Time zone: UTC+1 (CET)
  - Summer (DST): UTC+2 (CEST)
- Postal code: 21046
- Dialing code: 0332
- Patron saint: San Martino di Tours
- Website: Official website

Malnate is a comune (municipality) in the province of Varese, in the Italian region of Lombardy. It lies in a mountainous region approximately 30 miles (48 km) north of Milan, in the foothills of the Alps near the border between Italy and Switzerland.

Curiosities and historical facts about Malnate can be found in the book "La Cava", published by Macchione Editore and, starting in 1994, released yearly in December.
