= Cantoni Cotton Mill =

Defunct Italian cotton company

- Native name: Cotonificio Cantoni
- Company type: Private
- Industry: Textiles
- Founded: 1828; 198 years ago in Legnano, Italy
- Founder: Camillo Borgomanero and Costanzo Cantoni
- Defunct: 2004
- Headquarters: Legnano, Italy
- Products: Diverse textile products
- Revenue: 40.228.000.000 lire (1972)
- Number of employees: 5,578 (1972)

45°35′43.32″N 8°55′8.83″E

The Cantoni Cotton Mill, or Cotonificio Cantoni (Cantunificiu in the dialect of Legnano) was a textile company active between 1828 and 2004. It was for a long time the largest cotton company in Italy.

== History ==
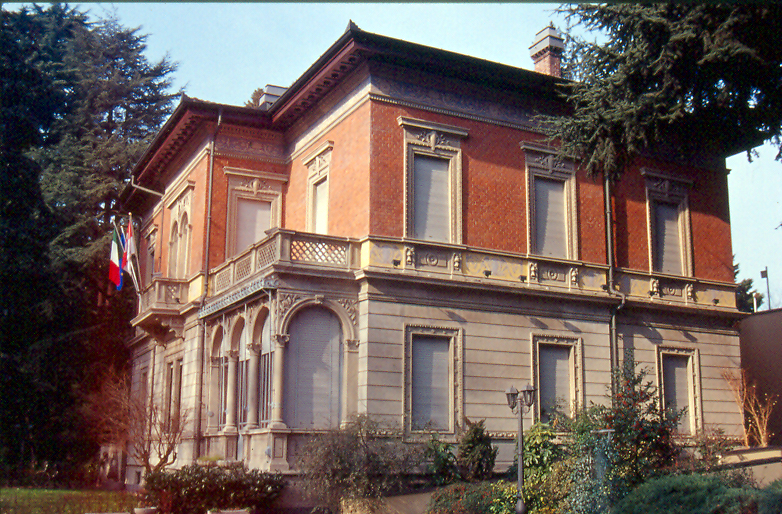
Villa Jucker, a historic building in Legnano built from 1905 to 1906 by the Cantoni Cotton Mill

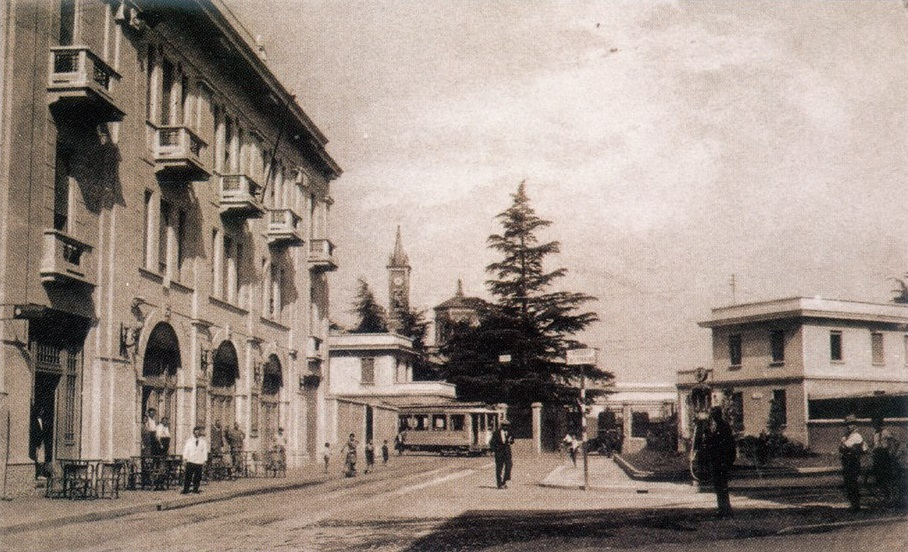
Piazza IV Novembre and, on the left, the Legnano City Theater in 1930. In the center, in the background, just to the right of the cedar tree, can be seen the main entrance to the Cantoni Cotton Mill

The original nucleus of the Cantoni Cotton Mill was a spinning mill opened in 1828 in Legnano. On October 2, 1830, the plants that had sprung up along the Olona River, which used the motive power of the river to move, were tested. This was a pre-industrial activity that arose along the banks of the waterway that was owned by Camillo Borgomanero. A document from 1835 shows that Costanzo Cantoni was a partner in the enterprise. In the middle of the 19th century, during the Second Industrial Revolution, the craft business was transformed into a company.

In 1855 Cantoni was the only company from Lombardy to take part in the World's Fair in Paris, while in 1872 the firm changed its name to “Società Anonima Cotonificio Cantoni”, thus becoming the first Italian cotton company to transform itself into a joint-stock company and to be listed on the Milan Stock Exchange, where it remained until 1998. Andrea Ponti was its first president. Even after the listing on the Stock Exchange, control of the cotton mills remained under the control of the Cantoni family. The family continued to have absolute control over the company.

The Cantoni family still held the majority shareholding, however, as Costanzo Cantoni had shares worth 1 million liras and his son Eugenio had shares worth 2 million 750,000 lire against a total capital of 7 million lire. Eugenio Cantoni was the head of the company, having been elected general manager. In 1877 Eugenio Cantoni resigned from that position following an internal and external corporate crisis. From 1880 the company returned to growth after a period of crisis. In 1887 customs tariffs were instituted in Italy, and these protectionist measures, designed primarily for small companies, also benefited Cantoni. Cotton mill development continued even during the years of crisis in the Italian cotton industry, which occurred between 1891 and 1893. This growth was mainly due to the fact that the company had also turned its attention to export.

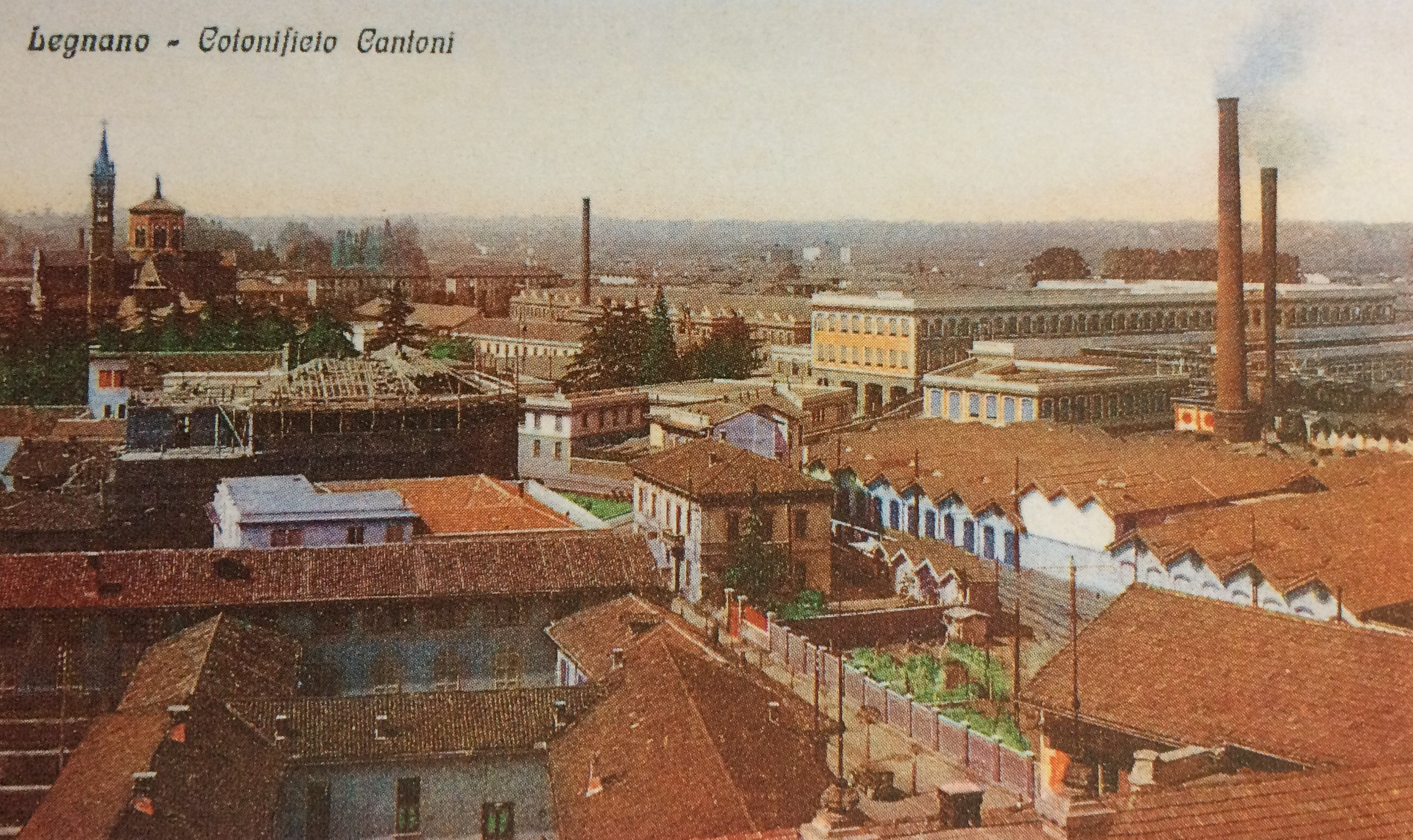
View of the historic Cantoni Cotton Mill's Legnano plant in 1920

Between 1905 and 1906, the Cantoni Cotton Mill built Villa Jucker in Legnano, a typical example of an early 20th-century manor house; in 1976 this building complex, which was originally the home of the Cantoni Cotton Mill executive family of the same name, became the headquarters of the local association Famiglia Legnanese.

The cotton mill's greatest expansion occurred at the beginning of the 20th century. In the period between 1906 and 1907, Cantoni Cotton Mill was one of the Italian companies to have the largest capital increase. By the end of the first decade of the 20th century, Cantoni Cotton Mill had reached 1,500 workers and 1,350 looms. In 1908 the building of the first workers' houses began. The buildings were constructed on Pontida Street in Legnano. Elementary schools recognized by the Italian state were also built, which were intended for the workers' offspring. The Cantoni family left the board of directors of the cotton mill in 1910 with the resignation of Costanzo Cantoni, son of Eugenio and thus grandson of the company's namesake co-founder. In 1912 the company reached a production peak, recording a difference, compared to the previous year, of one and a half million kilos of fabrics.

During World War I the cotton mill was in trouble due to the blockage of raw materials, which came mainly from Germany. During the conflict the company converted its facilities to the production of war supplies.

After the end of the war more housing was built. Until 1925 the cotton mill manufactured 114 dwellings in Legnano between Via Pontida, Via Volta, Galvani, and Via Monte Grappa. A gymnasium and a kindergarten were built on Galvani Street in 1928. Near the latter was built the dopolavoro. From 1920 to 1927 the Regina Elena Sanatorium, a medical facility aimed at the treatment of tuberculosis, was built in Legnano: the funds for its construction were provided for a quarter by the Cantoni Cotton Mill and for the remainder by popular subscriptions and a number of institutions.

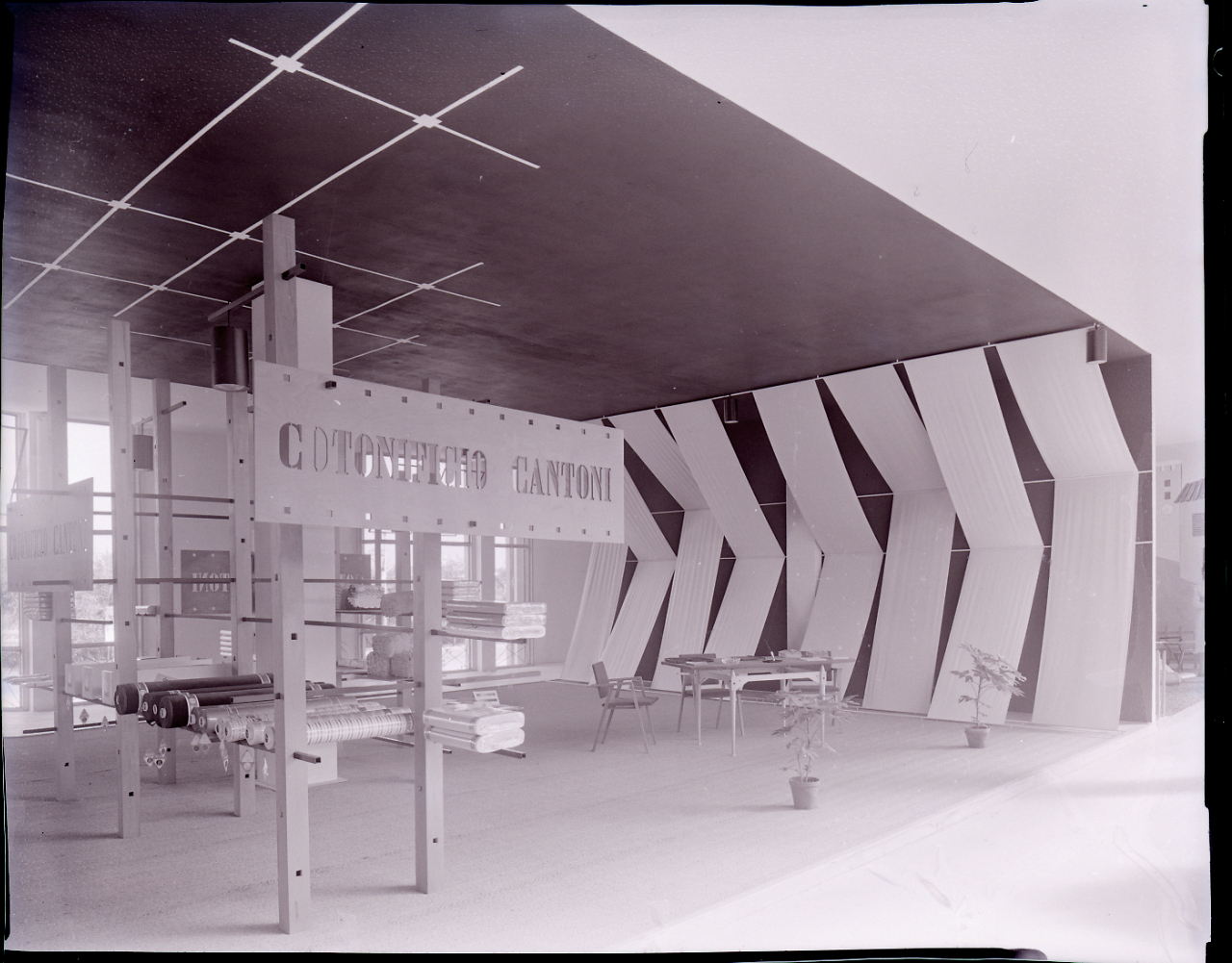
Office layout designed by Albe Steiner for the Cantoni Cotton Mill, photographed by Paolo Monti in 1958

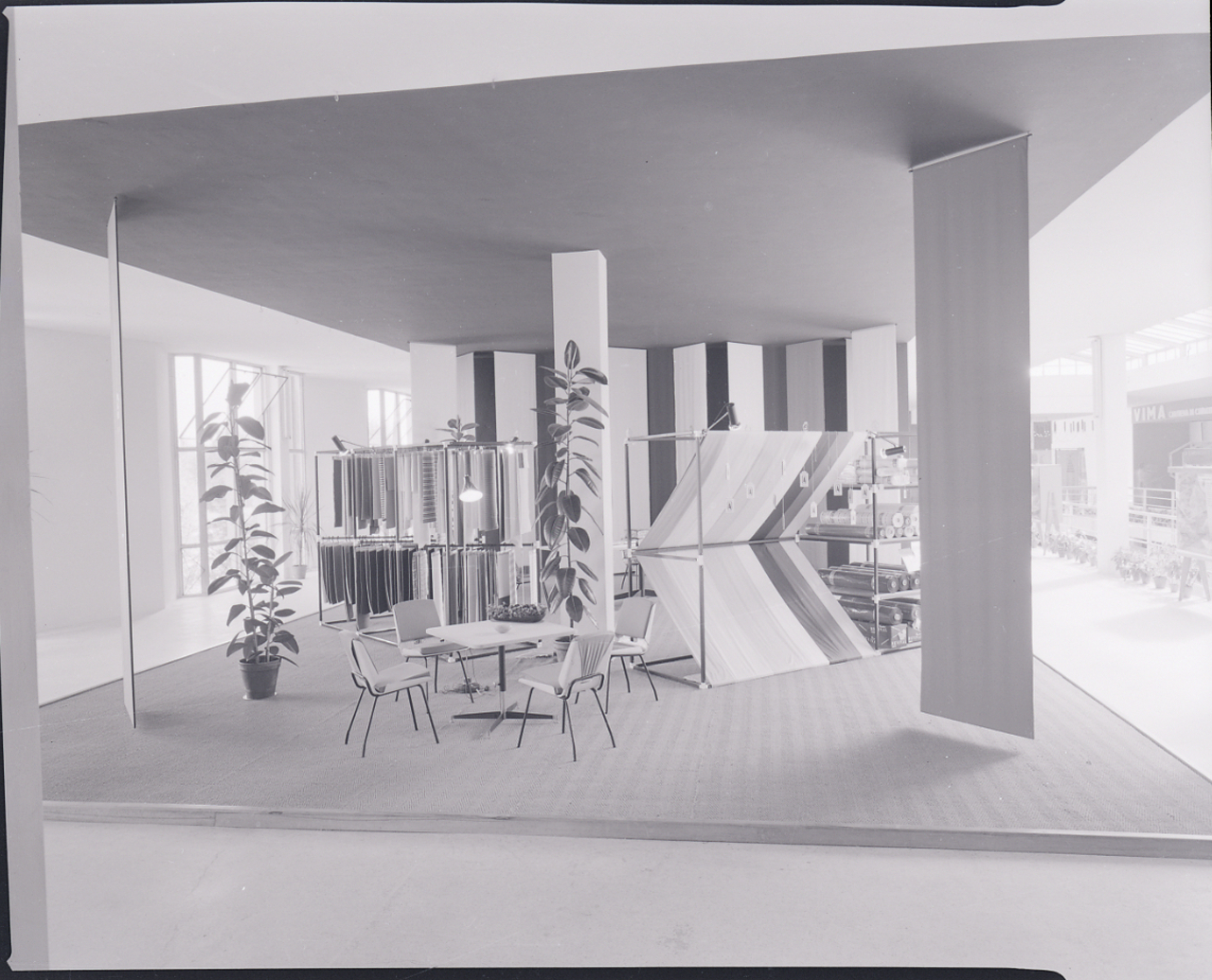
Office layout designed by Albe Steiner for the Cantoni Cotton Mill, photographed by Paolo Monti in 1958

At the outbreak of World War II (1940), the company was forced to allocate the facilities to war production. As with the First World War, Cantoni was in difficulty with the supply of raw materials. Despite the wartime events, however, the cotton mill continued to grow during this decade.

Expansion continued until 1951, when there was a downturn that prompted the company to invest. The trend was then still positive from 1954 onward. In the 1960s, decline began due to the gradual industrialization of developing countries. In order to succeed in overcoming a crisis that occurred in 1963, the Cantoni Cotton Mill decided to change the type of production from plain fabrics to printed fabrics: in this way, the manufactured goods were no longer common and widely consumed, but rather valuable products with a higher technological content. With this change in strategy, Cantoni was able to overcome the crisis and expand its facilities with the purchase, in 1968, of several factories from De Angeli Frua, which brought, to the company's workforce, another 1,000 employees; this figure brought the total workforce to 5,000 employees.

The crisis continued and deepened in the 1970s. The irreversible crisis, for the Cantoni Cotton Mill, began in the second part of the 1970s, complicit in the rise in the price of raw materials and energy sources, both caused by some events that occurred at the beginning of the decade, such as the inconvertibility of the dollar (1971), the oil crisis and the Yom Kippur War (both in 1973), which were added to the difficulties caused by the rise in labor costs and competition from foreign industrial systems. This was compounded by Cantoni's accumulated debts, which were attributable to excessive inventories in warehouses of printed fabrics: it was at this time that fashion changed, favoring plain fabrics.

In 1981 Cantoni Cotton Mill's indebtedness touched 160 billion lire. In the early 1980s the company's owner was Montedison. Later, in 1984, the majority shareholding in the cotton mill was acquired by Fabio Inghirami. Cantoni then launched a reorganization project, but the operations did not achieve the desired results. This led to an unsustainable financial situation that caused the gradual closure of all factories. The last factory to end operations was the Legnano factory in the Olmina district, which closed its doors in 2004.

== Plants and production ==
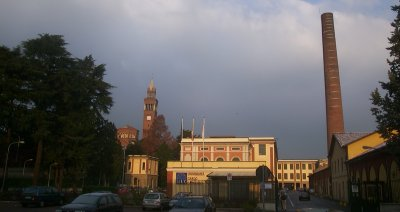
The former Cantoni Cotton Mill in Castellanza, site of University Carlo Cattaneo

In addition to the historic one established in Legnano along the Olona River, the Cantoni family founded other cotton mills. They opened factories in Castellanza (1845), Cordenons (1865), Bellano (1870), and Legnano in the Olmina district (1960). Minor factories were opened in Canegrate and Gallarate (Cantoni-Introini weaving mill). Many other factories were incorporated by Cantoni Cotton Mill thanks to some purchasing operations that the Legnano company made against some competing companies. For example, in 1968, Cantoni Cotton Mill acquired De Angeli-Frua. Cantoni then took possession of the factories in Fagnano Olona (formerly Stamperia e tintoria F.lli Tronconi, 1967), Ponte Nossa (formerly De Angeli-Frua, 1968), Arluno (formerly Cotonificio Carlo Dell'Acqua, 1969), and Saronno (formerly De Angeli-Frua, 1968). In addition to the production sites, Cantoni also owned real estate.

As far as production is concerned, in 1972 the spinning plants were within the Cordenons, Arluno, Bellano, Castellanza and Ponte Nossa factories, and the weaving plants were within those of Legnano Olmina, Castellanza, Ponte Nossa as well as in the historic Legnanese factory built along the Olona River. Also in the same year examined, the printing plants were within the Saronno and Fagnano Olona factories, while the dyeing plants were contained in the two Legnano factories. The historic Legnano factory also contained the velvet finishing plants. Thanks to the presence of a full range of machinery, the company was able to arrive at the finished product from raw materials. In total, in 1972, Cantoni Cotton Mill's facilities contained 2,724 looms, 235,002 spindles and 15 printing plants. The company also had a thermoelectric power plant that was located within the historic Legnano plant and 8 hydroelectric plants. Together these systems produced about half of the electricity needed to run the plants.

== Legnano plant ==
=== Origins ===
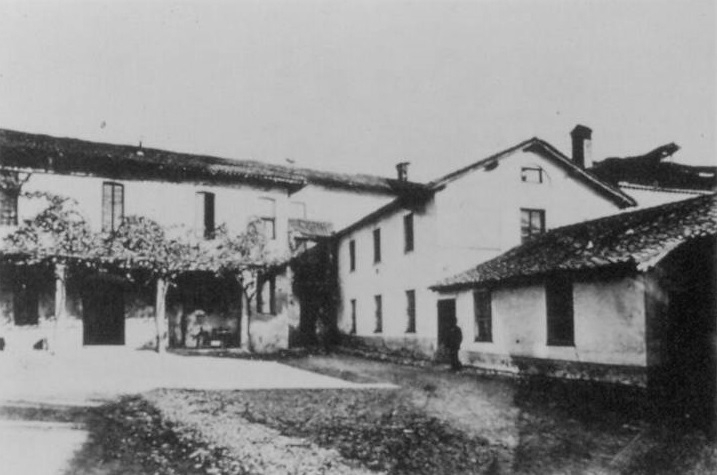
The Pomponio (or Prata) mill in an 1881 image. It was located along the Olonella River at the height of current Piazza IV Novembre.

In the early history of the Legnano plant, the motive power that powered the machinery was derived from the Olona River. At that time, in order to open a new business that took advantage of the stream's currents or to install a new water wheel, prior permission had to be sought from the “Olona River Administration”. If permission was granted, a sum of money had to be paid to the aforementioned body. The spinning activity of the future Cantoni Cotton Mill took advantage of the existing water mills on the river. In fact, thanks to them, Cantoni and the other businesses that arose along the river derived the energy needed to move the machinery. To make them fit for purpose, Cantoni suitably modified these milling facilities, which were originally intended for grinding agricultural products.

Borgomenero and Cantoni, in the early days of the cotton mill's history, purchased several mills. As a prelude to the founding of Cantoni, Camillo Borgomanero purchased the Isacco mill (formerly owned by the Lampugnani family) in 1819 and the Melzi mill in 1828. Testing of the first facilities of the future cotton mill took place on October 2, 1830. Costanzo Cantoni instead acquired the Cornaggia-Medici mill in 1841, which was followed by others. In a document dated March 27, 1847, one can read, "[...] Mr. Cantoni Owner of two united mills placed on the Olona, the first said to be Pomponio's on the map at No. 1632. It was sold by the noble Mr. Marquis Cornaggia sold in the year 1831 to the firm Bazzoni & Sperati, and then in 1841 purchased by Mr. Cantoni [...]". These milling facilities were very old. For example, the mill purchased in 1828 by Camillo Borgomanero belonged to the Melzi family since 1162. In terms of production, from 500 spindles in 1836 the cotton mill grew to 1,760 in 1838. Thanks to a subsequent improvement of the facilities, in 1845 there was a further increase in the number of spindles for spinning, which in fact reached 3,546. Between 1820 and 1830 the first modifications were made to the Olona riverbed.

=== Late 19th century ===
A carpenters' and mechanics' workshop was built in 1860. In 1862 the cotton mill took possession of 30 pertica of vacant land and two other mills belonging to the Mensa Arcivescovile of Milan that stood along current Via Pontida. In order to increase the motive power drawn from the river, in 1860 some work began on the Olona in the stretch that crossed the northern part of the cotton mill. The course of the river was rectified with the excavation of a new riverbed - almost straight - which led to the elimination of the natural bends of the watercourse. In 1890 similar work was carried out on the southern stretch.

An artificial canal (the Cantoni Canal, completed in 1868) was also built for use by the factory. The demolition of the old mills that stood on the banks of the Olona dates from this period. These were in fact replaced by more modern plants that used more efficient water wheels.

In 1874 the Cantoni cotton mill took possession of an area located between the Olonella and the Cantoni Canal where there was also a dyehouse belonging to the Moranti brothers. Cantoni in these years, as shown in an 1876 document kept in the Legnano Municipal Archives, was, among the Legnano industries, regarded as the leading one in terms of organization and technology. Among the textile companies in Legnano, only Cantoni combined spinning and weaving by including a considerable number of mechanical looms driven not only by the hydraulic force originated by the Olona River, but also by the energy produced by steam engines. During these years the company made investments in upgrading the factory; a new spinning wing was built (1882) and a new steam engine was implanted to replace the previous two, saving a considerable amount of coal (1888). Several new bridges were also built over the Olonella, Cantoni Canal and the original Olona riverbed (now abandoned). In 1885 about 50 meters of the Olona were covered for the enlargement of the textile (left bank) and velvet (right bank) dyeing departments.

In 1896 Countess Barbara Melzi leased to the Cantoni Cotton Mill for a period of 25 years a large piece of land, while granting permission to rectify the riverbed of the Olona also in the section that crossed her property. In the following years other areas were taken over, which brought the area of the factory close to the maximum size reached in the 20th century. In 1899 the cotton mill built a large water tank near the area of the mill purchased in 1841 and later demolished, that is, between the original Olona riverbed and the Sempione road.

=== Early 20th century ===
The final appearance of the cotton mill was achieved in the early 20th century. In the following decades, in fact, there were no major changes in the overall structure of the mill. The cotton mill was electrified in 1902. Power was supplied by the Lombard Company for a total delivered power of 3500 kW. During these years the spinning department was transferred to the Castellanza plant. Weaving and dyeing remained in Legnano. In 1904 new sheds were built on the still vacant land. Specifically, a pavilion for the fabric finishing stage, a warehouse for raw fabrics and a workshop were built.

In 1907 Carlo Jucker became director. During his leadership, substantial investments were made in the factory. Between 1907 and 1908 a new brick weaving shed was built, within which about a thousand new looms were placed, 240 of them of the Jacquard type. Also from this period is the enlargement of the sheds containing the packaging and finishing facilities, as well as the inauguration of the velvet and gauze cutting departments. A new bleaching department with state-of-the-art equipment was then built, and the finishing department was modernized.

=== Interwar period ===
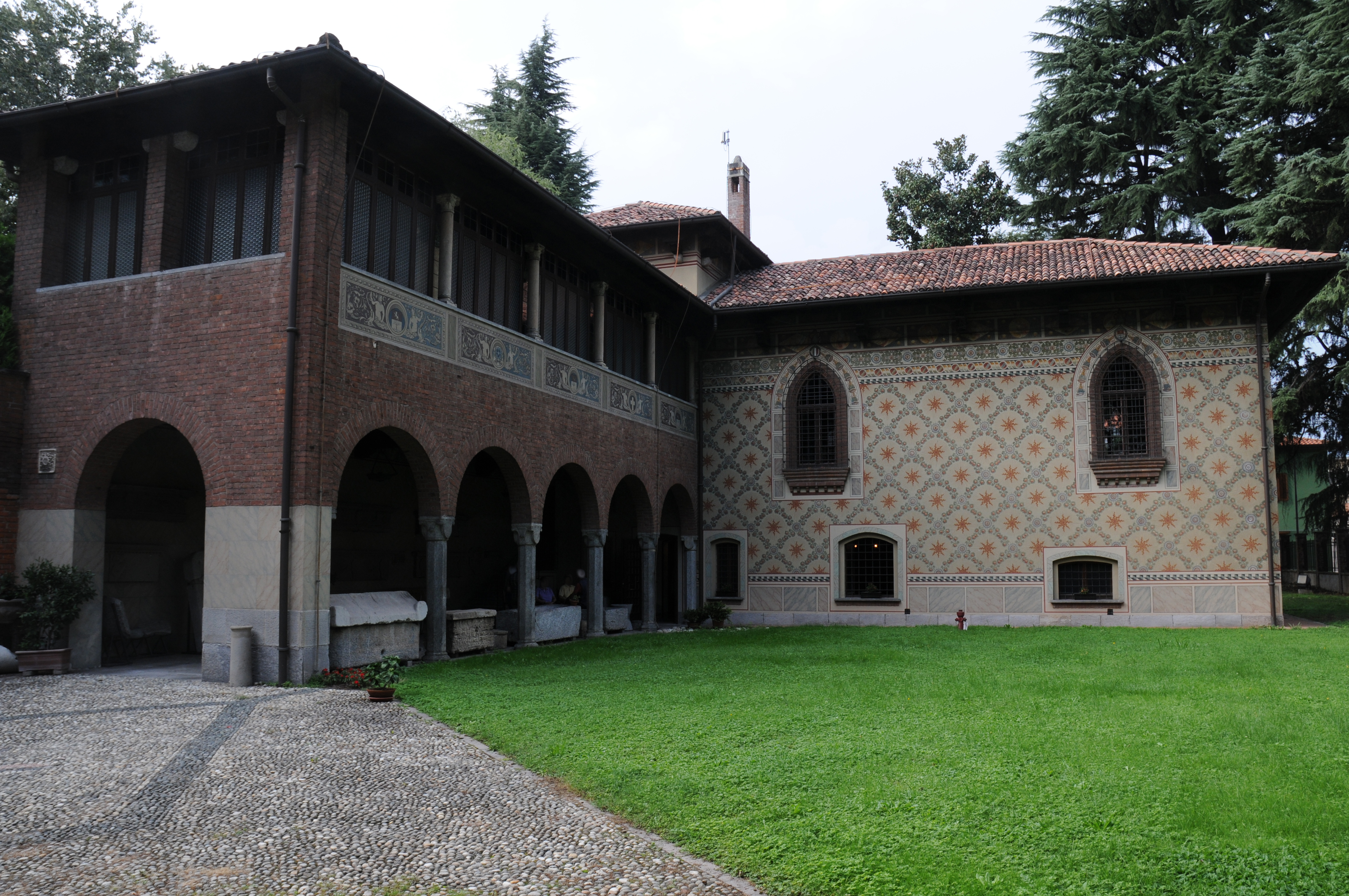
The Guido Sutermeister Museum. Some of the material used to build it came from the 15th-century mansion house that belonged to the Lampugnani family that overlooked the Olona River and was demolished (1927) in order to allow for the expansion of the factory

In 1917, a flood of the Olona caused severe damage to the plant. Therefore, after the war was over, new embankments were built and the Olona was channeled. Although the river was already heavily polluted, it had not yet been covered. During these years, a villa from the first half of the 19th century adjacent to the entrance of the cotton mill (formerly owned by a local aristocratic family, the Prandonis), became the new headquarters of the technical management offices. Between 1919 and 1923 the cotton mill invested in upgrading some of its facilities and purchasing new looms. Between 1925 and after World War II, the Olona was covered.

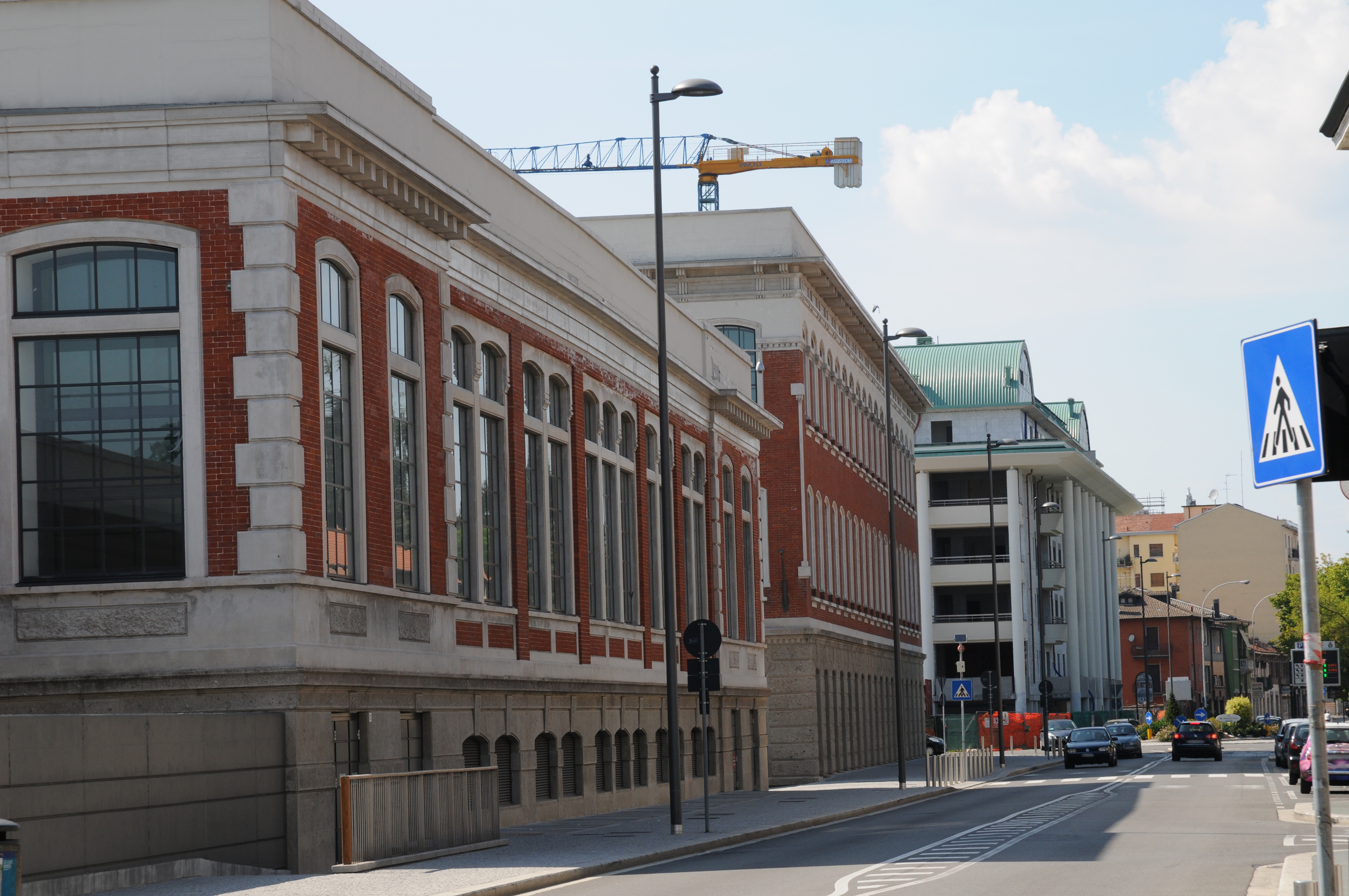
On the left, the restored facades of the warehouses of the former Cantoni cotton mill in Legnano. They are the only surviving part of the manufacturing complex along the Olona River

In 1931 the new pavilions for velvet processing were inaugurated. The buildings became the most important in the cotton mill from an architectural point of view. The facades of these buildings are the only part of the cotton mill that was spared from demolition in the 21st century. The trees in the entrance plaza also remain, some of which date back to the early 20th century. It is from these years (1927) that the demolition of the Lampugnani Manor, a fifteenth-century mansion house that belonged to the Lampugnani family, took place. This demolition was carried out in order to allow for the enlargement of the factory. The mansion was then rebuilt in another location by the City of Legnano, using some original parts and earmarking it as the city's civic museum.

In 1936 a new thermoelectric power plant was inaugurated, which included three sets of alternators delivering a total output of 12,300 kW. In 1941 and 1943, however, two new dyeing halls were inaugurated, and in 1943 the mercerizing shed was finished. In August 1943 some British bombers headed for Milan accidentally hit Legnano causing about ten deaths: some bombs also ended up on the Cantoni Cotton Mill (two were found and detonated in 2008).

=== Post-World War II to 21st century ===
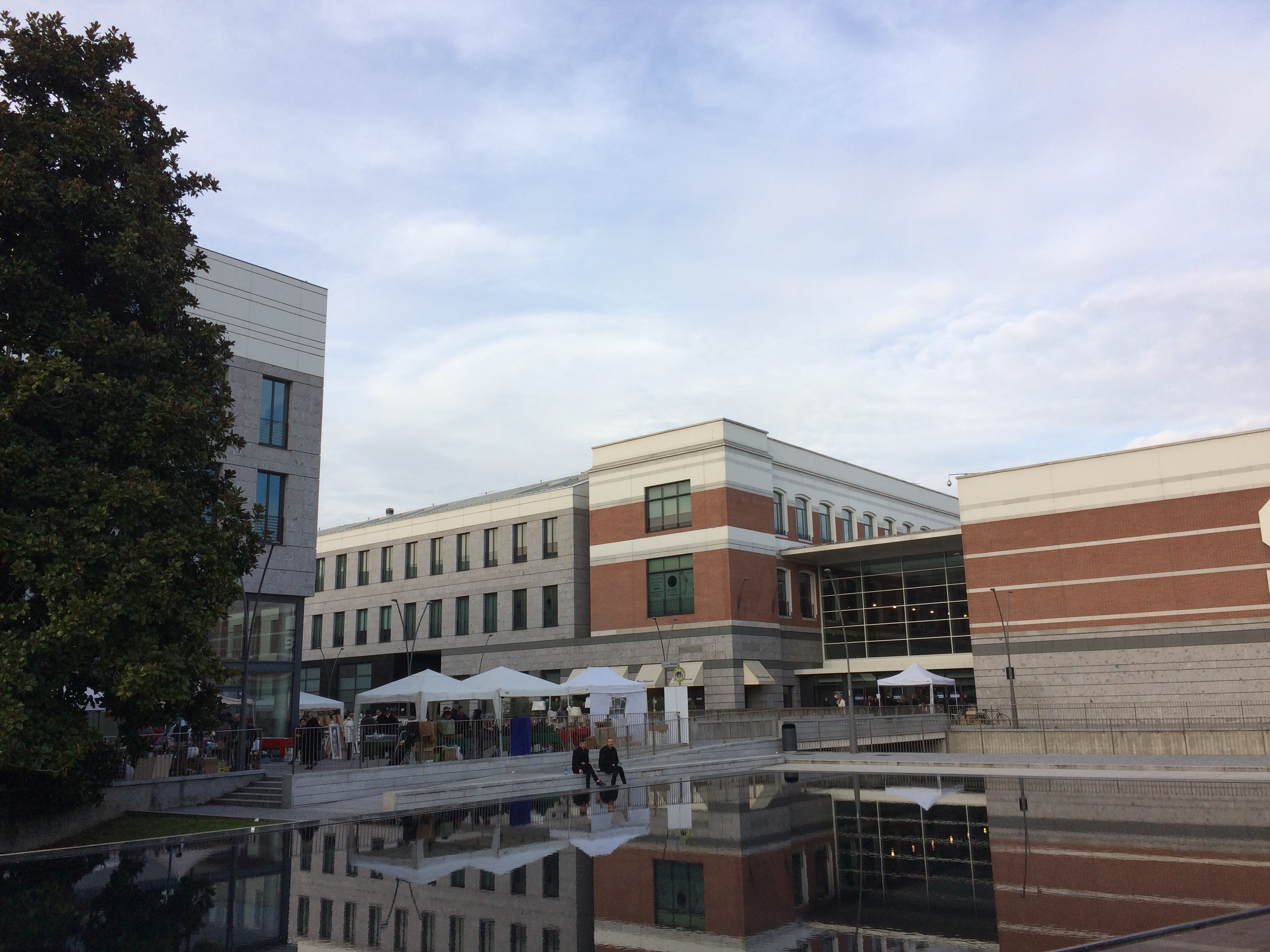
Legnano's “Gallerie Cantoni” shopping center

In the postwar period, the historic Legnano plant followed the company's fortunes. In 1984 Cantoni was purchased by Fabio Inghirami. The new owner closed the spinning department of the historic Legnano factory and attempted to direct production toward more sought-after fabrics. Despite this attempt to save the company, the Legnanese factory closed in 1985.

From that year, the former production site was abandoned and began to be occupied by illegal immigrants and drug dealers. Over the years, various recovery projects followed and eventually the pavilions were demolished in 2003 for the construction of a public park, a shopping center (the “Cantoni Galleries”) and a residential area. By order of the Soprintendenza ai Beni Culturali ed al Paesaggio of Milan, which intervened when the demolitions were almost over, the two most architecturally important facades (actually the only ones not yet demolished), those of the 1931 velvet department facing Corso Sempione, were preserved and are an integral part of the new commercial buildings. The rest of the complex, including other architecturally interesting buildings, was demolished.

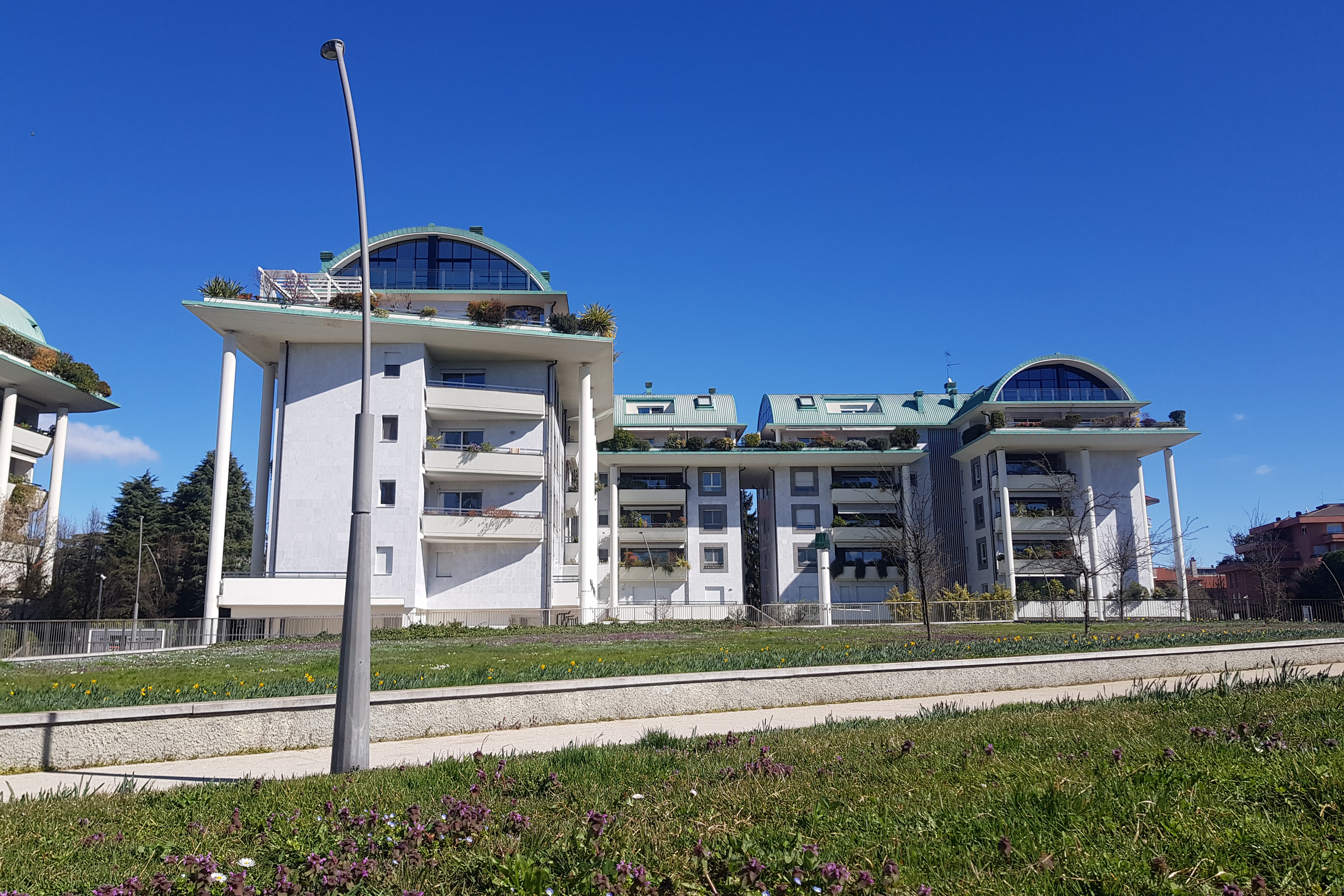
One of the residential buildings built after the Cantoni Area redevelopment

Between 1989 and 1991 a large area of the former Cantoni Cotton Mill in the municipality of Castellanza was redeveloped by the Union of Industrialists of the Province of Varese (UNIVA), designed by architect Aldo Rossi, creating the headquarters of Carlo Cattaneo University.

== See also ==
- Legnano
- Olona River
- Olona mills

== Bibliography ==
- Il Cotonificio Cantoni nella storia dell'industria cotoniera italiana [Cantoni cotton mill in the history of the Italian cotton industry] (in Italian). Vatican City: Tipografia Poliglotta Vaticana. 1972.
- D'Ilario, Giorgio (2003). Dizionario legnanese [Legnano Dictionary] (in Italian). Artigianservice.
- Ferrarini, Gabriella; Stadiotti, Marco (2001). Legnano. Una città, la sua storia, la sua anima [Legnano. A city, its history, its soul.] (in Italian). Telesio editore.
