= Olona mills =

Watermills on the Olona River, Italy

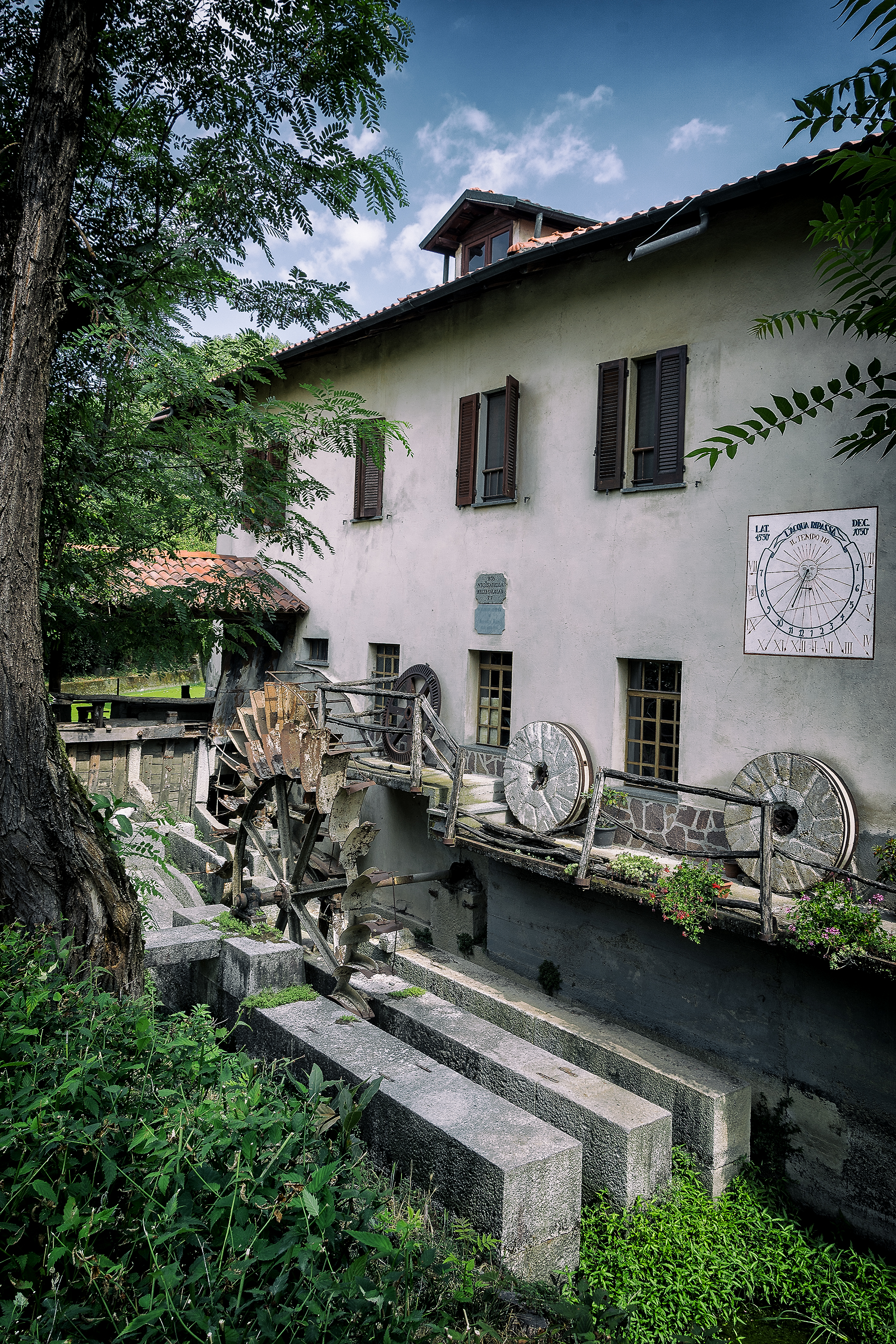
Glimpse of the Meraviglia mill in San Vittore Olona

The watermills on the Olona River are buildings used for milling activities that are scattered along the banks of the Olona River in the Lombardy region of Italy.

They reached their peak of development in the 17th century with the presence along the banks of the river of about a hundred milling plants. Thereafter, from the 18th to the 19th century, there was a phase of decline, which ended just after World War II, when there were only about ten active mills still present on the banks of the river. As the centuries passed, their number gradually decreased, and only a small number have survived until the 21st century. Some of them are in a state of abandonment, while others have been recovered for a wide variety of purposes.

The presence of the mills, the abundance of local labor, the existence of modern and relevant communication routes along the banks, the presence of local personalities who had substantial capital to invest, and the long tradition of craftsmanship in the Olona Valley allowed the river, which flows through the province of Varese and Milan, to become one of the cradles of Italian industrialization.

== History ==
=== Origins ===
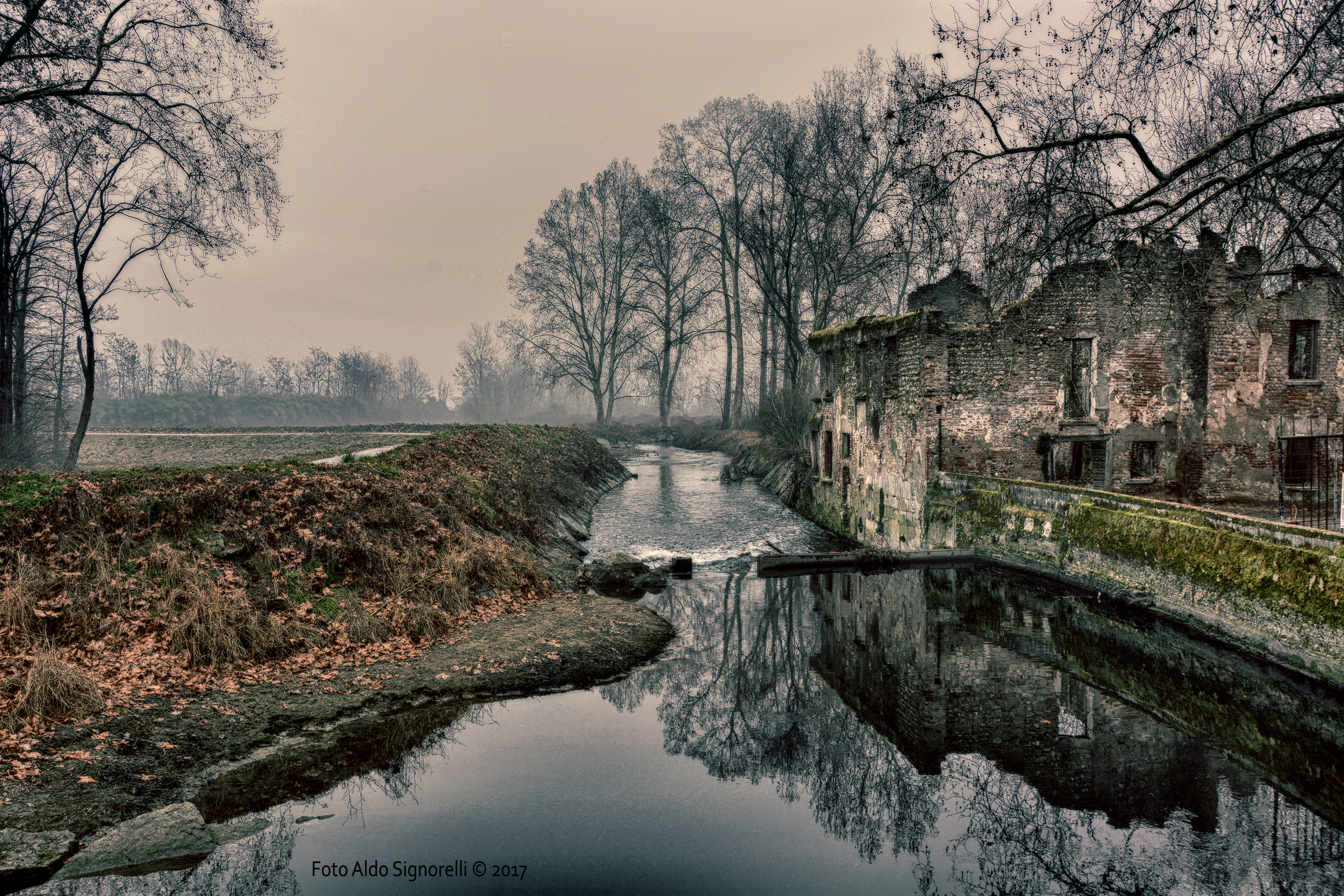
The remains of the Cornaggia mill in Legnano, which are located downstream from the Visconti Castle

Between the springs and Nerviano, the course of the river was once dotted with mills. Since the Middle Ages, milling activity thrived. Such was the number of mills that by the 15th century this activity was a significant economic source for the entire area. Ownership of the mills enabled the authorities to retain control over the surrounding territories. The latter, in fact, was linked to the supply of grain, by the millers of the Alto Milanese, to the city of Milan. Noble families of the time therefore tended to centralize mill properties in order to retain discretionary power over their use, especially in times of famine. This importance was such even in later centuries, and for this reason the Sforza and Visconti Seigniories placed a number of fortifications to garrison the most important groupings of mills on the Olona, taking advantage of existing forts and castles. The stretch of the river where most of the mills were located was between Legnano and Pogliano.

The oldest known document in which a mill on the Olona is mentioned is from 1043: it refers to a millstone owned by Pietro Vismara located in "Cogonzio" (a toponym that later disappeared), between the locality "Gabinella" in Legnano and Castegnate, near the church of San Bernardo. Other documents testifying to the presence of mills in Legnano are dated September 12, 1238 ("de subtus Legniano," meaning "south of Legnano") and 1261.

The once flourishing wine business in the Altomilanese area was put into crisis in the mid-19th century by a number of vine diseases. The first infection, pébrine, appeared between 1851 and 1852 and caused a rapid decline in the amount of wine produced in Lombardy: hectoliters of wine produced fell from 1,520,000 in 1838 to 550,000 in 1852. The final halt in wine production coincided with the outbreak, between 1879 and 1890, of two other vine diseases: downy mildew and phylloxera. Following these epidemics, wine cultivation in the entire Altomilanese disappeared, and farmers concentrated their efforts on the production of cereals and silkworms. In other wine-growing areas of Lombardy, the problem was solved by grafting species of vines that were immune to the disease (fox grape).

=== The decrees and regulations for water use ===
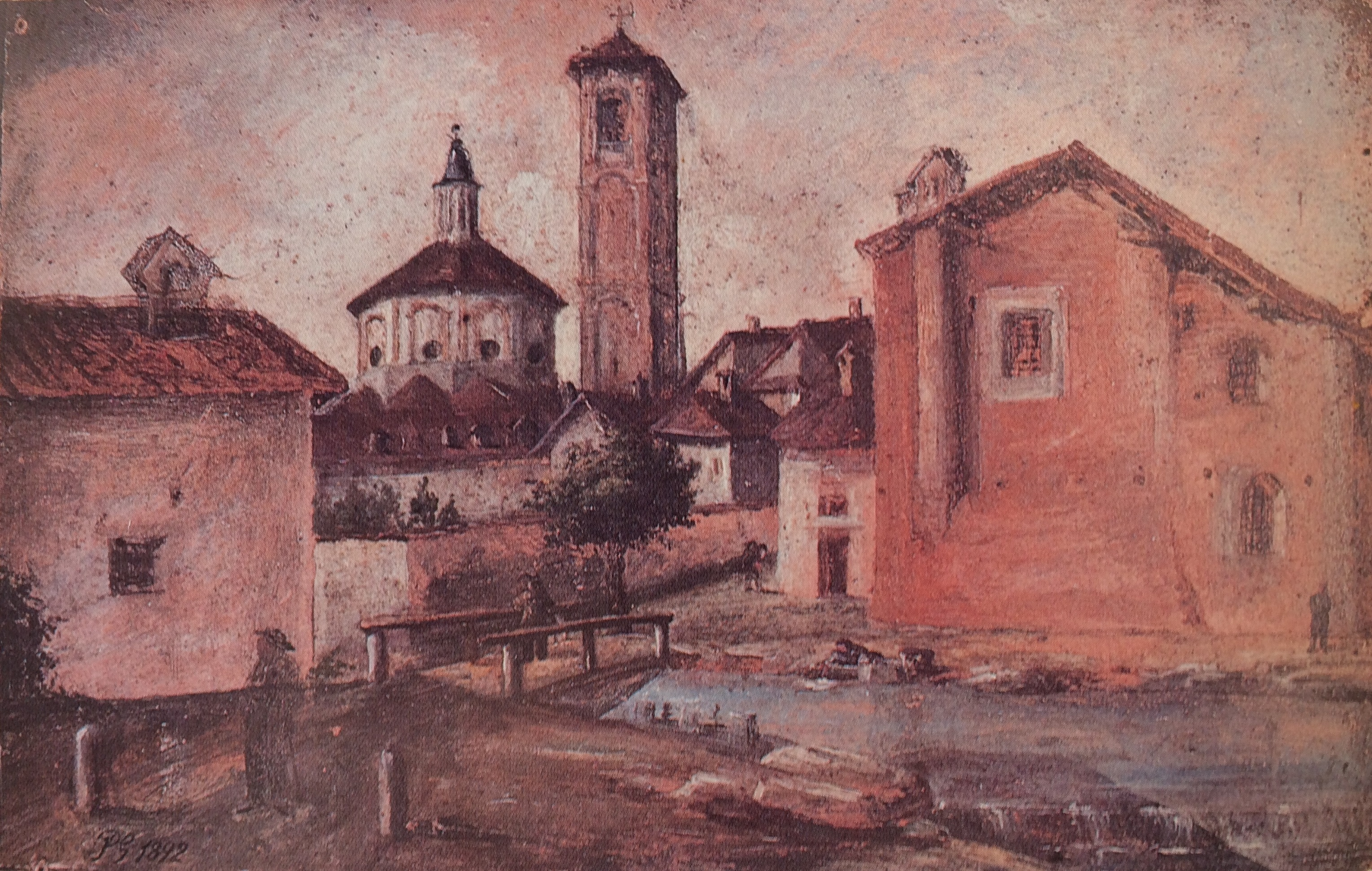
The Archbishop's Mill in Legnano in an 1849 watercolor by Giuseppe Pirovano

The intensive use of the waters of the Olona River by farmers, millers and artisans required the authorities to issue special regulations (the so-called "Statutes of the roads and waters of the contado of Milan"): this happened the first time in 1346 and then in 1396. These documents explained how the waters were to be exploited in irrigation and for their use as motive power to move the water wheels of mills. From this the importance that the authorities of the time attached to the function of mills can be deduced.

The preconditions for the establishment of a consortium among the river water users occurred in 1541, when the so-called Novae Costitutiones (in English, the "new constitutions") were signed. In this case, the new contract, which had a public character, provided for a Regius Judex Commissarius Fluminis Olona (in English, "river commissioner"), who supervised the control of the users of the waters of the Olona. Typically, this function was held by a member of the Senate of Milan. The Novae Costitutiones, and the offices associated with them, remained in effect until 1797.

In 1548, a proclamation was issued requiring water users to substantiate, through written documentation, the details of the various uses. Failure to comply with these regulations resulted in the payment of penalties, against which noble families were exempt. In these centuries the distribution of water was not equitable. The richest and most powerful users prevailed over the poorer and defenseless ones.

In 1606 a real consortium was established in Milan among the users under the supervision of the river commissioner. It was not a coincidence that the consortium was established in Milan: the water users who had the most conspicuous interests dwelt in the Milanese capital. This consortium association still survives under the name of the Olona River Consortium.

=== The censuses ===
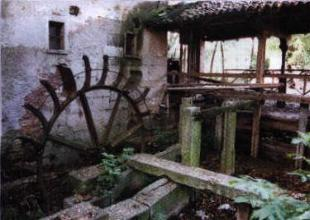
The Montoli mill in San Vittore Olona.

In 1606 the Royal Ducal Chamber of Milan commissioned some "ocular inspections" carried out by provincial engineers or guardians of the river, who were assigned to safeguard individual sections of the river. Engineer Pietro Antonio Barca surveyed 106 mills between the source of Rasa di Varese up to the city of Milan, of which 105 were used for grinding grain while the last one, located in Milan and owned by the Reverend Friars of San Vittore Olona, operated a trip hammer for the construction of arms and armor. The first censuses allowed, for the first time, a thorough survey of the mills along the river. It was in the government's interest to find abuses and waste perpetrated by users, and to determine precisely the fees they had to pay for drawing water.

In the 1606 inspection it was found that the Legnanese area was a suitable place for the construction of mills, since in this area the Olona River provided constant water for much of the year, and fast enough to move the large blades. Fourteen of them were in operation in this stretch of the river. In 1608, during a survey carried out by engineer Paolo Barca, it was found that there were 116 mills along the river with 463 water wheels serving these milling plants (called, in the Olona Valley, "rodigini"). Since there were 463 wheels in operation, it can be inferred from these figures that many mills had more than one wheel. Each of them could perform a different function. With Barca's report, the number of mills, wheels and owners were determined for the first time.

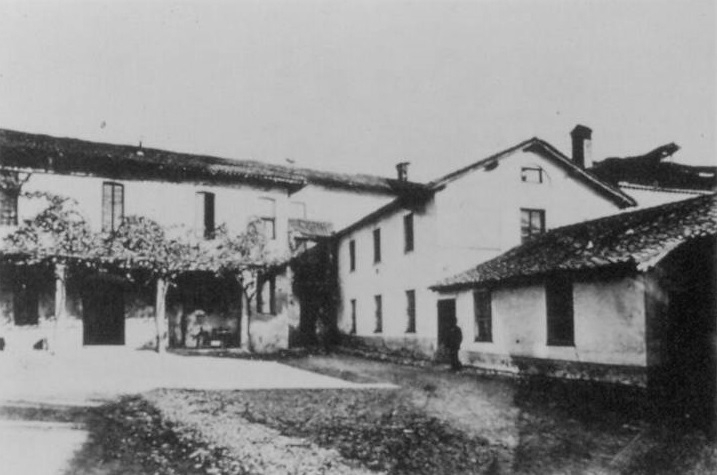
The Pomponio (or Prata) mill in Legnano in an 1881 image. It was purchased by the Cantoni Cotton Mill in 1829. It was located along the Olonella River at the height of the modern Piazza IV Novembre.

In 1733 a second census was taken. Made by the field warden Gaspare Bombelli, this document listed the mills and buildings along the course of the river. In 1772 a third census was taken, this time by surveyor Gabriele Verri and engineer Gaetano Raggi. By this time the number of mills had decreased from 116 to 106, with a total of 424 rodigini. These mills also moved a spinning wheel, two fulling mills, some oil presses, and a trip hammer. In the mentioned year in Legnano the mills had dwindled to 12, and among the owners were a large number of noble families, as well as the Policlinico of Milan and the Archbishop's Revenue of the Diocese of Milan. Starting in the 18th century, the distribution of properties also changed. Censuses of the eighteenth century showed that the properties associated with clergymen had decreased.

Until the 18th century, millers who worked in mills were generally not their owners as well. From the end of the mentioned century, millers began to buy the mills where they plied their trade.

A century later, the number of mills dropped again. In 1881, according to the report of engineer Luigi Mazzocchi, appointed engineer of Olona in 1880 by the river consortium, there were 55 mills, with a total of 170 wheels. This census shows that the owners of the mills no longer belonged to the aristocratic and ecclesiastical classes, but to the rising middle class.

=== Livellari and conduttori ===
The millers, that is, those who worked and dwelt with their families in the mills along the Olona River, were called "conduttori." The conduttori, in turn, received permission to settle in the mills from the so-called "livellari," that is, those who managed and controlled the milling facilities on behalf of the actual owners. Very often the livellari were the ones who worked in the mills without delegating this task to the conduttori. The management of the mills was feudal. The function of conduttore of the mill was hereditary, that is, it passed from father to son. In the absence of sons, the livellaro would choose a new conduttore.

The names of the mills hardly recalled the name of the owner. They were generally related to the names of the conduttori and livellari. For example, the Gadda mill in Fagnano Olona was known in this way by the last name of the livellaro and not by the Terzaghi counts, who were the owners.

At the turn of the 18th and 19th centuries this situation began to change. The livellari and conduttori, due to the money accumulated over the years and with the passing of generations, were able to purchase the mills from the historical owners.

=== Mills, artisans and industry ===
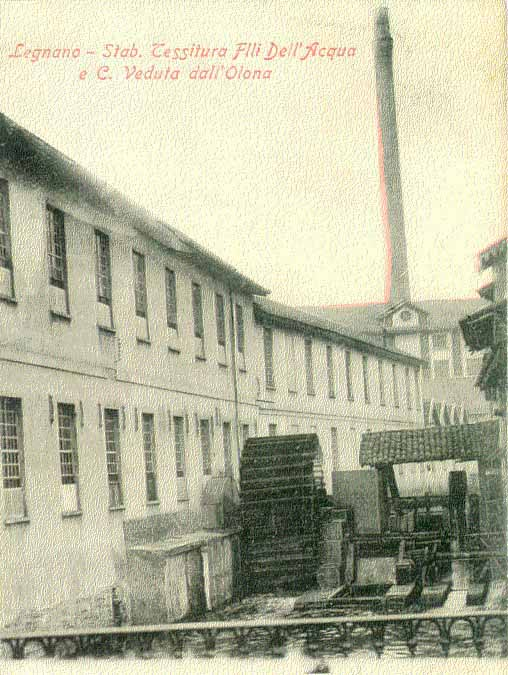
The Dell'Acqua cotton mill in Legnano, which arose along the Olona River.

The mills of the Olona River were not only used to grind grain, but also to produce seed oil, to husk rice, and to move the machinery of artisans. The wheels installed along the Olona operated the hammers for copper and iron working, sawmills (both marble and timber), and the tools of textile artisans. Along the banks of the river, hemp and linen cloth was retted, while woolen cloth underwent washing. Because of the deposits that settled at the bottom, activities related to the processing of flax and hemp were later banned.

Mills were key players in the first phase of the industrial revolution that involved the Olona Valley in the 19th century. After 1820, mills began to be used to move the machinery of the first factories that sprang up along the banks of the river. During the industrial development of the 19th and 20th centuries, many mills became part of the industrial establishments that were springing up along the Olona. Many pre-industrial activities that arose in the Olona Valley, and which were the nuclei of the future modern industrial establishments, were implanted along the banks of the river in order to allow the movement of the plants by exploiting the motive power of the waters. This motive power was originated through the modification and expansion of mills originally intended for grinding agricultural products. Industrialization of the banks of the Olona was thus gradual, with entrepreneurs preferring to exploit the hydraulic systems of the old mills rather than implant new ones. In other words, industry was born as a metamorphosis of part of the old mills, which were first transformed into protoindustries and then into real industrial activities. As a consequence, the greatest concentration of pre-industrial activities occurred at the stretches of the river where there was a greater presence of milling plants.

The advent of industry was the natural consequence of a process that, over time, saw the river play a pivotal role in economic activities. The spirit of initiative and the presence of mills triggered a major industrial phenomenon. Many industrial pioneers made the area one of Italy's most important textile industrial centers in the 19th century, incorporating several mills within their factories. In the early 19th century, large belts were attached to the water-driven paddles that moved textile looms, machine tools, hammers, and even the facilities of a brewery. During the 19th century entrepreneurs competed to take over the old mills. Many millers rejected the offers, but others surrendered their businesses to the nascent industries.

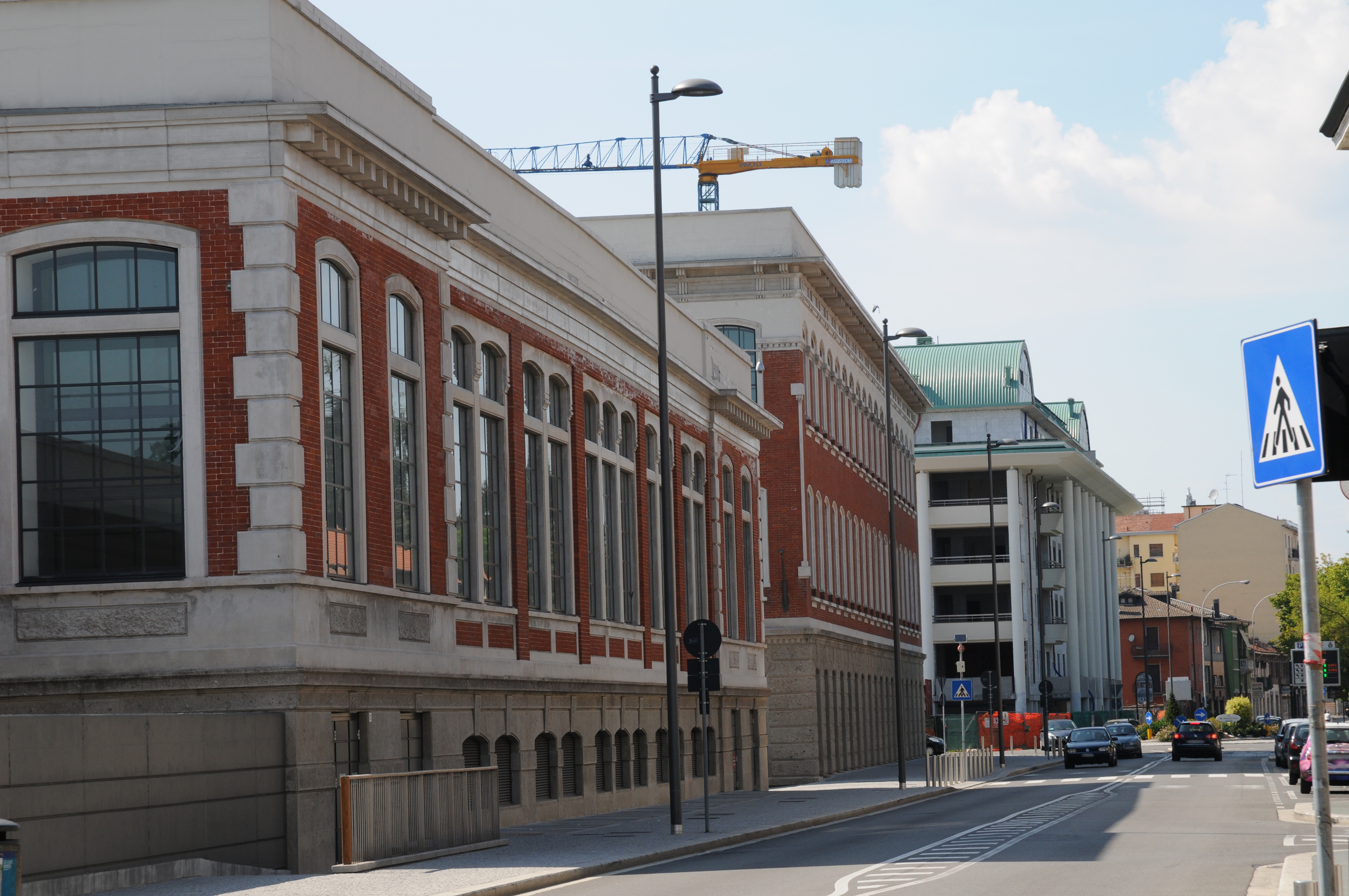
On the left, the restored facades of the warehouses of the former Cantoni Cotton Mill in Legnano. They are the only surviving part of the production complex

An example of a company that arose along the Olona and originally exploited the motive power of the river was the Cantoni cotton mill. Also in this case the spinning activity used the existing grain mills on the river, which had been suitably adapted. First Camillo Borgomanero (founder of the first production nucleus of the cotton mill), and then Costanzo Cantoni, purchased two milling plants: the Isacco mill (formerly owned by the Lampugnani family, and purchased in 1819) and the Cornaggia-Medici mill (1841). The latter mill was very old, having belonged to the Melzi family since 1162. In a document dated March 27, 1847, one can read: "[...] Mr. Cantoni, Owner of two united mills placed on the Olona, the first one known as the Pomponio on the map at No. 1632. It was sold by the noble Mr. Marquis Cornaggia, sold in the year 1831 to the firm Bazzoni & Sperati, and then in 1841 purchased by Mr. Cantoni [...]".

In 1881 there were 55 mills surveyed and some of them had changed their initial activity. In Induno Olona some mills operated a millstone and oil press, a tannery for hides and a silk press. In the Varese area, there were fourteen mills and for three of these there were associated two paper mills and a silk press. Along the course of the river in the Olona valley, Engineer Mazzocchi noticed in the mills many oil presses, paper mills and numerous spinning, weaving and dyeing mills. For example, in Legnano, out of 11 mills surveyed, in four the traditional grinding of grain was still being carried on (specifically, in the Gabinella, Contess, Castello, and Melzi mills), while in the others the function had changed, having been incorporated into the industrial plants. The mills that still grinded grain and had not been incorporated into industries were then gradually made obsolete by the new grinding techniques.

Many of them were later abandoned or demolished by the industries in order to allow the installation of the more modern and efficient water turbines. The purpose of the acquisition of the mills and the subsequent installation of water wheels was to move the machinery of the textile, mechanical, tanning, and paper industries, as well as the plants of the dyeing, bleaching, and hydroelectric power plants. As for the latter, two hydroelectric power plants were operating along the Olona River in 1920. Ten companies that arose along the Olona also owned small hydroelectric power plants to serve their factories.

Then, with the appearance of steam engines and electric engines at the turn of the 19th and 20th centuries, the energy to move machinery no longer came solely from the Olona, so water wheels were gradually abandoned. In Legnano, the seven mills in the city center were demolished by the large cotton industries to allow the installation of the more modern and efficient water wheels. In the post-war period, due to the nefarious consequences of the conflict, the need for electricity grew, and the use of the old mill wheels became economically viable again, even if only for small workshops. The old mills thus resumed operating drills, planers, emery wheels, etc., but even this new revival soon died out as economic conditions changed.

=== Mills in the 21st century ===
After a very long service rendered mainly to agriculture, many of the old mills have disappeared, victims of the progress of technology and new milling techniques, as well as the emergence of the first industrial settlements. By the 21st century, little has remained of the mill-studded riverside landscape that characterized the banks of the Olona River in past centuries.

== Chronology concerning the mills on the Olona River ==
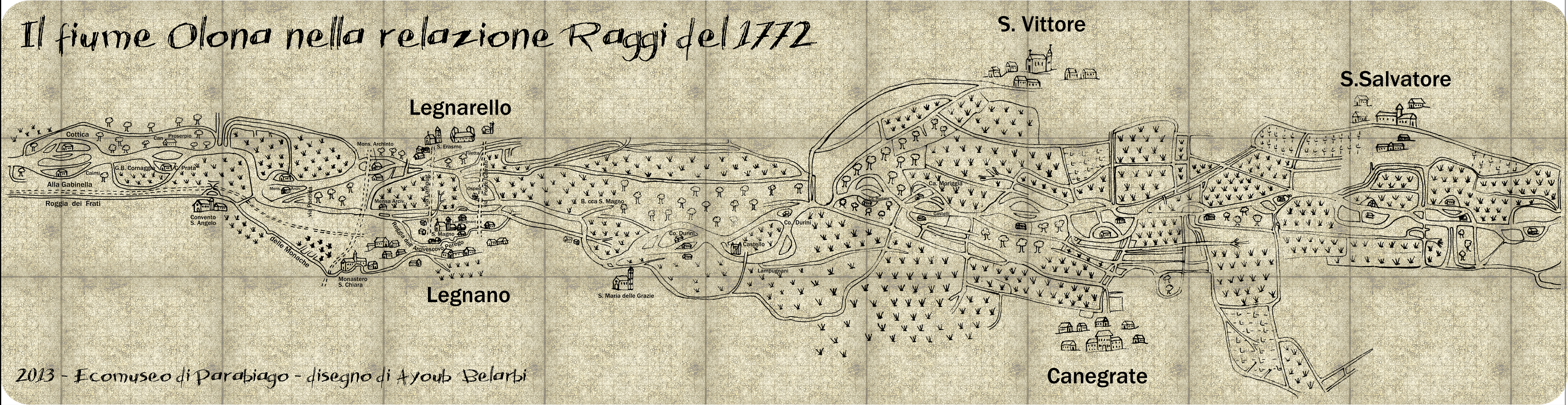
Map by engineer Gaetano Raggi of the Olona River Consortium, showing the territory from Legnano to Parabiago (1772)

This is the chronology of the most important events related to water mills on the Olona River:

- 1043: a mill on the Olona River is first mentioned in "Cogonzio," a rione of Castellanza (a toponym that later disappeared).
- 1174: during his fifth descent into Italy, Frederick Barbarossa destroyed many mills to weaken the resistance of the Lombard League.
- c. 1200: Some documents indicate that a mill near what is now Legnano Castle was entrusted to monks who were followers of the rule of St. Augustine. On the convent of these monks, which was later abandoned, the castle of Legnano was built.
- 1339: on a frosty February morning, in the mill area, with the fields covered in snow, the famous battle of Parabiago was fought between Luchino and Lodrisio Visconti, which saw 4,000 infantrymen die in a single day.
- 1510: the Swiss army from Ticino, descending towards Milan, destroyed most of the mills in the Olona valley.
- 1594: Legnano's mills were surveyed and classified into five categories, corresponding to five sections of the river. In the Legnano district of Gabinella there were five mills, at Mugiato two milling plants, near Piazza San Magno five mills, at Legnanello one milling plant and near the castle two mills.
- 1606: In engineer Barca's report the locations where the mills stood are not indicated, but only the names of the owners are present. Among them were mentioned the Lampugnani, the Cusani and the Salmoiraghi. From Varese to Milan there were 106 mills and among them were two hammers and a fulling mill.
- 1772: From Raggi's report, there were 28 buildings in the area now covered by the Mills Park for milling activities. The surnames of the millers were also noted in this document: Cozzi, Montoli, Salmoiraghi and Rossetti. From the source to Milan, the total number of mills surveyed was 106.
- 1881: A "Note of industries on the Olona River" was compiled by engineer Luigi Mazzocchi. Scrolling through that note, a total of 55 mills were found from Varese to Milan. Moreover, the new function, at the service of Lombardy's nascent industry, of the old water mills could be seen. In Legnano four cotton spinning mills were surveyed, in San Vittore Olona two mills also for cotton, in Canegrate three mills for grinding wheat, in Parabiago five milling plants for crushing it, and in Nerviano three wheat mills.

== The mills present along the Olona River ==
=== Province of Varese ===
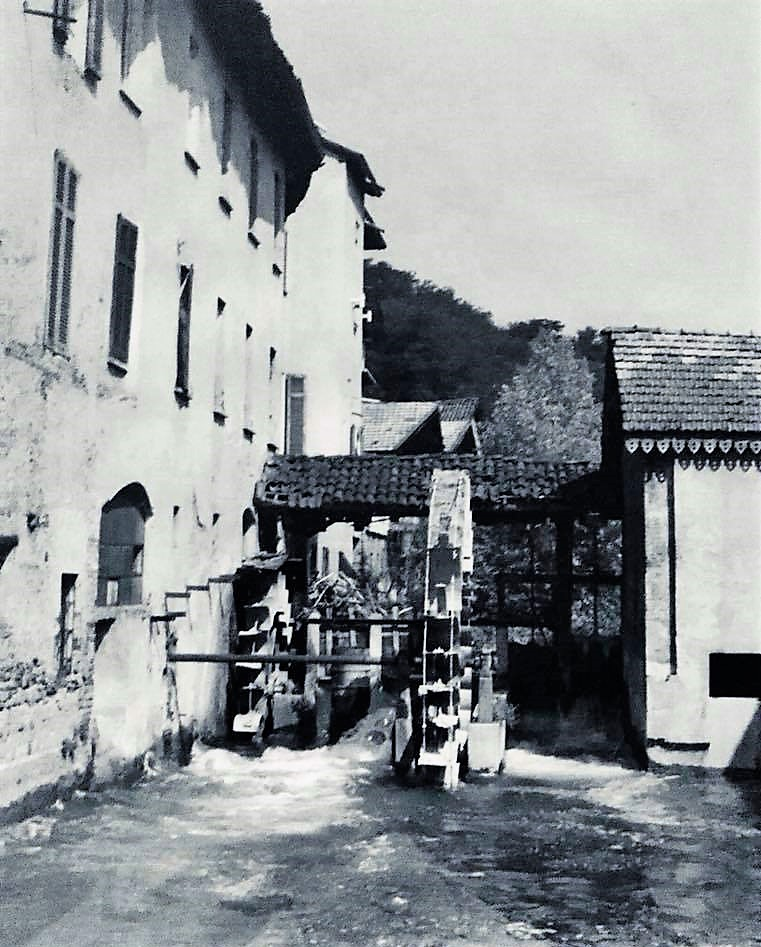
The Sasso mill in Olgiate Olona in the 1960s

Starting from the headwaters, the first historically significant milling plants encountered along the Olona are the Grassi mills in Varese, which were built between the 16th and 19th centuries. They were renovated for use as housing and have, on the exterior walls, some examples of sundials of great historical interest and a valuable fresco from 1675. Further south are the Sonzini mills in Gurone, which predate 1772 and were used for housing. They remained in operation until 1970. In Vedano Olona is located the Fontanelle mill. Already present in 1772, it possessed a grain mill and a press. It suffered initial abandonment in the 1920s, then was renovated in the 1970s and again abandoned in the following decade.

In Castellazzo, a locality of Fagnano Olona, is located the Bosetti mill. Already surveyed as a Visconti mill in 1772, it was catalogued as a Ponte mill in 1857 before taking the name of Bosetti mill in the following years. In 1982 only the dwellings were accessible, while the rest is abandoned. In Castelseprio there is the Zacchetto mill, which was active for agricultural purposes from the 18th to the 19th century. It first became the headquarters of the Pagani company (1920s), and then was converted into a power plant. Since the 1980s it has been abandoned. In Gornate Superiore, a hamlet of Castiglione Olona, is located the Celeste mill. Formerly a Mariani mill in 1772 and a Guidali mill in 1857, it was registered under its present name in 1881. It had oil presses and a grain mill. Since 1930 it has been adapted to private housing. In Lonate Ceppino is located the Taglioretti mill. It, too, was owned by Mariani in 1722. It took the name Taglioretti mill in the 19th century. It served the Canziani paper mill from 1901 and the Samec paper mill from 1920. In 1982 it was reported to be abandoned. Gornate Olona is home to the Torba and San Pancrazio mills. Both existing before 1772, they assumed the names of their respective hamlets in 1857. They ceased milling activities in the mid-20th century. They are largely used for housing purposes. In Olgiate Olona is located the Sasso mill. It is well preserved and therefore a project is underway to completely restore the hydraulic system.

=== Province of Milan ===
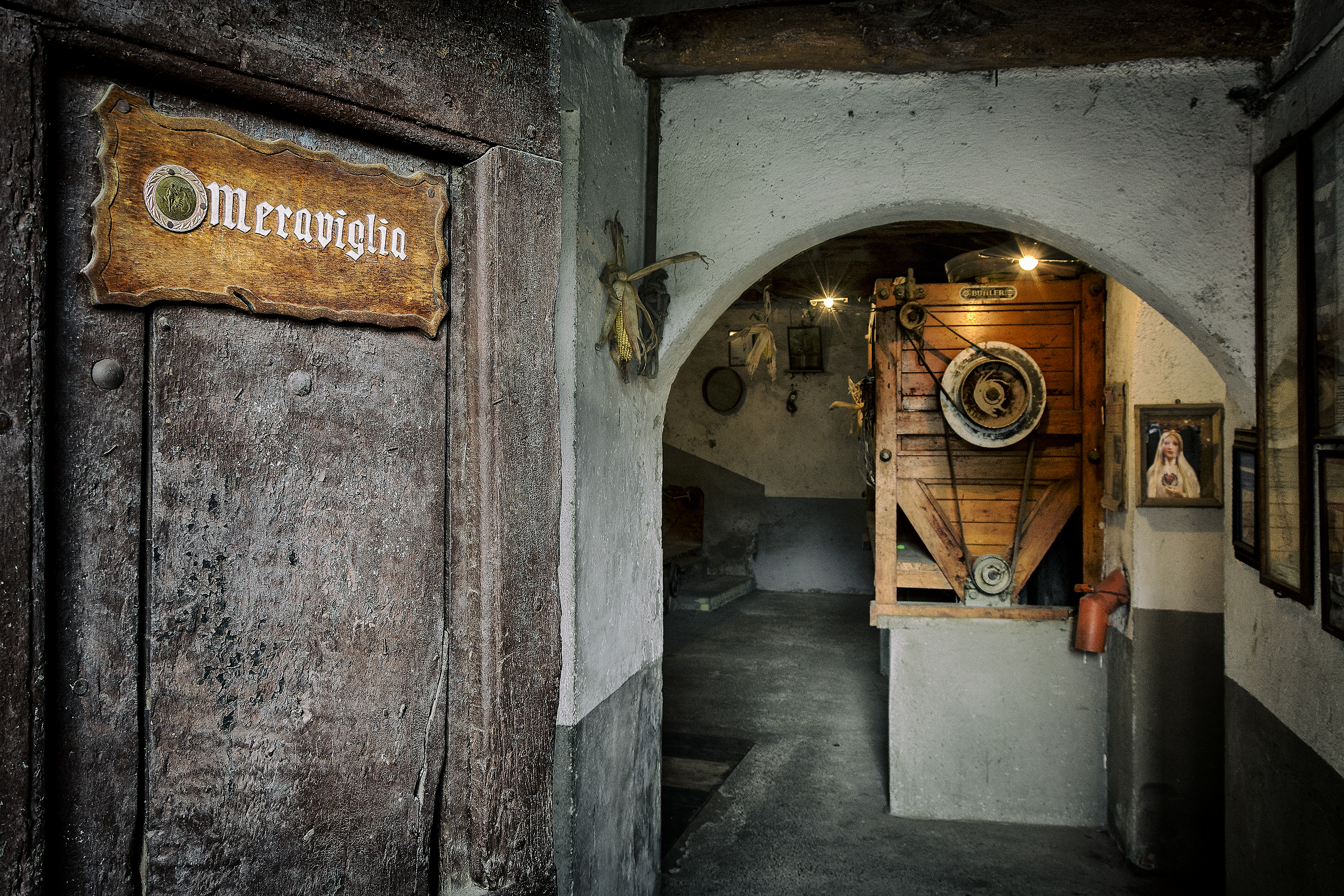
Interior of the Meraviglia mill in San Vittore Olona

In 1772, according to Raggi's report, there were 10 mills surveyed in Legnano, while in Legnanello there were two buildings used for milling activities. In 1881, according to engineer Mazzocchi's report, only five mills were surveyed in Legnano. Only the ruins of the mill named "Sotto il Castello" or Cornaggia have reached the 21st century. Located in Via Molini, on the Olona Island where Legnano Castle stands, it dates back to the first half of the 16th century. The mill is in ruins and has obvious structural collapse and widespread deterioration. No building work has been carried out, and the structure is completely disused. It is publicly owned and there are plans to reuse the building with establishment of service functions to the adjacent park: bar, offices for volunteers and green maintenance workers, warehouses and storage, and locker rooms. Memories of the Bianchi mill have also come down to the 21st century in Legnano.

Also according to the Raggi report, there were five mills surveyed in the locality of San Vittore Olona, while in 1881, based on the report of engineer Mazzocchi, there were three milling plants. In San Vittore Olona there is the Melzi-Salazar mill. Located on Valloggia Street, it dates to the first half of the 13th century, and is in a fair state, as it still retains the original structure that is still recognizable. This mill still retains the blades, although they are no longer functional. In the decades prior to the 21st century, no building work was implemented, and it is privately owned. This milling facility is used for agricultural activities and residential use. Also located in San Vittore Olona is the Cozzi mill. It is located at Via Magenta, and is presumed to date back to the 15th century. It is in a good state of preservation. Part of the structure has been completely renovated, although the blades have been preserved, while the barn has retained its original features. The milling facility has been renovated and has been used for residential and agricultural purposes. It is privately owned. The Meraviglia mill, on the other hand, is located on Valloggia Street; it is presumed to date back to 1230. It is in a good state of preservation, as it shows no obvious signs of deterioration. The blades are in good condition and are in working order. Simple routine maintenance has been implemented, and it is privately owned. This milling facility is used as a residence and for agricultural activities. The De Toffol mill, which is the oldest milling plant to have still functioning blades, dates back to the 14th century. Memories of the Moriggia mill have also come down to the 21st century in the mentioned municipality. This milling facility predates 1717, the year in which the Marquises Castelli and Moriggia, nobles of Canegrate and Parabiago, obtained permission from the Olona River Consortium to rebuild the weir. In 1733 the facilities were operated by millers Giuseppe Montoli and Carlo Angelo Montoli, respectively. By 1802 the Castelli mill had passed to the Visconti Vimodrone property. In 1839 a cotton spinning mill (with a water wheel) was operating in place of the Visconti Vimodrone mill, which in 1900 had 212 mechanical looms.

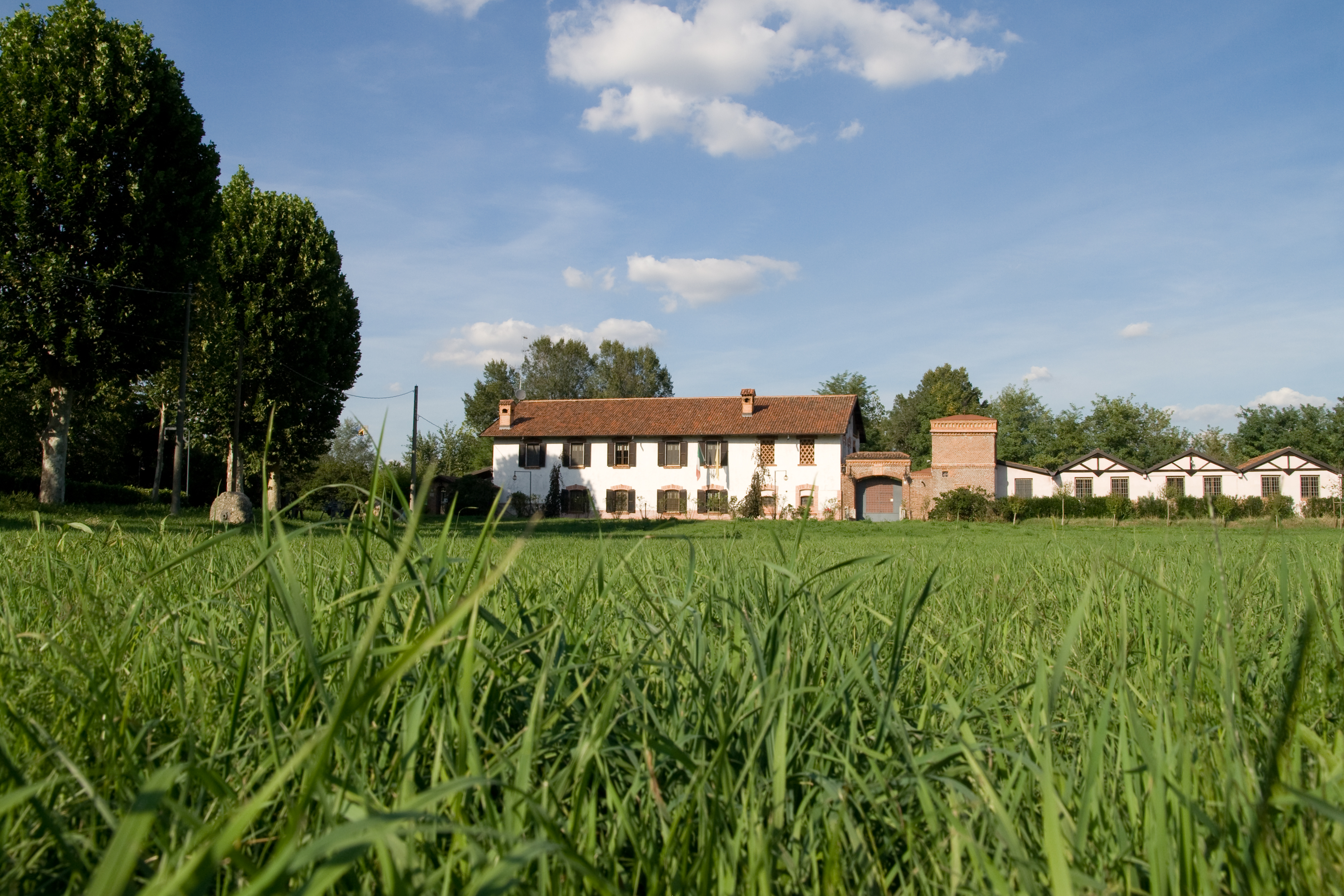
The Gajo-Lampugnani mill in Parabiago

In 1772, according to the Raggi report, three milling plants were surveyed in the locality of Canegrate, a number that was confirmed in 1881 by the report of engineer Mazzocchi. Canegrate is home to the Galletto or Agrati mill, which is the best preserved. Located on Via Mulino Galletto, it is presumed to date back to 1570. It is in good condition, although it has lost its function as a mill, as it has been used as a pizzeria-brewery. It is privately owned. The Giulini mill, dating from the 17th century, has an irrigation ditch as the only evidence of its past function, but it has long been without water. The Bersoldo-Montoli mill, which is privately owned, dates back to the 16th century. It is located on Cascinette Street.

Also according to the same report, five milling plants were surveyed in the locality of Parabiago, a number that was confirmed in 1881 by the report of engineer Mazzocchi. Parabiago is home to the Rancilio mill. Located on Resegone Street, it is presumed to date back to the 17th century. It is in a fair state, although subsequent interventions have substantially altered its appearance (it has taken on the appearance of a farmstead rather than a mill). A comprehensive renovation has been carried out, it is privately owned, and the building is intended for residential and agricultural use. On the small island of Resegone Street, there are remains of the Corvini mill. The Moroni or Bert mill is located on Union Street, and is presumed to date from the 17th century. It is in good overall condition. However, the milling plant is inactive, and of the three wheels, only one remains. The property is privately owned, and the building is intended for residential and agricultural use. Also located in Parabiago is the Gajo-Lampugnani mill, which is the best preserved.

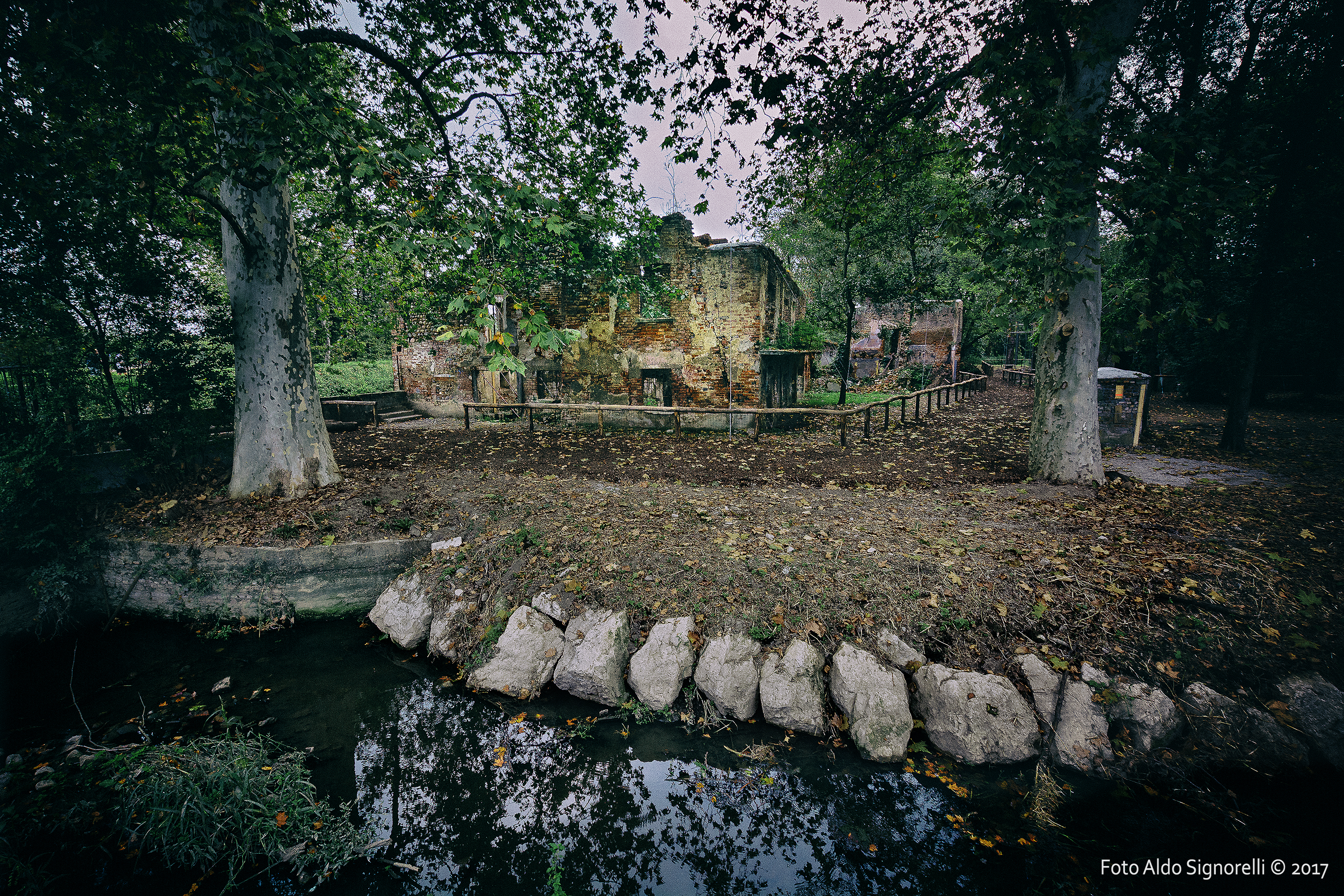
Glimpse of the Cornaggia mill in Legnano

In 1772, according to the Raggi report, five milling plants were surveyed in the locality of Nerviano, a number that dropped to three in engineer Luigi Mazzocchi's report of 1881. In Nerviano there is the Star Qua mill, which is located on the border with Parabiago. The time of construction of this milling plant is unknown. It is in a fair general condition, and retains its original characteristics. A renovation has been carried out. However, it retains the irrigation ditch and the wheels, which date back to 1885. It is privately owned and the building is used for residential and agricultural purposes. The mill's name "Star Qua" is due to a story concerning an incident in 1853; to an order to vacate the premises by Habsburg army troops, the miller replied, "we want to stay here!". Nerviano is also home to the Lombardi mill and the Arese mill.

Downstream from Nerviano, the Sant'Elena mill in Pregnana Milanese can still be found, while in Rho the Provostal mill, once owned by the San Vittore Parish and now completely abandoned, is followed further downstream by the Cecchetti mill, transformed into a dwelling, although it has preserved some elements of the machinery on display in the garden, as well as the Nuovo mill, located near the confluence with the Bozzente stream and also becoming a private residence.

Within the territory of the municipality of Milan, the only example that has survived to the present day is the Molino Dorino, located in the immediate vicinity of the station of the same name on Metro Line 1. This plant was fed by spring water from the Cagnola fountain, just before its confluence with the Olona, which today flows in this section culverted.

== The Five Mills ==
From the mills along the Olona River takes its name a traditional cross-country race, the Cinque Mulini, which is run every year in the spring in San Vittore Olona. In 1953 it became an international competition. It is included in the World Cross Challenge circuit, which is the IAAF international grouping of the most important cross-country races in the world.

== See also ==
- Olona
- Cinque Mulini

== Bibliography ==
- PLIS (2012). Parco dei mulini, indagine conoscitiva finalizzata alla redazione del piano del parco.
- Carnelli, Luigi (2006). Il fiume Olona. Le acque, la storia, i mulini.
- D'Ilario, Giorgio; Gianazza, Egidio; Marinoni, Augusto; Turri, Marco (1984). Profilo storico della città di Legnano. Edizioni Landoni.
- Agrati, Giacomo (1982). I Mulini "sotto al castello". La Tipotecnica.
- Macchione, Pietro; Mauro Gavinelli (1998). Olona. Il fiume, la civiltà, il lavoro. Varese: Macchione Editore.
- Di Maio, Paola (1998). Lungo il fiume. Terre e genti nell'antica valle dell'Olona. Corsico: Teograf.
- Agnoletto, Attilio (1992). San Giorgio su Legnano - storia, società, ambiente.
- Renata Castelli, I mulini da grano, in AA.VV., La fabbrica ritrovata. Archeologia industriale nella Valle Olona, Varese, 1989
- Autori vari (2015). Il Palio di Legnano : Sagra del Carroccio e Palio delle Contrade nella storia e nella vita della città. Banca di Legnano.
