= Fial =

Italian engine manufacturer

Fabbrica Italiana Automobili Legnano
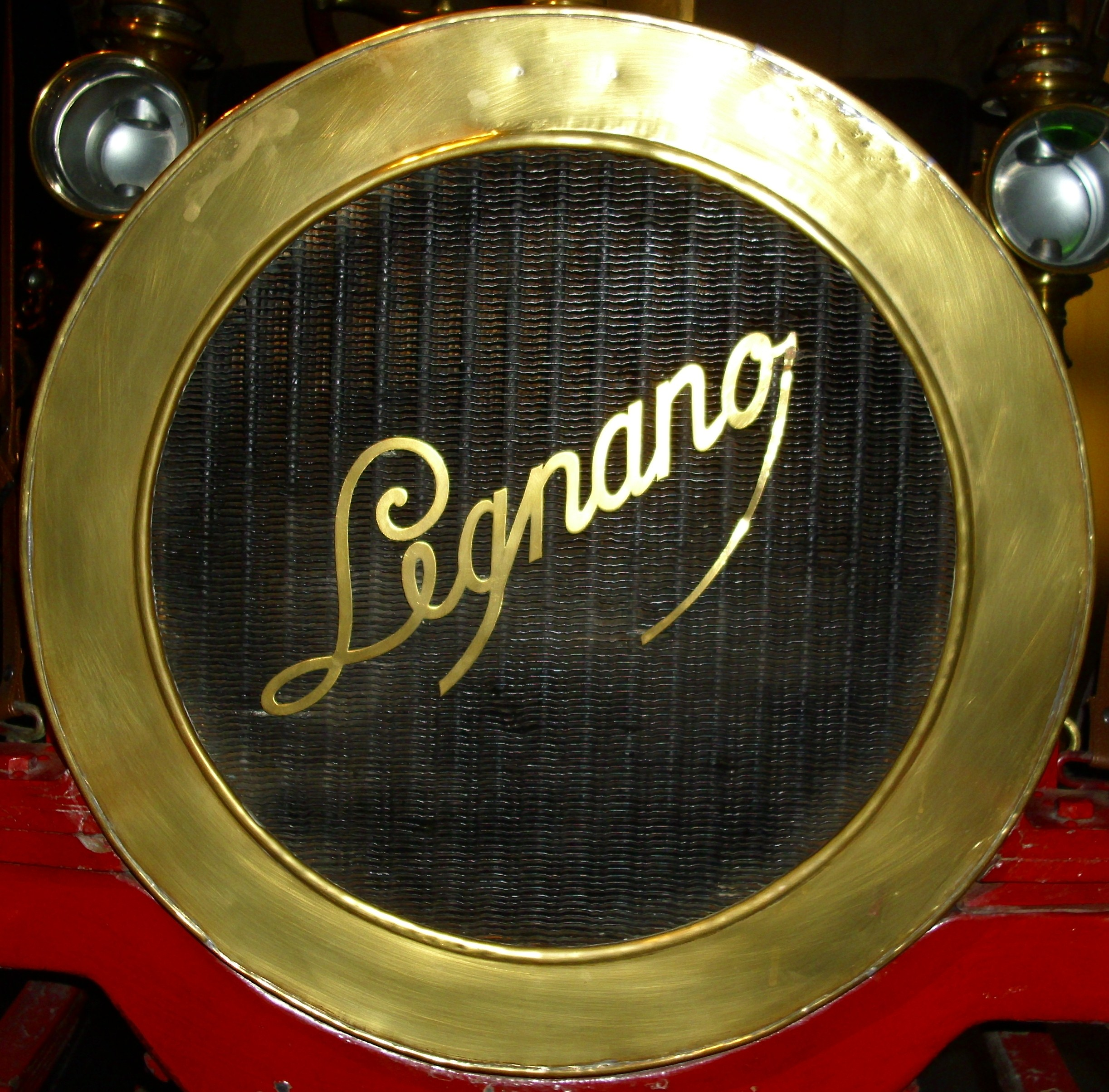
- Industry: Automotive
- Founded: 1906
- Defunct: 1909
- Fate: taken over by Rosa & Ferrario
- Headquarters: Legnano, Italy
- Products: Automobiles

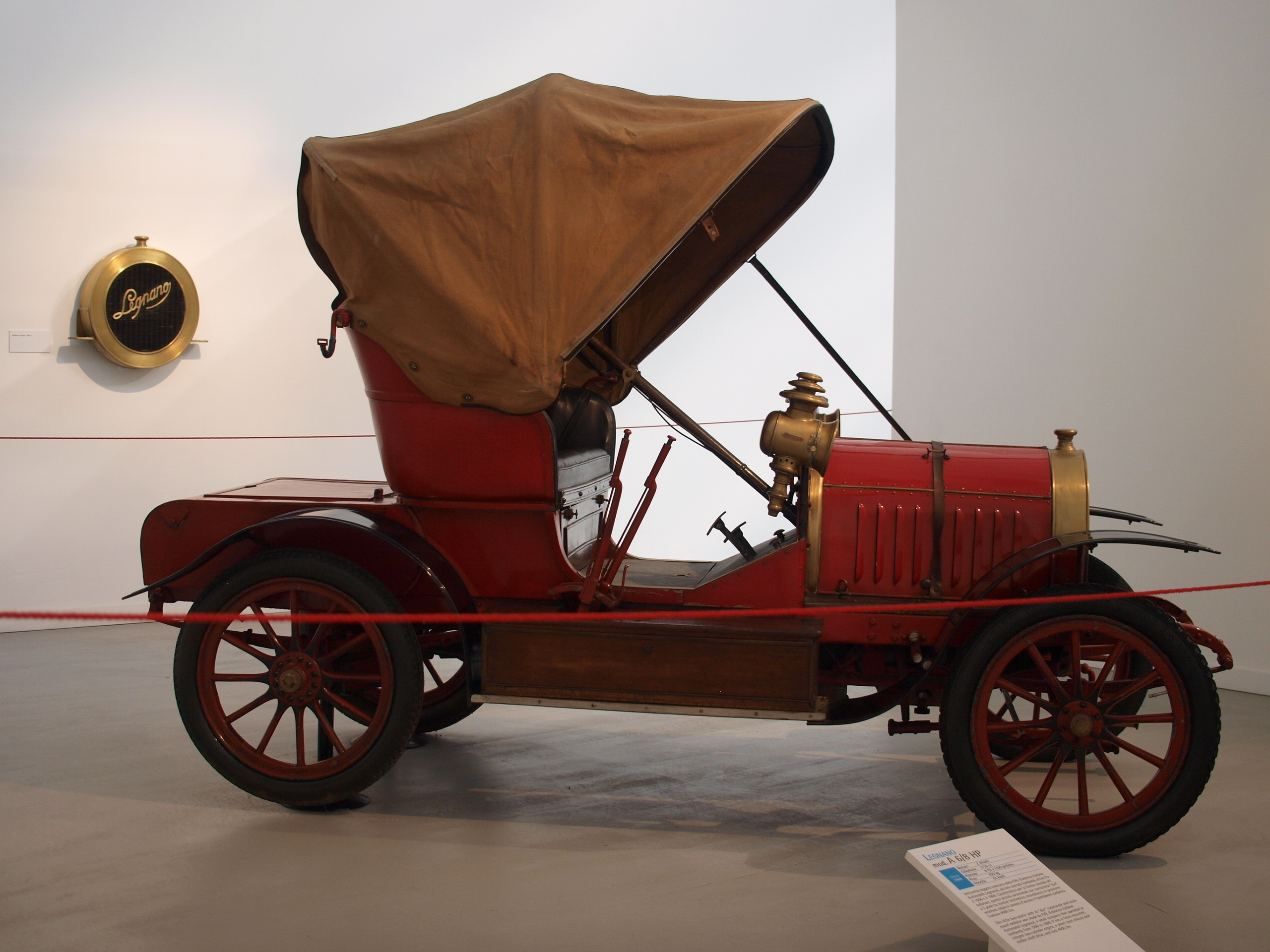
Legnano A 6/8 HP

Fial (Fabbrica Italiana Automobili Legnano), direct translation Italian Automobile Factory Legnano, was a company that manufactured industrial and marine engines in Legnano. It was a part of Ghioldi Mechanical Workshops (Officine Meccaniche Ghioldi), which was founded by automotive pioneer Guglielmo Ghioldi in 1898 in Canegrate; the company moved to Legnano in 1902. In 1906 it entered the automobile business and manufactured one car, the Legnano Type A 6/8 HP. The car had a two-cylinder 1135 cc engine. Two years later, in 1908, the company was placed in liquidation after filing for bankruptcy. In 1909 the company was taken over by Rosa & Ferrario and car production ended. The 6/8 model was the only model they ever produced. The Legnano is at display on Museo Nazionale dell'Automobile in Turin.
