= San Vittore Olona =

- Comune
- Comune di San Vittore Olona
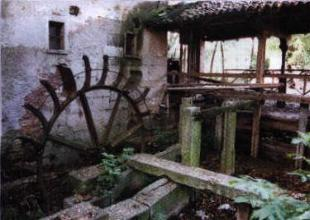
- A water mill in San Vittore Olona.

- Coat of arms

- Location within Italy Location within Lombardy
- Coordinates: 45°35′N 8°56′E
- Country: Italy
- Region: Lombardy
- Metropolitan city: Milan (MI)

Government
  - Mayor: Daniela Rossi

Area
  - Total: 3.4 km^{2} (1.3 sq mi)
- Elevation: 197 m (646 ft)

Population (31 December 2021)
  - Total: 8,283
  - Density: 2,400/km^{2} (6,300/sq mi)
- Demonym: Sanvittoresi
- Time zone: UTC+1 (CET)
  - Summer (DST): UTC+2 (CEST)
- Postal code: 20028
- Dialing code: 0331
- Patron saint: St. Victor
- Saint day: 8 May
- Website: Official website

San Vittore Olona (Legnanese: San Vittor [ˌsãː ʋiˈtuːr]) is a comune (municipality) in the Province of Milan in the Italian region Lombardy, located on the river Olona and about 20 kilometres (12 mi) northwest of Milan.

Since 1933, the comune has been host to the Cinque Mulini cross country running race. The race runs through five of the town's water mills, and some of the world's most distinguished runners have competed there, including Haile Gebrselassie, Sebastian Coe, and Kenenisa Bekele.

San Vittore Olona borders the municipalities of Legnano, Cerro Maggiore, Canegrate, and Parabiago.

== See also ==
- Olona mills
