= Nerviano =

Municipality in Lombardy, Italy

- Comune
- Comune di Nerviano
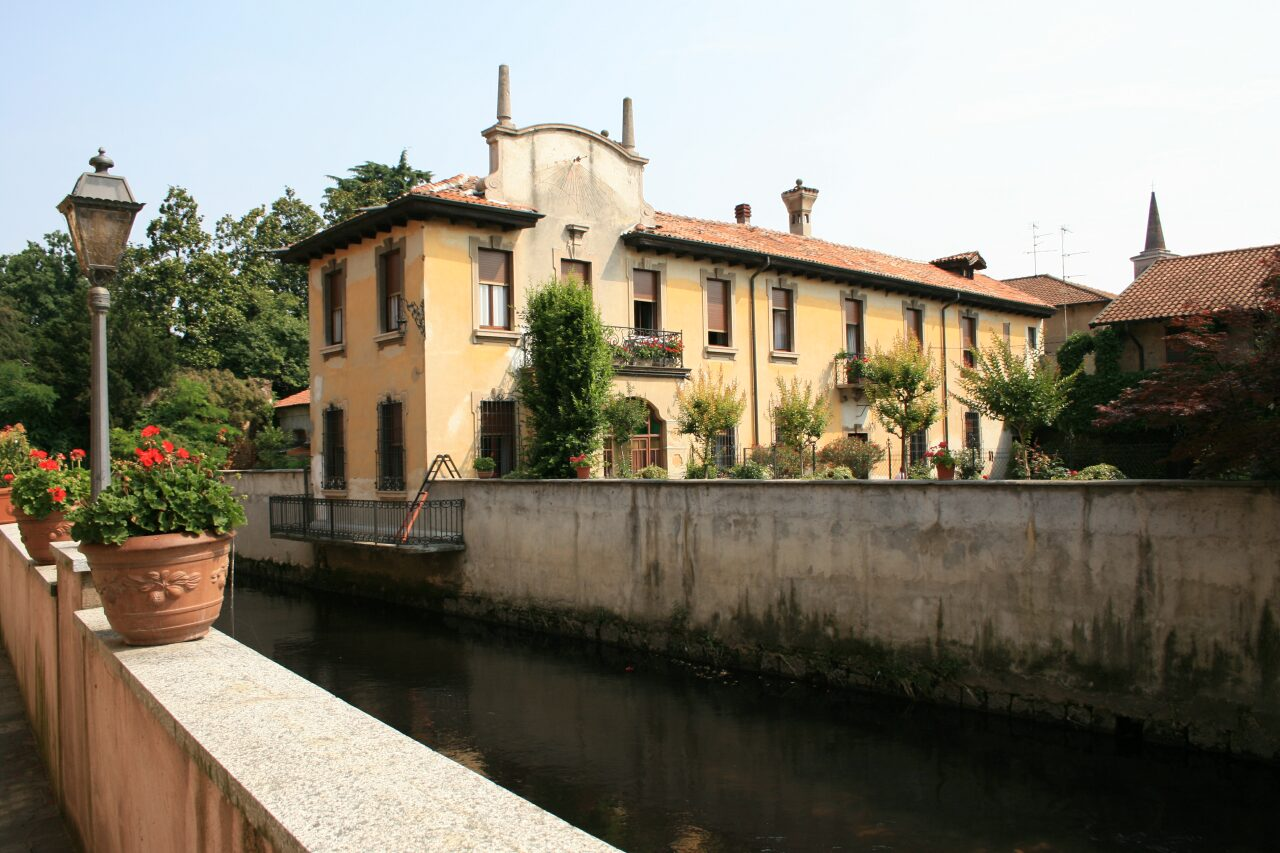

- Coat of arms

- Location within Italy Location within Lombardy
- Coordinates: 45°33′N 8°59′E
- Country: Italy
- Region: Lombardy
- Metropolitan city: Milan (MI)
- Frazioni: Cantone, Costa San Lorenzo, Garbatola, Sant'Ilario, Villanova

Government
  - Mayor: Massimo Cozzi

Area
  - Total: 13.5 km^{2} (5.2 sq mi)
- Elevation: 175 m (574 ft)

Population (28 February 2017)
  - Total: 17,267
  - Density: 1,280/km^{2} (3,310/sq mi)
- Demonym: Nervianesi
- Time zone: UTC+1 (CET)
  - Summer (DST): UTC+2 (CEST)
- Postal code: 20014
- Dialing code: 0331
- Patron saint: San Fermo
- Website: Official website

Nerviano (Lombard: Nervian [nerˈʋjãː]) is a comune (municipality) in the northwestern part of the Metropolitan City of Milan in the Italian region Lombardy, located about 15 kilometres (9 mi) northwest of downtown Milan. Its territory is crossed by the Olona river and by the Villoresi Canal.

== See also ==
- Olona mills
