= Canegrate =

Canegrate Canegraa (Lombard)
- Comune
- Comune di Canegrate
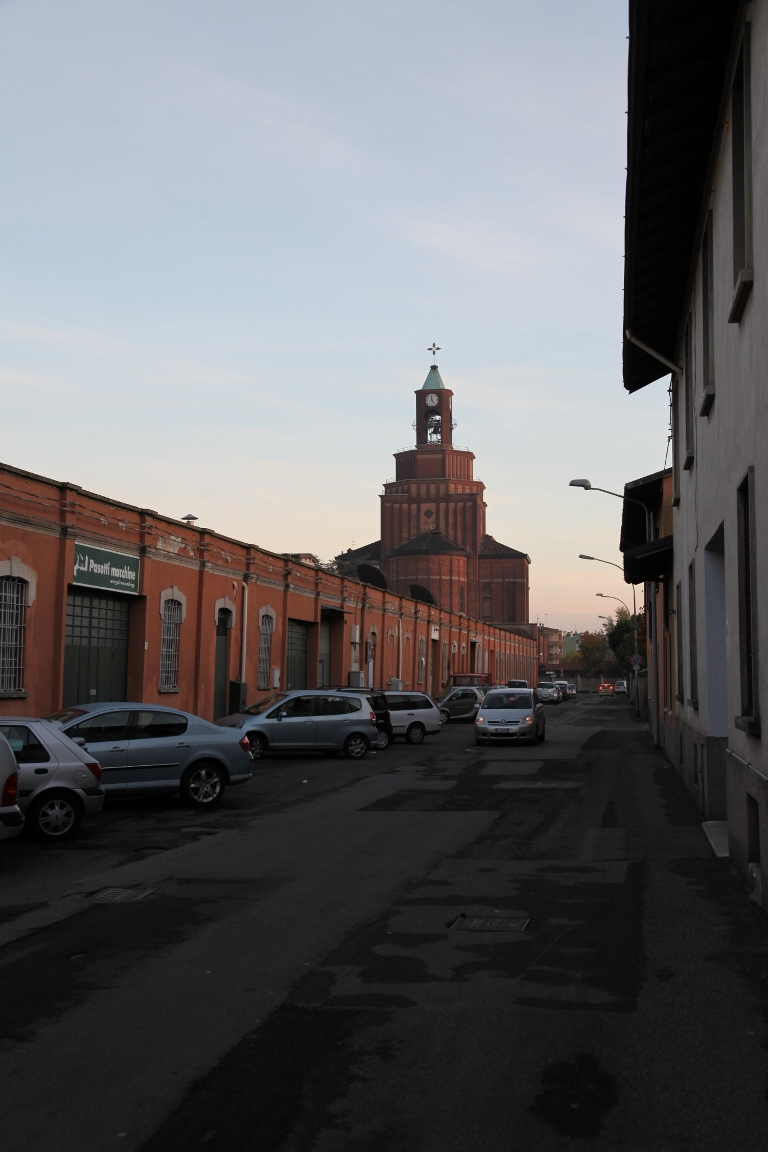
- Santa Maria Assunta church, Canegrate

- Coat of arms

- Location within Italy Location within Lombardy
- Coordinates: 45°34′N 8°56′E
- Country: Italy
- Region: Lombardy
- Metropolitan city: Milan (MI)

Government
  - Mayor: Matteo Modica (Centre-left)

Area
  - Total: 5.25 km^{2} (2.03 sq mi)
- Elevation: 196 m (643 ft)

Population (31 December 2021)
  - Total: 12,488
  - Density: 2,380/km^{2} (6,160/sq mi)
- Demonym: Canegratesi
- Time zone: UTC+1 (CET)
  - Summer (DST): UTC+2 (CEST)
- Postal code: 20039
- Dialing code: 0331
- Website: Official website

Canegrate (Lombard: Canegraa [kaneˈɡraː]) is a comune (municipality) in the Metropolitan City of Milan in the Italian region Lombardy, located about 20 kilometres (12 mi) northwest of Milan.

The town gave its name to the Canegrate culture, a prehistoric civilization whose main archaeological site has been excavated in the communal territory.
