= Marnate's Bunker =

Military monument in Italy

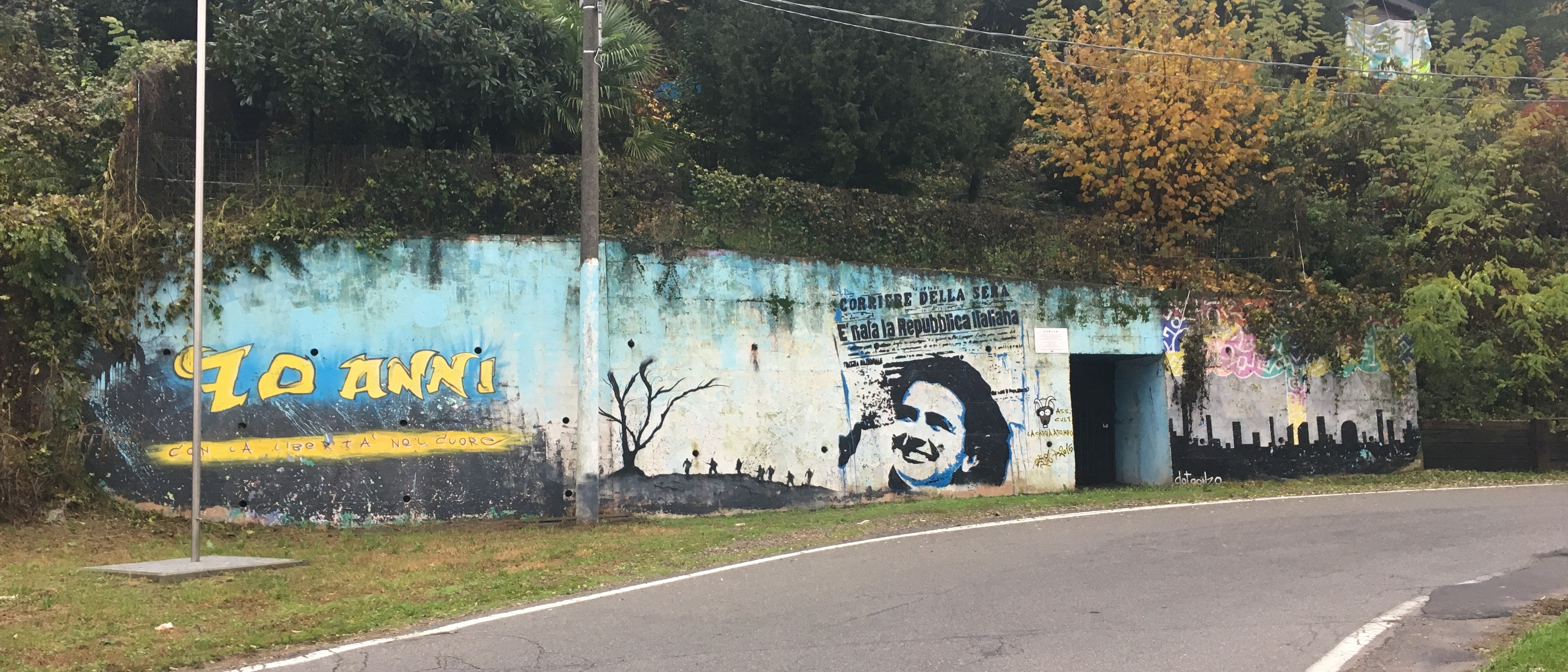
- Marnate's bunker view from the street

Dimensions
- Length: 143 meters
- Width: 1.80 meters
- Height: 2.20 meters
- Area: 143 m^{2}

Geographical Location
- Coordinates: 45.6351°N 8.8958°E Marnate's Bunker position in the map
- Country: Italy
- Town or City: Marnate
- Address: Via Lazzaretto 128, 21050 Marnate (VA)

General Informations
- Building type: Bunker
- Materials: Cement and bricks
- Owner: Marnate's Town administration
- Construction Started in: July 1944
- Completed in: September 1944
- Restored in: May 1991

Marnate's Bunker is a military monument of World War II, with the purpose of being used as an industrial bunker. It is located in Valle Olona (Varese), Italy, between the boundaries of Marnate, Olgiate Olona and Gorla Minore.

Built by the Germans between July and September 1944, Marnate's Bunker was conquered by the Italian resistance movement on 26 April 1945 after a harsh fight against the German garrison. During the fight, five Germans were killed, while from the Garibaldini only an Italian named Carlo Moltrasio from Fagnano Olona died, and two more were slightly injured. After the surrender of the Germans, the partisans inspected the bunker, finding it completely empty, except for a powerful bomb intended to destroy it.

== History ==
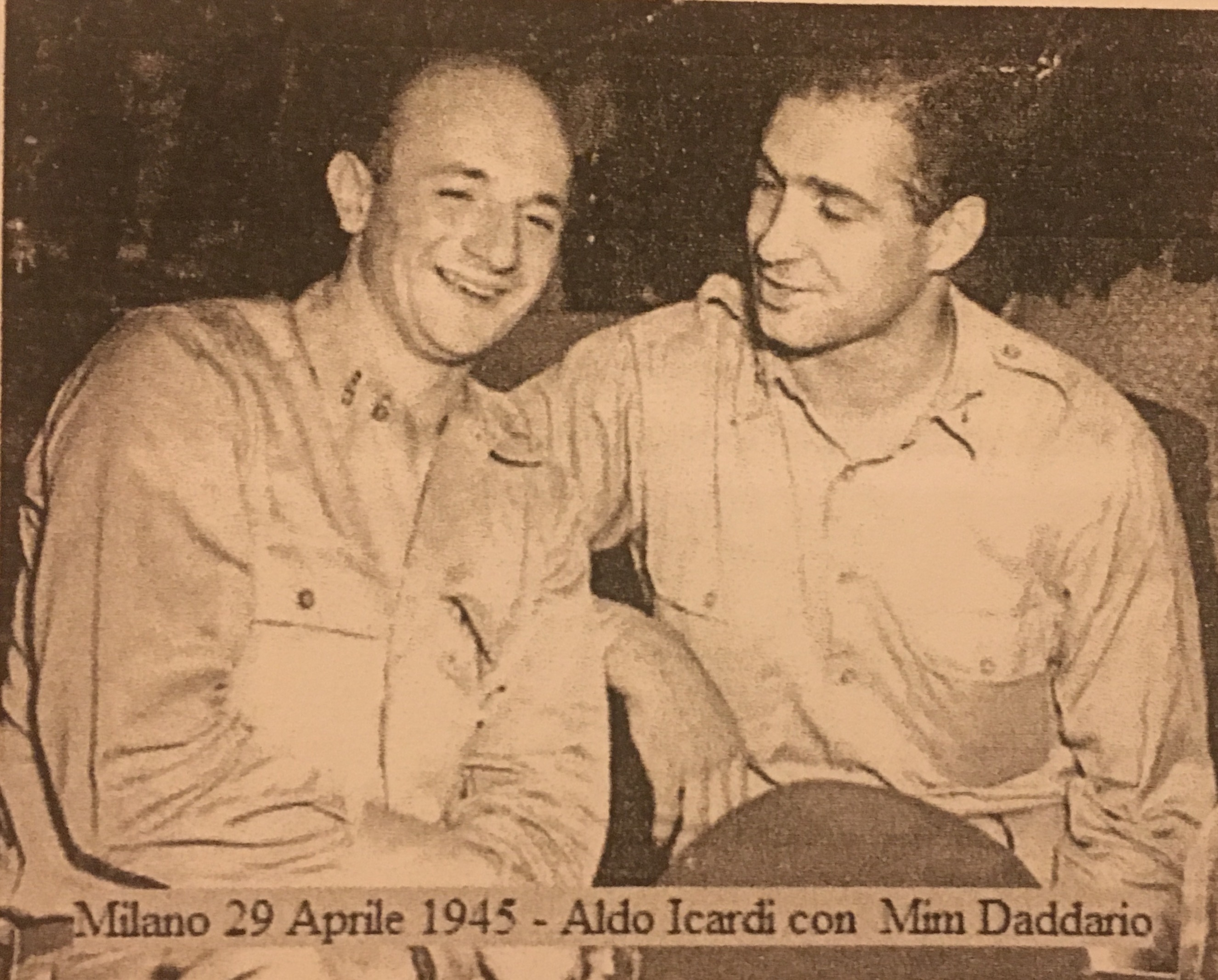
Aldo Icardi with Mim Daddario

In September 1944, Lieutenant Aldo Icardi, with the collaboration of the American Office of Strategic Services, parachuted behind the enemy lines of Mount Mottarone in command of Chrysler Mission with the specific task of capturing Benito Mussolini alive and giving him to the Allied command. Icardi was in Busto Arsizio when Marnate's Bunker was built. He gathered information about it, and his reports are available in American archives, through which it has been possible to rebuild the history of the structure.

Marnate's Bunker was strongly related to the German recovery of gold from the Macugnaga mines. SS-Obergruppenführer Karl Wolff, a German SS commandant in the Italian territory, ordered Captain Joseph Voettler, from the German SS garrison in Cernobbio, province of Como, to take direct control on the Italian-Swiss border and also to guarantee a safe way to export to Germany goods and machinery required by RuK (Rüstung und Kriegsproduktion), a ministry of armament and war production of the Italian Social Republic in the north of Italy. Captain Voettler was also instructed by Wolff to find in Switzerland a license for the distillation of gold, making possible the transportation of the semi-finished materials directly over the border. Voettler decided to trade by train because trucks were usually intercepted by planes, which patrolled the zone every day with two "Spitfires" named "Pippo" by the locals. Captain Voettler found an alternative method of sending these materials to Mendrisio, using the more irregular train times on the railway of Valmorea.

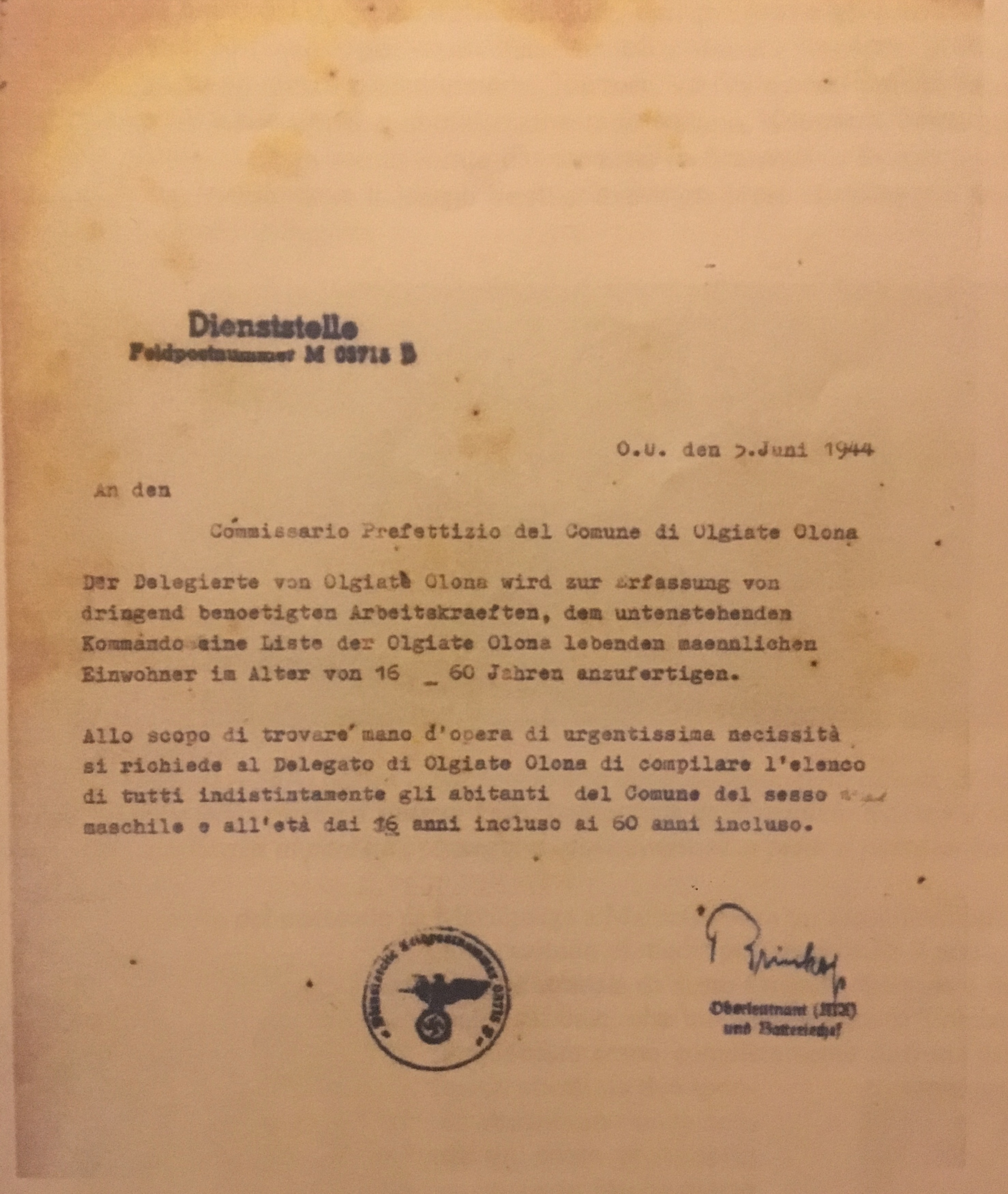
File sent to Olgiate Olona's city hall from the firm who had the duty to build Marnate's bunker

Captain Voettler found a solution with the German command of Olgiate Olona, located a few metres from Prospiano railway station, from which the material could be easily sent, either to Milan or directly to Mendrisio. Wolff approved the request and ordered the construction of a bunker close to the German command of Olgiate Olona to protect the material. The construction was assigned to General Hans Leyers, responsible for the RuK, located in Como, at the specific request of Captain Joseph Voettler. For the construction of the bunker, General Hans Leyers asked for the collaboration of the German military specialized in defence building, at the time engaged close to the Brenner Pass area. A workforce was recruited and after two months of work, digging under Marnate and removing about 600 m³ of material, the bunker was ready to receive the first shipments of gold. For the final transformation of the gold into blocks, Captain Voettler made an agreement with the Azienda Minerali Metallici Italiani firm, located in Milan. Supplied with the blocks, they should have been sent to Marnate, kept in the bunker, and then transported to Mendrisio in Switzerland. However, because of the daily bombing of Milan, sending the semi-finished gold directly from Marnate to Switzerland was considered.

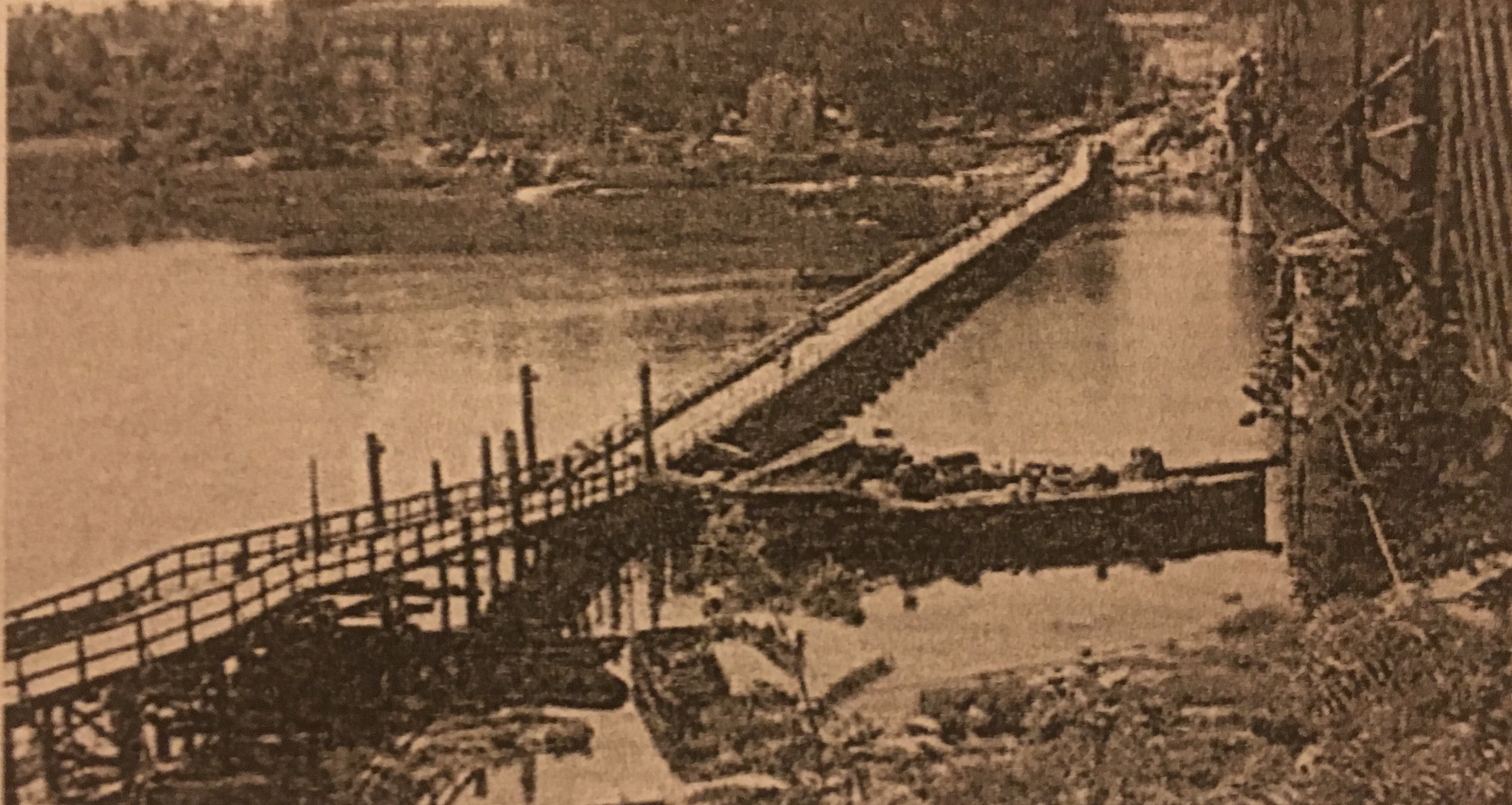
Sesto Calende's bridge destroyed by allies' bombs. In the center there is the bridge and in the background on the left there is Villa Angela which was one of the German's venues

For the transportation of materials from Macugnaga to Marnate, there was the sole possibility of using small trucks via a temporary bridge, since the railways from Sesto Calende, Oleggio and Turbigo were destroyed by the Allies, and Turbigo's bridge was controlled by them. After the bunker was built, the Nazis had to face the loss of Macugnaga's territory, taken by the Partisans. This made it impossible for the Germans to transport the gold from there for some time, but shortly after, on 10 October 1944, they regained control of the territory previously lost using their troops under the control of General Hans Leyers. As they checked the gold mines' status, 2,120 kg of semi-finished golden mud was found, which could be turned into 250 kg of pure gold, valued at around €3,500,000. They also found two crates containing two gold blocks: one of 10.427 kg and the other one of 7.03 kg. Leyers ordered to bring all the crates to Marnate's Bunker.

Mussolini became aware of the situation and intervened, sending a letter to Wolff, specifying that the gold was the property of the Government of the Italian Social Republic and should be returned. Mussolini blocked the whole operation and recovered all the material.

Wolff was instructed to send the crates containing the semi-finished golden mud to Monza instead of Marnate. At Monza, SS-Brigadeführer Willy Tensfeld gave them to R.S.I. The crates containing the two golden ingots were found some years later, in 1946, in a bank in Garda, Veneto.

== Construction ==
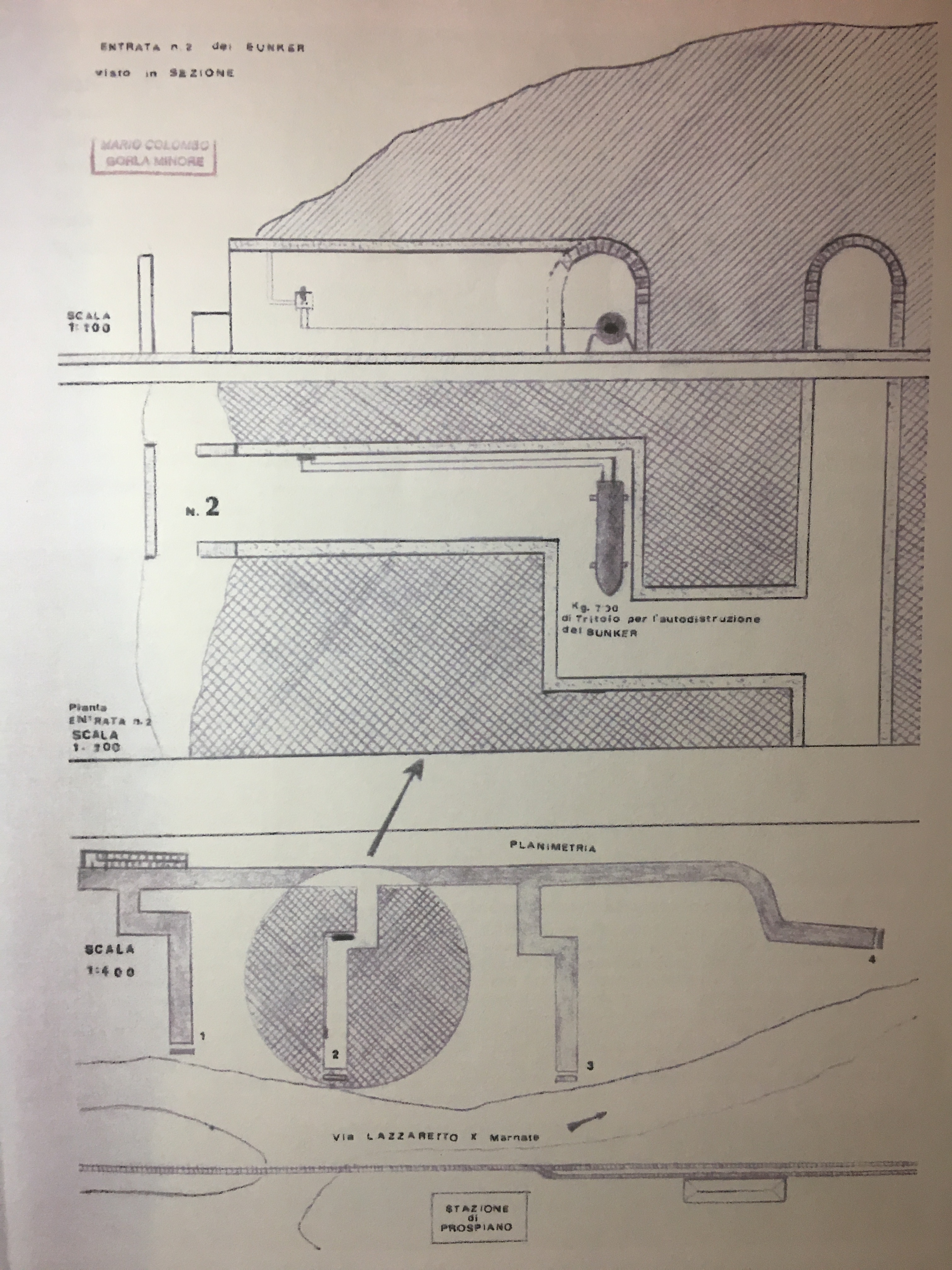
Marnate's bunker map

The structure is placed on a 143 m^{2} area with a 2.20 m height and 1.80 m width with four openings for access and an inside stair made of cement that links to the blockhouse situated on the bunker.

It was originally assumed to have been constructed as an air-raid shelter; however, this conclusion was undermined by limited capacity (a shelter could have hosted about 400 people) and the number of workers used to build it (no more than 25 people). In addition, the 700 kg bomb found inside the bunker and the blockhouse on its surface made it impossible to endorse the hypothesis that it was built for the purpose of protecting people. Subsequently, reports from Lieutenant Aldo Icardi led to the conclusion that the main purpose of Marnate's Bunker was the storage of gold material.

== Post-war events ==
During the 1970s, a few veterans returned to the bunker to attempt to recover part of the treasure, but the attempt was terminated following a car accident.

In May 1991, Marnate's Bunker was renovated by the Associazione Nazionale Partigiani d'Italia (ANPI). At that time, only one of the four entries was clear and unobstructed. During this renovation, vegetation and debris were removed from another two entries, and a 100-metre-long passageway was found. Subsequently, a sketch map was created of the bunker. As of 2016, the two remaining entries remain closed.

== Renovation ==
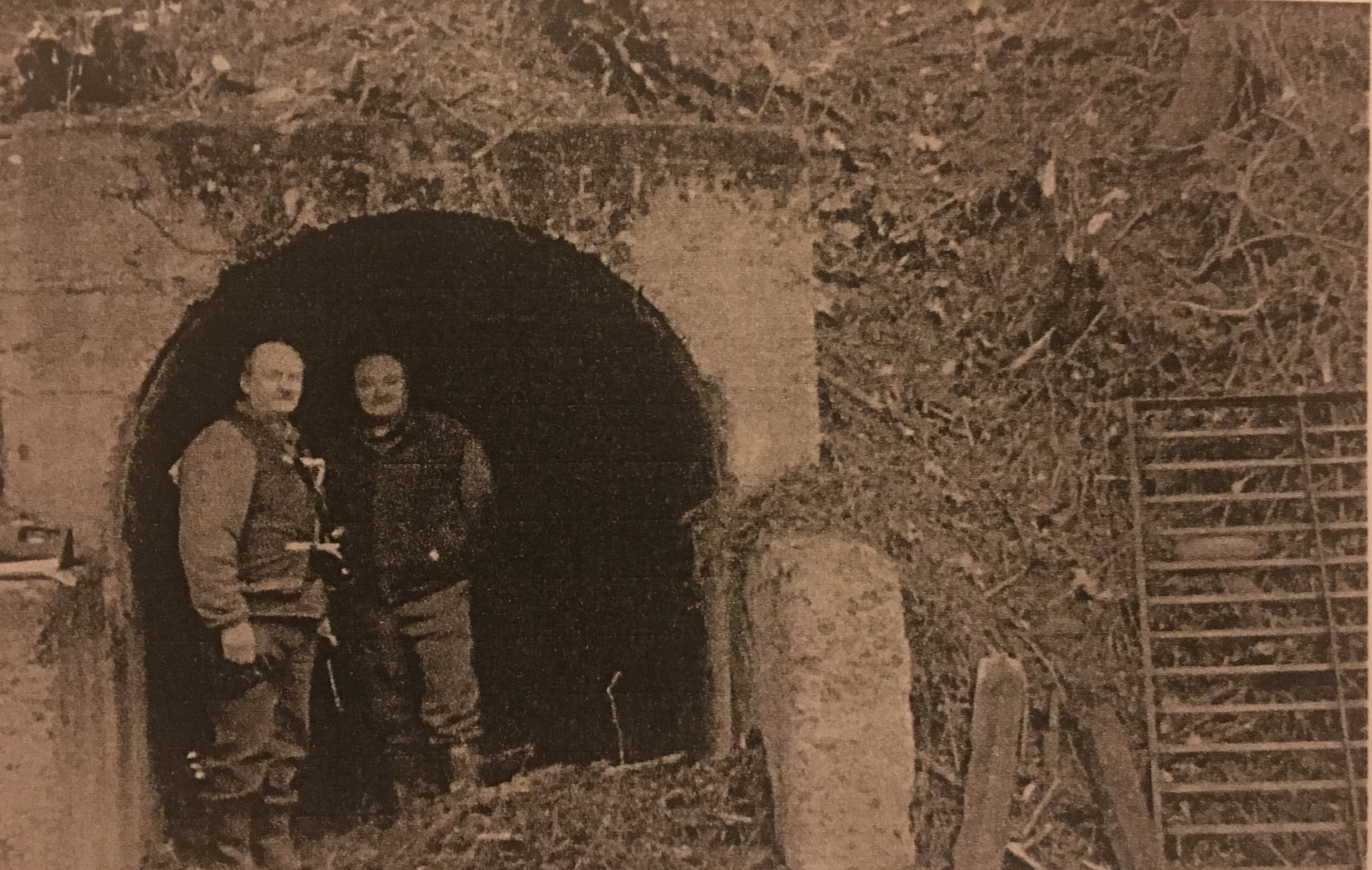
Mario Colombo with Emilio Piatti

In March 2015, Marnate's Bunker opened to the public in collaboration with Mario Colombo, president of the ANPI in Gorla. During the inauguration, a dedication to Carlo Moltrasio and to all the victims of the war was made, with the participation of Ester De Tomasi, ANPI province president, Antonio Pizzinato, national leader, the municipality administrations in Medio Olona, and Gunnar Vincenzi, province president.

The main purpose is to use the bunker as a museum to keep alive the memory of the war, its victims, and to render homage to the courageousness of all the partisans of Valle Olona, who in April 1945 attacked the bunker and took it from the Nazis. In 2016, the bunker remained closed to the public due to the risk of structural instability.

== In popular culture ==
In 2012 the bunker was used as a filming location for a short horror film called "Ariadne's Thread", directed by Michele Puricelli Abraham, well known as Michele Abraham.

The story is about two teenagers who meet in a pub in Valle Olona. They decide to go to Marnate's Bunker, abandoned since World War II. The excursion inside the bunker turns into a dangerous trap, from which they do not return.

This short horror film alludes to the renowned myth of Theseus and Knossos Labyrinth, in which people could easily lose themselves and be eaten by the Minotaur, a monstrous Greek mythological creature. The Bunker is used by the director as a movie set to create mystery with dark and narrow spaces.

The association La Capra a Tempo realized a mural on the external wall of the bunker, showing the memorable edition of the first page of June 11, 1946 on the newspaper Corriere della Sera.

== Gallery ==
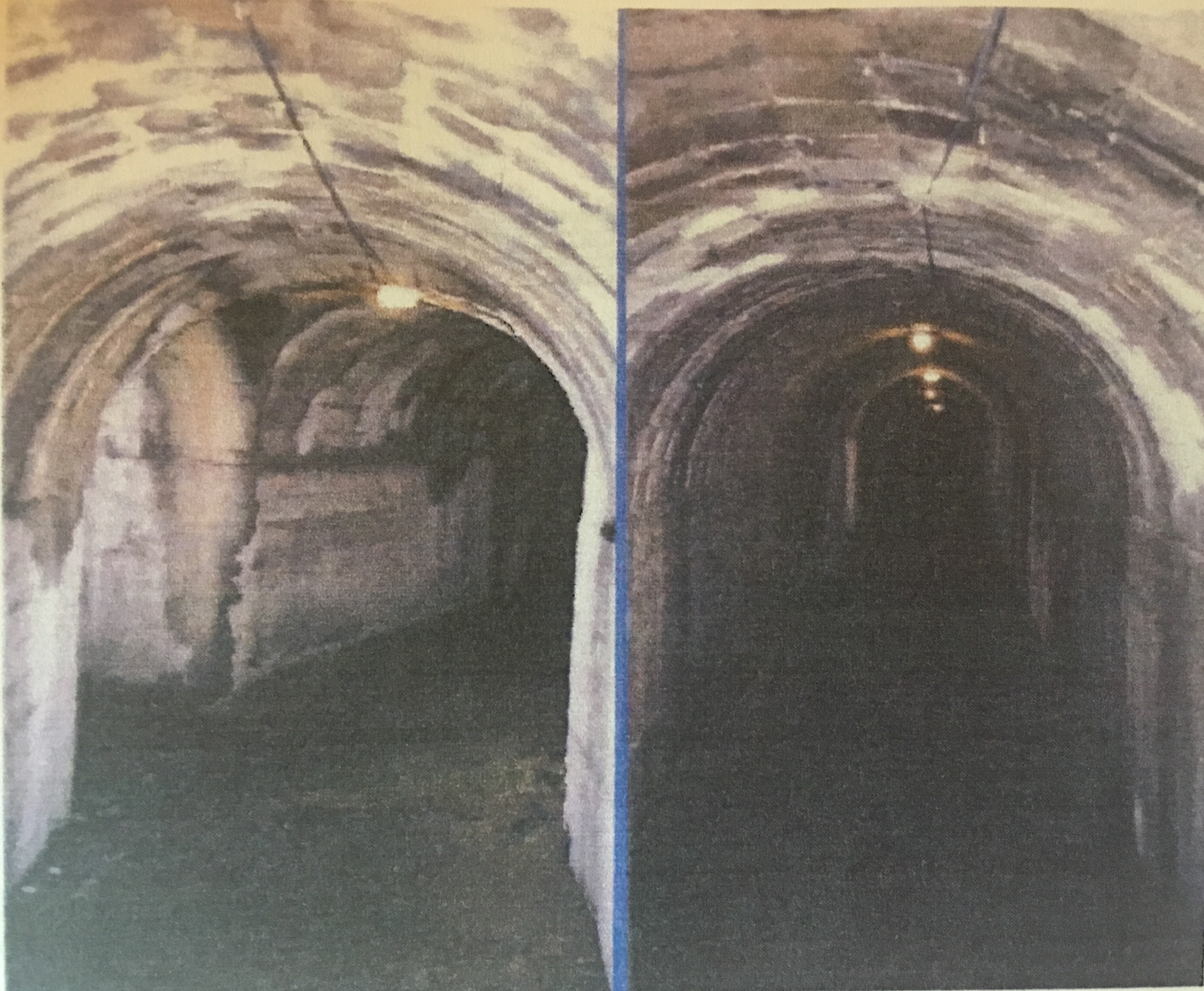
Interior of Marnate's bunker

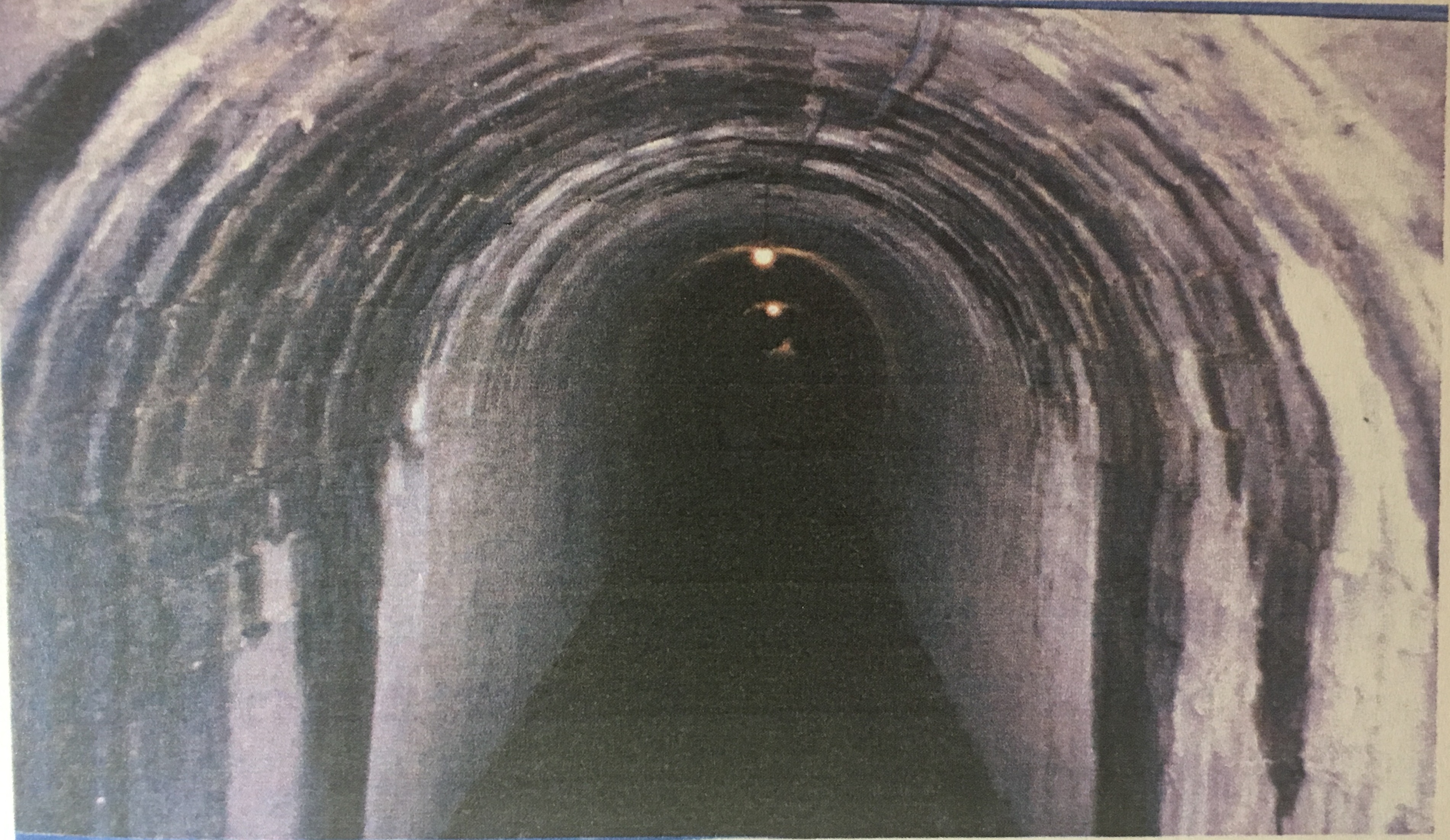
One of the corridors of Marnate's bunker

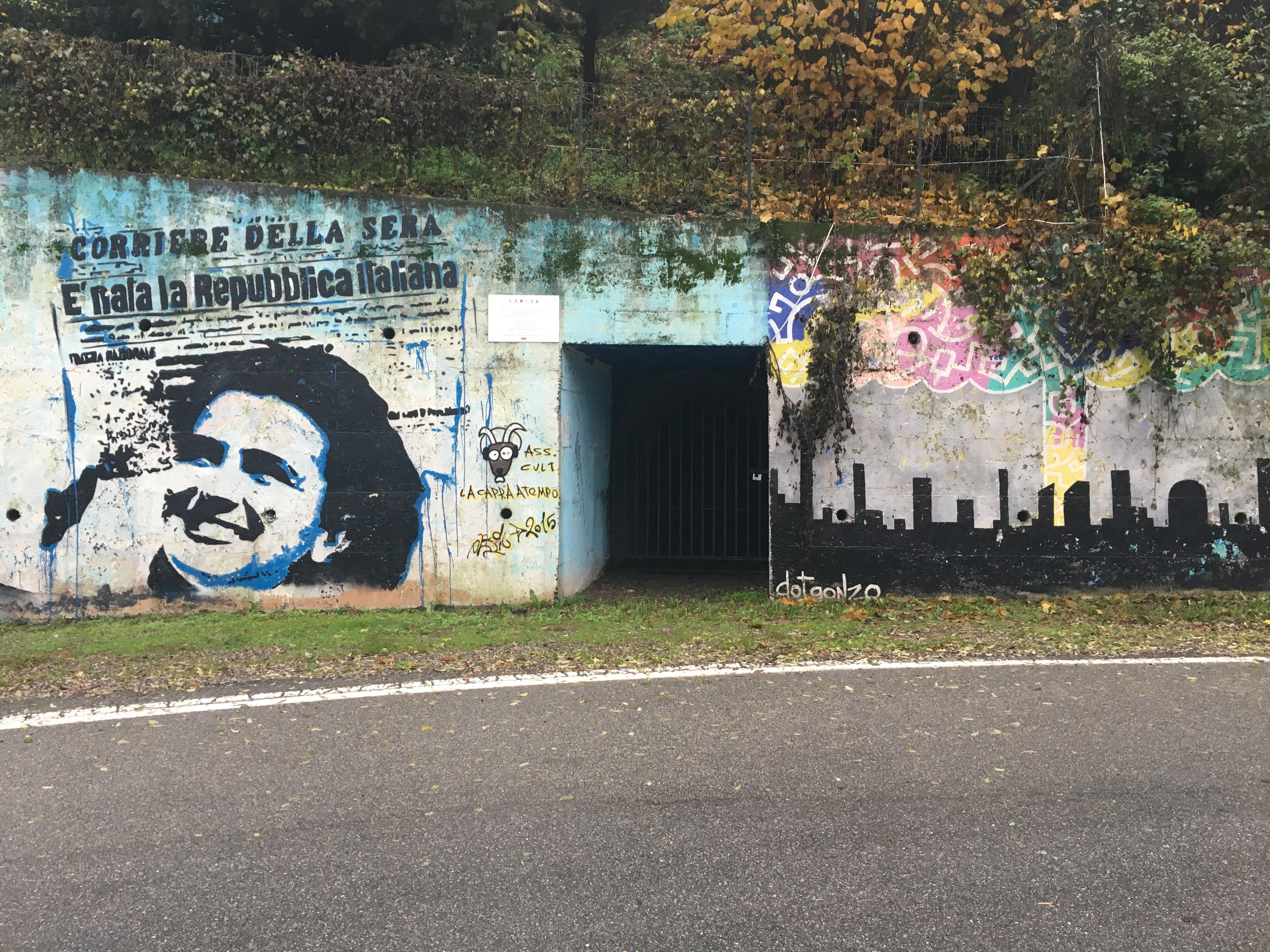
The entrance of Marnate's bunker

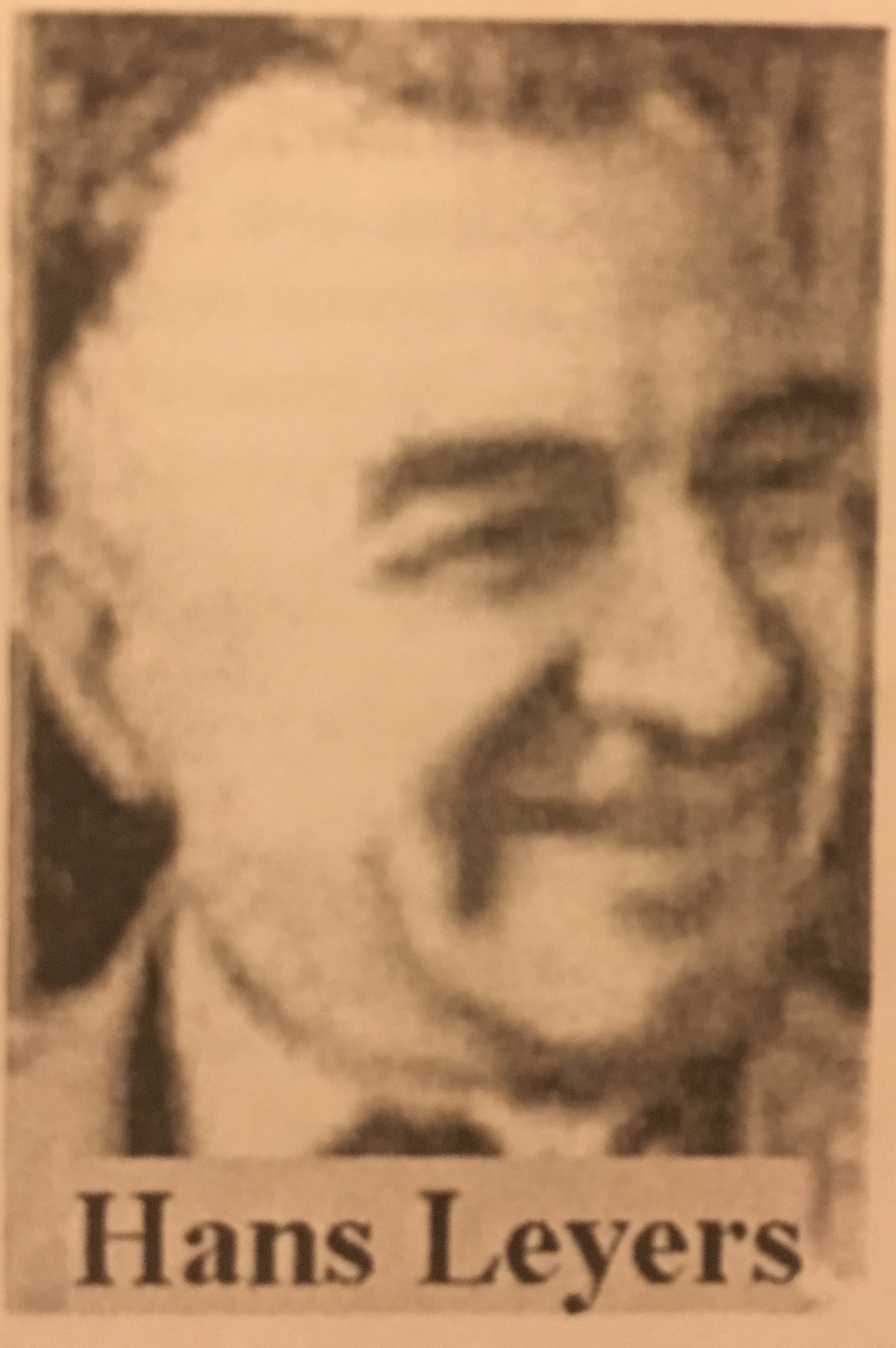
Hans Leyers

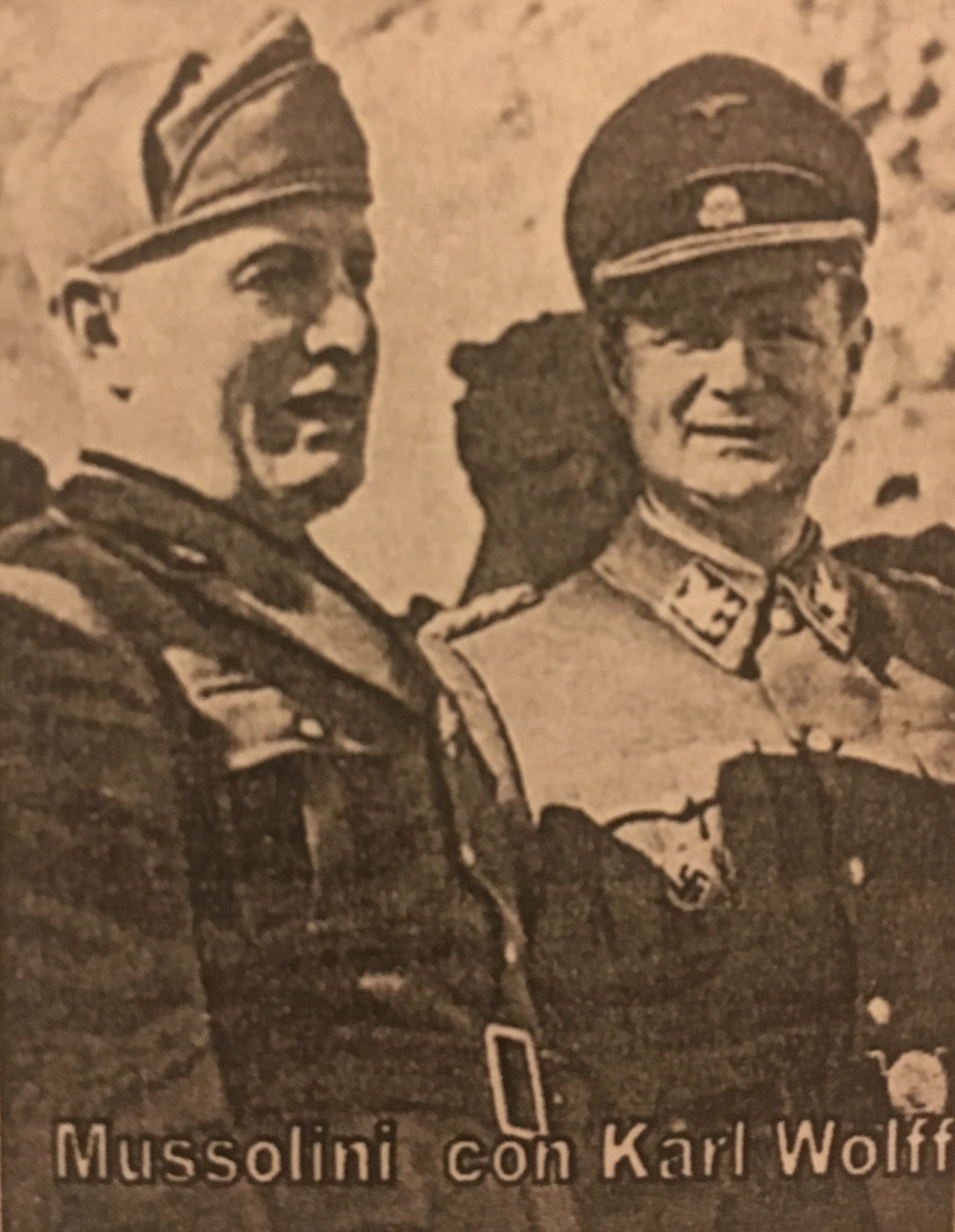
Mussolini with Karl Wolff

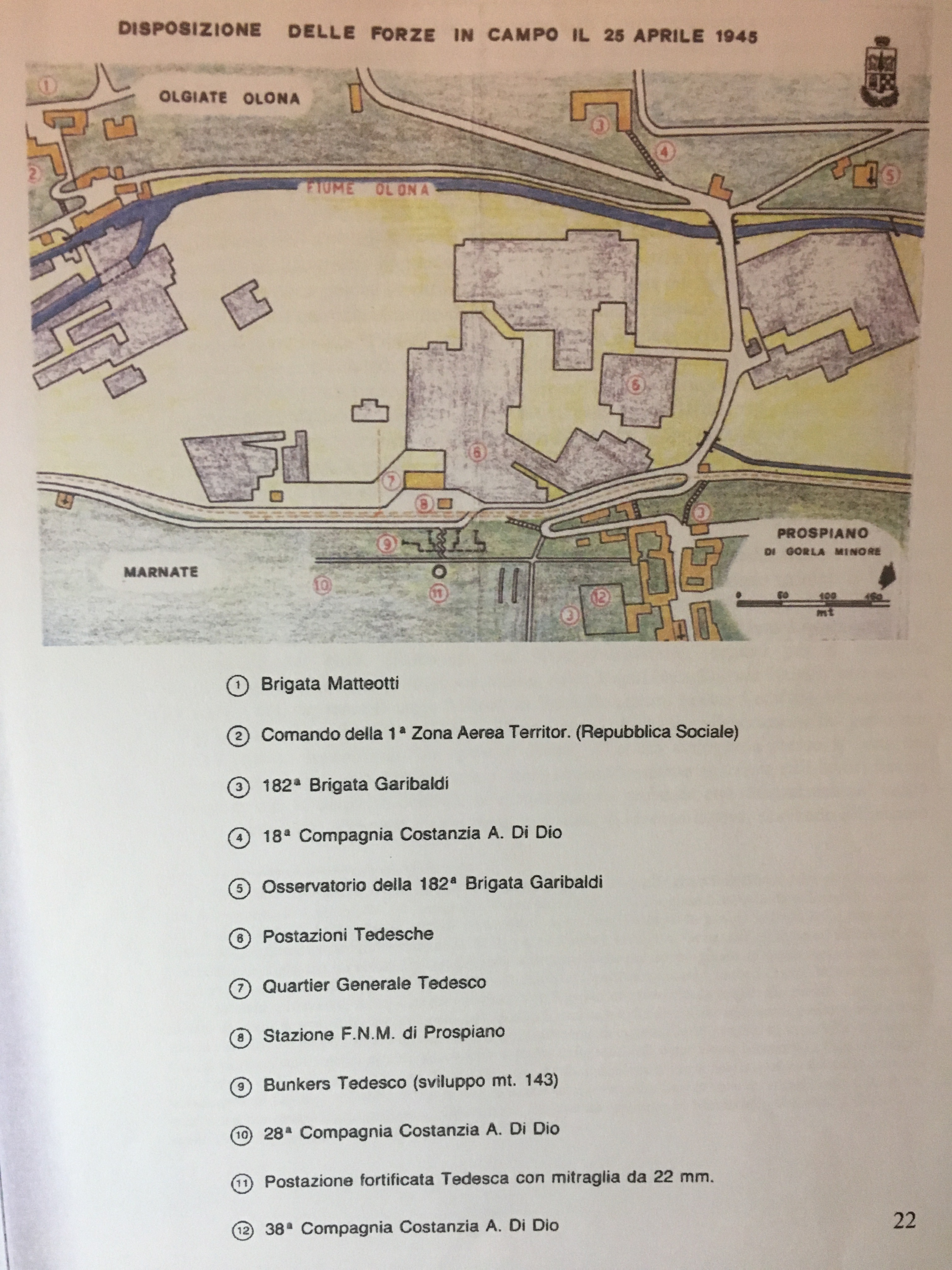
Forces disposition on 25 April 1945

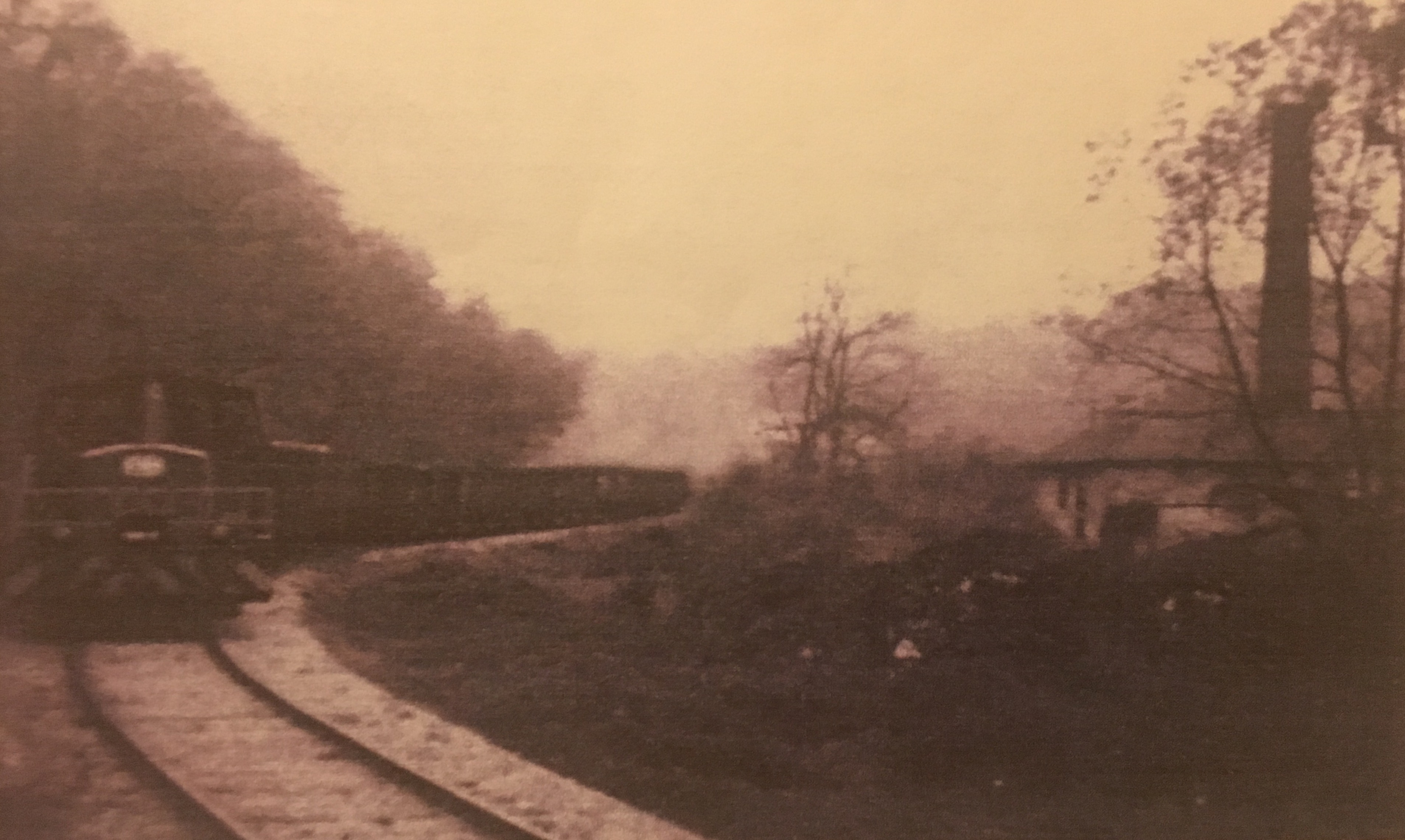
Marnate in the 40s - picture taken between Marnate and Prospiano's station

== See also ==
- Italian resistance movement
- Führerbunker
- Holohan murder case
- Karl Wolff
- Italian Social Republic
- Benito Mussolini
- Bunker
