= Marnate =

- Comune
- Comune di Marnate
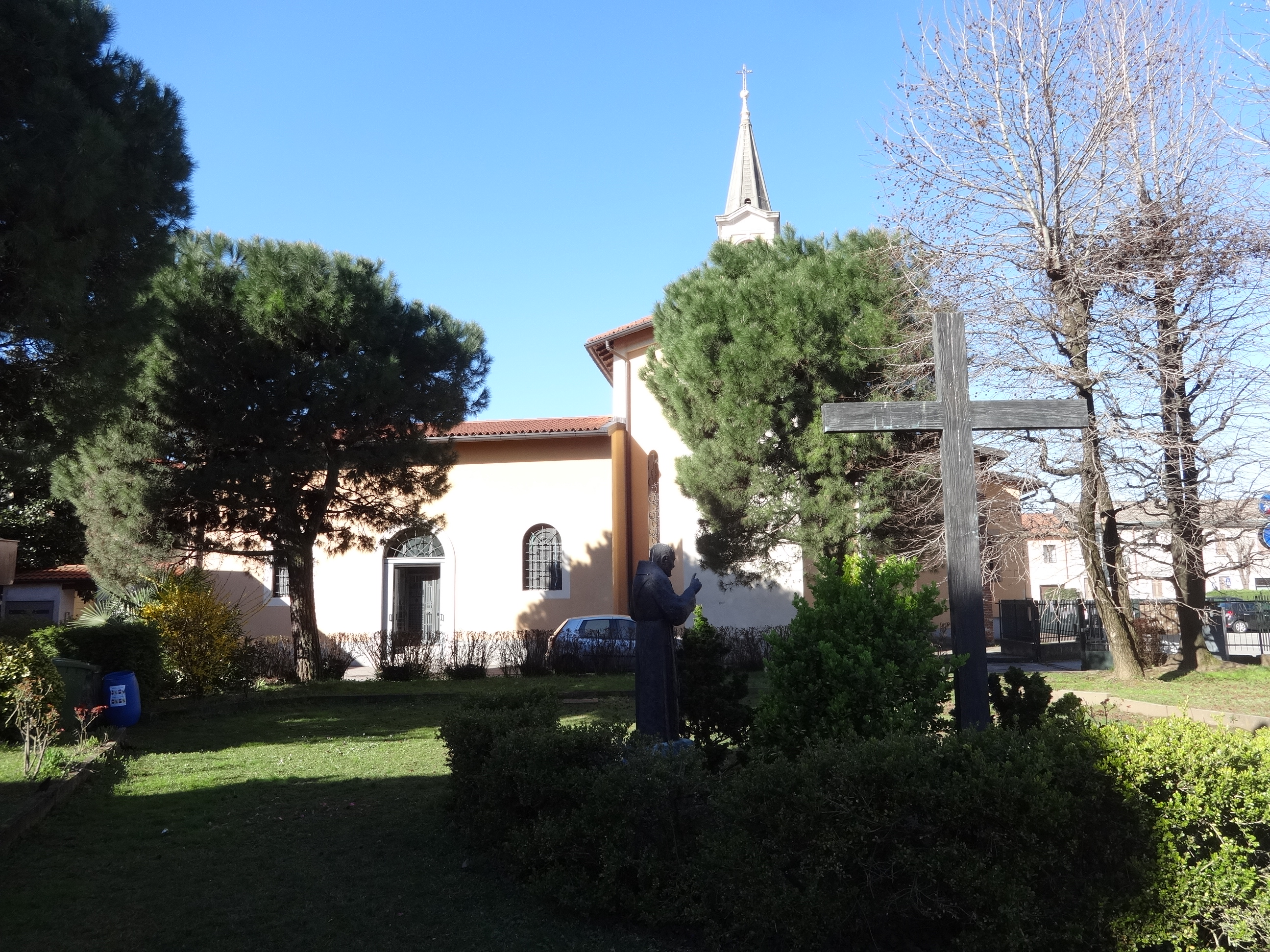

- Location within Italy Location within Lombardy
- Coordinates: 45°38′N 8°54′E
- Country: Italy
- Region: Lombardy
- Province: Province of Varese (VA)
- Frazioni: Nizzolina

Area
  - Total: 4.8 km^{2} (1.9 sq mi)

Population (Dec. 2004)
  - Total: 6,237
  - Density: 1,300/km^{2} (3,400/sq mi)
- Demonym: Marnatesi
- Time zone: UTC+1 (CET)
  - Summer (DST): UTC+2 (CEST)
- Postal code: 21050
- Dialing code: 0331

Marnate is a comune (municipality) in the Province of Varese in the Italian region Lombardy, located about 30 km (19 mi) northwest of Milan and about 20 km (12 mi) south of Varese. As of 31 December 2018, it had a population of 7,936 and an area of 4.8 km^{2} (1.9 sq mi).

The municipality of Marnate contains the frazione (subdivision) Nizzolina.

Marnate borders the following municipalities: Castellanza, Gorla Minore, Olgiate Olona, Rescaldina.

One of the main place in Marnate is called Marnate's Bunker which is a military monument of II World War.

== Demographic evolution ==
Historical population

Year	Pop.	±%
1861	1,007	—
1871	1,022	+1.5%
1881	1,050	+2.7%
1901	1,495	+42.4%
1911	2,004	+34.0%

Year	Pop.	±%
1921	2,205	+10.0%
1931	2,615	+18.6%
1936	2,692	+2.9%
1951	3,056	+13.5%
1961	3,452	+13.0%

Year	Pop.	±%
1971	4,577	+32.6%
1981	5,576	+21.8%
1991	5,639	+1.1%
2001	5,967	+5.8%

Source: Data from ISTAT
