= Michael Stern (journalist) =

American journalist (1910–2009)

- Born: August 3, 1910; Brooklyn, New York City, U.S.
- Died: April 7, 2009 (aged 98); Lake Worth, Florida, U.S.
- Occupations: Reporter, author
- Spouse: Estelle (née Goldstein) Stern (1934–1995 (her death))

Michael Stern (August 3, 1910 – April 7, 2009) was an American reporter, author and philanthropist. As a reporter during World War II he issued some of the first accounts from a liberated Rome, Italy in June 1944. He later worked in concert with Zachary Fisher to create the Intrepid Sea-Air-Space Museum in New York City, United States.

== Early life ==
Stern was born on August 3, 1910, at a farm in the Brooklyn borough of New York City and attended Alexander Hamilton High School (now Paul Robeson High School) there. He majored in journalism at Syracuse University, Syracuse, New York, leaving school just before his graduation.

== Journalism ==
After leaving college, he took a job at The New York Journal in New York City but left for a better position at the Middletown Times-Herald (now the Times Herald-Record), Middletown, New York. During the early 1930s, Stern worked on a part-time basis in the office of the Kings County, New York, District Attorney where his investigation led to the conviction of those behind a prostitution ring; it became the basis for his 1936 book, The White Ticket: Commercialized Vice in the Machine Age.

He was hired by Bernarr Macfadden in 1933 at the rate of 3.5 cents per word as an investigative reporter for Macfadden's pulp magazines, such as True Detective Mysteries. Stern wrote under pseudonyms for other similar publications, earning at times half of Macfadden's rate per word.

Stern worked for True magazine under an assumed name where he wrote a series of articles about former Nazi Party official Otto Strasser, who formed the anti-Nazi Black Front and left Germany to escape Adolf Hitler. These articles were later published in book form as Flight From Terror, which he wrote together with Strasser. He was granted a bachelor's degree from Syracuse University based on the book.

His interviews with the crew of the B-17 Flying Fortress bomber Memphis Belle were the basis for his book Into the Jaws of Death.

== World War II and Rome ==
With the U.S. Army during World War II, he was a war correspondent starting in 1943 for the North American Newspaper Alliance and Fawcett Publications, publisher of True. He followed Allied forces to Algeria as part of Operation Torch, and accompanied the Allied troops during their invasion of Sicily and their subsequent invasion of mainland Italy. Together with Fred Rosen, Stern entered Rome on June 3, 1944, one day before the American forces, under General Mark Wayne Clark, took control of the city from the retreating German Army.

He stayed in Rome for the next 50 years, reporting on Sicilian mobster Lucky Luciano and other colorful characters from that period. In 1947 he managed to interview with the Italian bandit Salvatore Giuliano which was published in True magazine in 1947. These profiles were collected for his 1953 book No Innocence Abroad, which included details of the Holohan Murder Case, in which an American OSS agent in Italy behind enemy lines was killed in 1944 by his own men. After former Lt. Aldo Icardi was charged with perjury in August 1955 based on his testimony to a Congressional subcommittee about the circumstances of Holahan's death(case was dismissed by the Hon. Keech), The New York Times credited Stern's investigations, in addition to efforts by Holahan's brother and those of U.S. and Italian authorities, in having the case pursued.

Robert Ruark wrote the foreword for Stern's 1964 book, An American in Rome, describing Stern as "a legend in modern Rome" who is "a tough boy, and... writes tough prose".

== Filmmaker ==
Stern entered film production while in Rome. His first film was the 1960 movie Femmine di lusso (released in the United States as Love, the Italian Way), directed by Giorgio Bianchi and starring Elke Sommer and Ugo Tognazzi; The 1967 film L'Avventuriero (also released as The Rover), directed by Terence Young, starred Rita Hayworth and Anthony Quinn; Tognazzi also starred in the 1968 version of Satyricon, directed by Gian Luigi Polidoro. His 1988 film Run for Your Life starred Lauren Hutton and George Segal.

== Philanthropy ==
During his travels to the U.S., Stern developed a friendship with builder and philanthropist Zachary Fisher. Together, they established the Intrepid Museum Foundation in 1978 to raise the funds needed to establish the Intrepid Sea-Air-Space Museum, on the Hudson River in the Manhattan borough of New York City which opened in 1982.

The two also collaborated on the creation of the Fisher House program to create lodging for families of those military personnel who have been in medical-care facilities and the Fisher Center for Alzheimer's Research Foundation at Rockefeller University, New York City.

He created the Michael Stern Parkinson's Research Foundation in 2001. Currently, actor Michael J. Fox (who was diagnosed with Parkinson's in 1991) is hoping to merge their two charities, seeing promising research in Stern's foundation.

== Personal ==
He married Estelle Goldstein in 1934; she died in 1995.

A resident of Lake Worth, Florida, Stern died at age 98 on April 7, 2009, in Lake Worth, Florida, Florida, due to pancreatic cancer. He was survived by a son, a daughter and a granddaughter.
