= Olgiate Olona =

- Comune
- Comune di Olgiate Olona
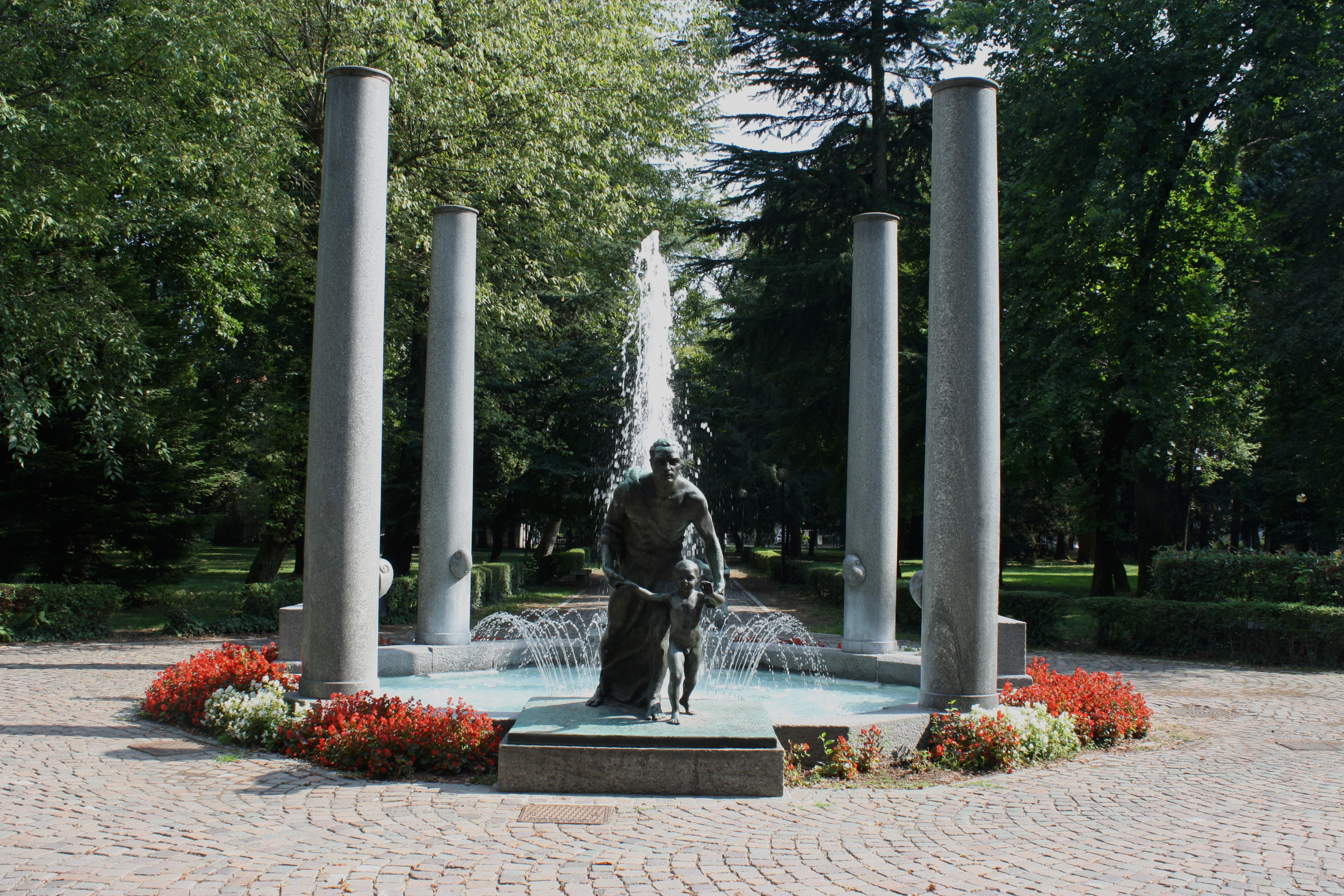

- Location within Italy Location within Lombardy
- Coordinates: 45°38′N 08°53′E
- Country: Italy
- Region: Lombardy
- Province: Varese (VA)
- Frazioni: Gerbone, Buon Gesù

Government
  - Mayor: Giovanni Montano

Area
  - Total: 7 km^{2} (2.7 sq mi)
- Elevation: 235 m (771 ft)

Population (2020)
  - Total: 12 542
  - Density: 1.7/km^{2} (4.4/sq mi)
- Demonym: Olgiatesi
- Time zone: UTC+1 (CET)
  - Summer (DST): UTC+2 (CEST)
- Postal code: 21057
- Dialing code: 0331
- Patron saint: SS. Stefano and Lorenzo
- Website: Official website

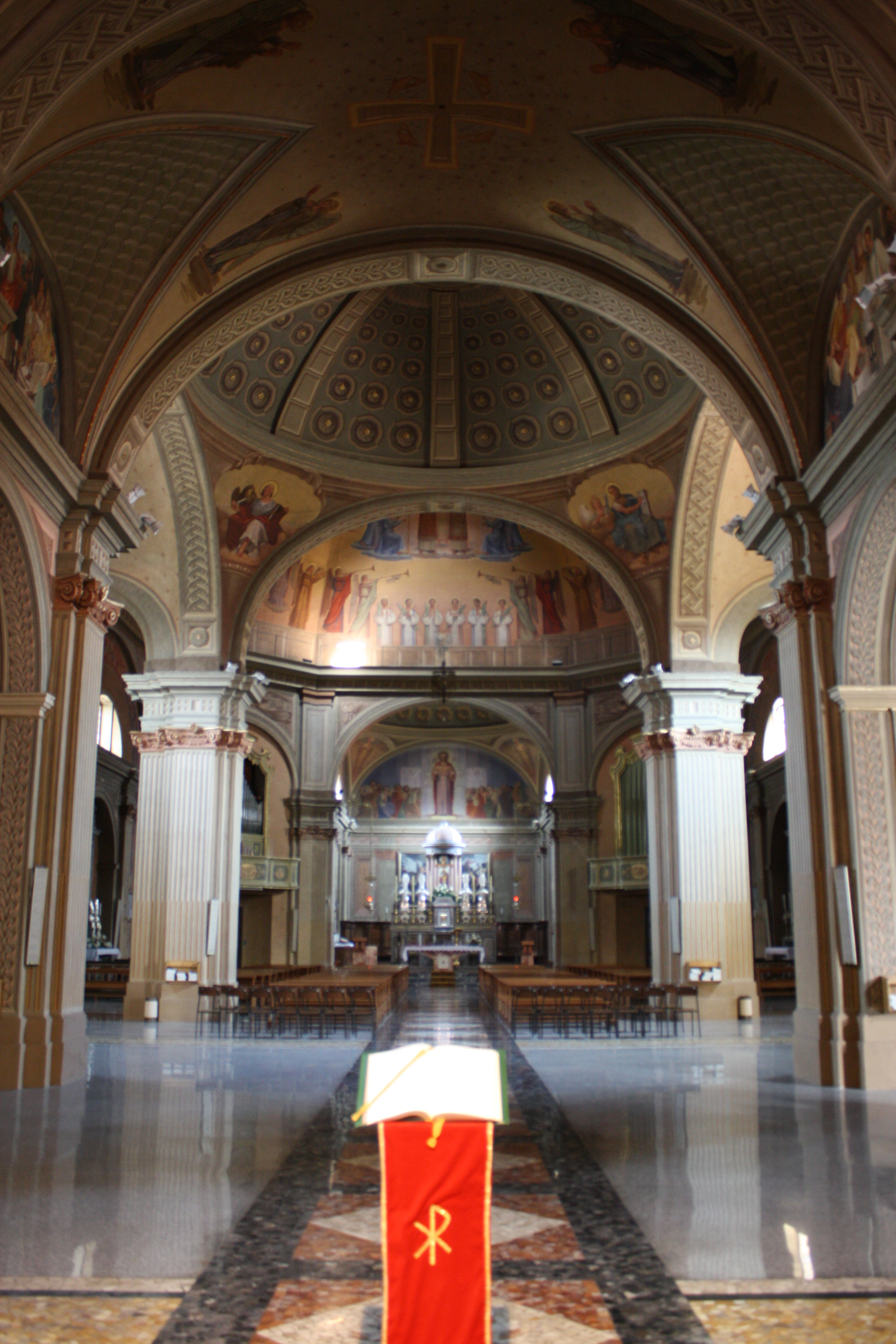
The church of the Center

Olgiate Olona is a town and comune located in the province of Varese, in the Lombardy region of northern Italy. The town is bathed by the river Olona. The nearest city to Olgiate Olona is Busto Arsizio, about 3 kilometres (2 mi) away.

The town of Olgiate Olona is divided into three "districts": the Center, Gerbone and Buon Gesù.

Between boundaries of Marnate and Gorla Minore is located a military monument of World War II called Marnate's Bunker.
