= Gorla Minore =

- Comune
- Comune di Gorla Minore
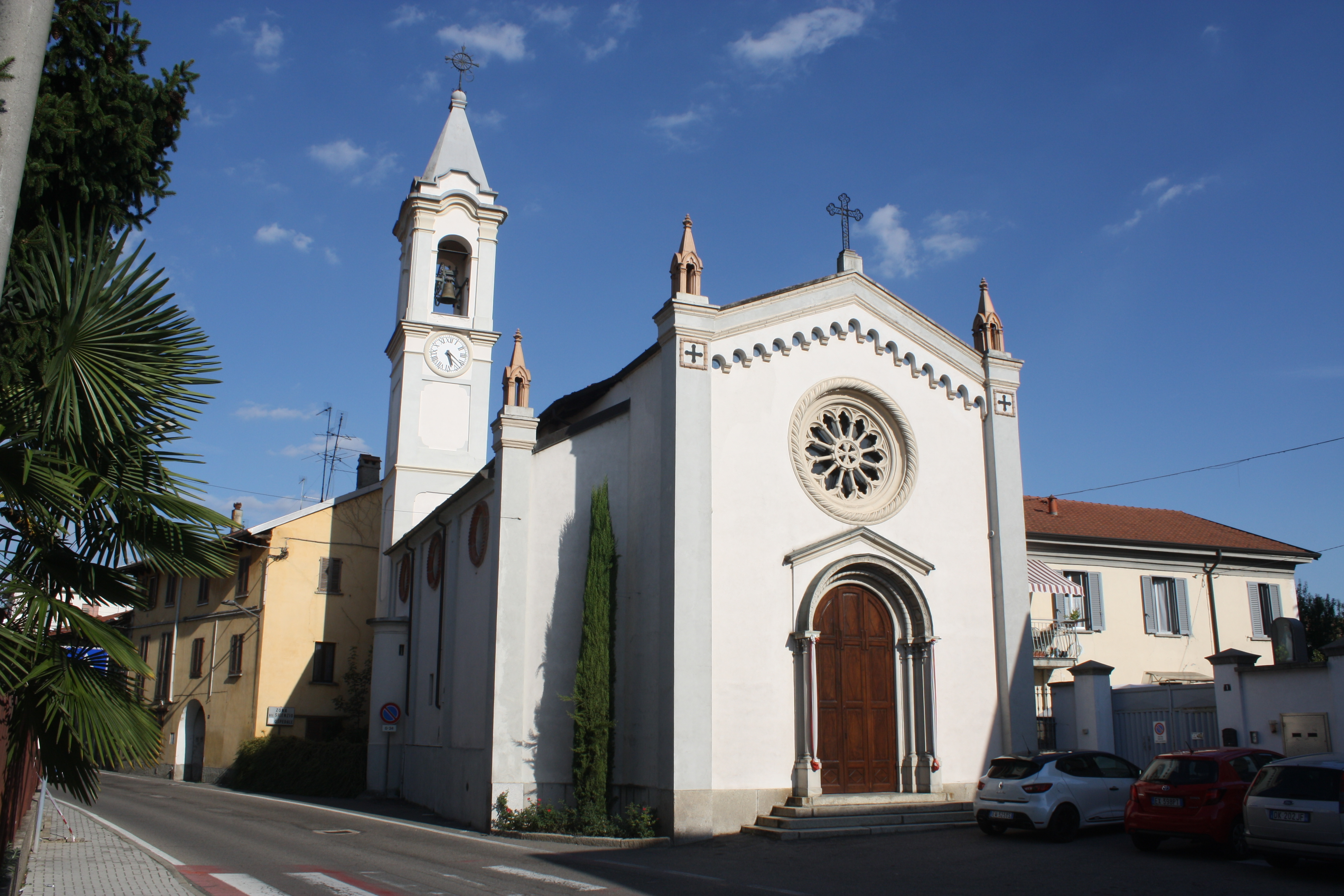

- Location within Italy Location within Lombardy
- Coordinates: 45°38′N 8°54′E
- Country: Italy
- Region: Lombardy
- Province: Province of Varese (VA)
- Frazioni: Prospiano

Area
  - Total: 7.7 km^{2} (3.0 sq mi)
- Elevation: 237 m (778 ft)

Population (Dec. 2004)
  - Total: 7,894
  - Density: 1,000/km^{2} (2,700/sq mi)
- Demonym: Gorlesi
- Time zone: UTC+1 (CET)
  - Summer (DST): UTC+2 (CEST)
- Postal code: 21055
- Dialing code: 0331
- Website: Official website

Gorla Minore is a comune (municipality) in the Province of Varese in the Italian region Lombardy, located about 30 kilometres (19 mi) northwest of Milan and about 15 kilometres (9 mi) southeast of Varese. As of 31 December 2018, it had a population of 8,364 and an area of 7.7 square kilometres (3.0 mi^{2}).

The municipality of Gorla Minore contains the frazione (subdivision) of Prospiano.

Gorla Minore borders the following municipalities: Cislago, Gorla Maggiore, Marnate, Mozzate, Olgiate Olona, Rescaldina, Solbiate Olona.

Between the boundaries of Marnate and Olgiate Olona is located a military monument of World War II called Marnate's Bunker.

== Education ==
Gorla Minore hosts the Catholic charter school Collegio Rotondi, which was established in 1599.

== Museum of Art and Crafts ==
This Museum in Gorla Minore was opened to the public in the 21st century by the president of the Recreational Club, Mr. Bruno Mercante. The inauguration was realised in June 2008.

The building, in the past, was the cooperative, at the time of its dissolution mayor Lattuada took over the premises and proceeded to the restoration. Today the Museum houses hundreds of objects of the Gorlese peasant tradition donated by the population and members of the club.

Before entering the Museum there is a large mural representing some significant places of Prospiano, the barrels with the names of the wines and an elderly couple counting eggs. This work was commissioned by the Recreation Centre in collaboration with the Municipal Administration of Gorla Minore and was carried out by Guido Bedramin.

At the entrance, there are shelves of polished olive wood full of bottles of wine and ancient liqueurs, and also objects of the peasant tradition divided into categories that we put down below.

=== The farmer ===
The part dedicated to the farmer’s craft contains a large number of objects that have behind them stories of everyday life. All the tools on display are made of wood and metal.

Among these is also the hay cutter, a tool used to cut hay of different qualities to be given to the animals, so that their feeding was diversified.

There is a plough with a yoke that was attached to the cows, rakes and sickles with which, in the months of June and summer, they harvested the grain that was then cut, dried and beaten to obtain the grains. Straw was used to fill mattresses.

This photo, on the other hand, is a tool for shelling corn. Our grandparents were used to using every part of the ear of corn: the inside was burned instead of the more expensive wood, the leaves were used to make the mattress padding, instead of the straw that disintegrated immediately. With the leaves of the corn the mattress lasted longer, every morning the women worked it with their hands, and every year they enriched the mattress with additional leaves.

Once grained, the wheat was weighed with the scales and then it was taken to the mills to grind it, present in large quantities thanks to the Olona. Then with the sieves, they sifted the flour and remained the bran, the outer casing, used as feed for the chickens.

In mid-June, when the farmers collected the still not fully ripe grain, they left it to dry in the courtyard and beat it with a large wood, dangerous to use.

In addition to the tools used by the farmer, the Museum houses a wide variety of tools related to other trades until a few years ago very common and today almost forgotten.

=== The Carpenter ===
Among the objects of the carpenter, there is a wooden bench that is 150 years old, the screws are still wooden. There were tools for drilling, for widening the holes, for example to make the ladder rungs.

=== The Tailor and the Cobbler ===
The museum has a sewing machine with pedals. There are also the shapes to make and enlarge the shoes and especially the wooden clogs, to which nails were applied in order not to consume them. Even children used them to go to school.

=== The Blacksmith ===
In the section of the blacksmith are collected several tools including, an anvil and horseshoes that were put hot on the hoof to take shape well. Then nails were inserted to fix them.

=== The cashier ===
There is an old cash register used by shopkeepers who worked in shops. The Museum also contains objects in the homes of our grandparents and mainly used by women.

=== In the House ===
In the part relating to domestic life, we find: grinders and irons, a "machine svea" dialect expression to indicate a tool that was used to heat the milk; the sink that was placed in the bedroom because in the houses there was no bathroom. In the event that some need was felt at night, urine was used, which was always present.

There are various tools used for the processing of wool: the tool for scarring the wool, the spindle for spinning, the tool to make spools of wire.

Moreover, there is a machine to drain the wool contained in mattresses. Usually, every ten years the mattress was opened, the wool was enlarged, made more inflated, to make the mattress as comfortable as possible.

There are also old gramophones that were used to listen to music and military radios, wooden skis, and old musical instruments.

=== Other ===
Finally, the museum houses three moving reconstructions made by Piero Cromi that represent:

- The wheat tower, wheat harvesting
- The thresher of via Giovanni Bosco
- The crib

== Demographic evolution ==
Historical population

Year	Pop.	±%
1861	1,641	—
1871	2,011	+22.5%
1881	1,927	−4.2%
1901	2,793	+44.9%
1911	3,287	+17.7%

Year	Pop.	±%
1921	3,465	+5.4%
1931	3,782	+9.1%
1936	3,983	+5.3%
1951	4,699	+18.0%
1961	5,073	+8.0%

Year	Pop.	±%
1971	5,676	+11.9%
1981	6,327	+11.5%
1991	6,882	+8.8%
2001	7,446	+8.2%

Source: Data from ISTAT
