= Bassetti =

Italian textile company

Bassetti is an Italian textile company.

It was founded in Milan in 1830 by Carlo Barboncini, as a textile emporium. In 1840, it opened a hand-weaving factory at Rescaldina, some 25 km to the north west, which employed around fifty women. Today, it forms part of the Zucchi Group, which specialises in the manufacture and distribution of household linen and whose brands include ’Zucchi‘ and ‘Bassetti’ and Mascioni In Italy.
