= Hans Leyers =

German Army officer (1896–1981)

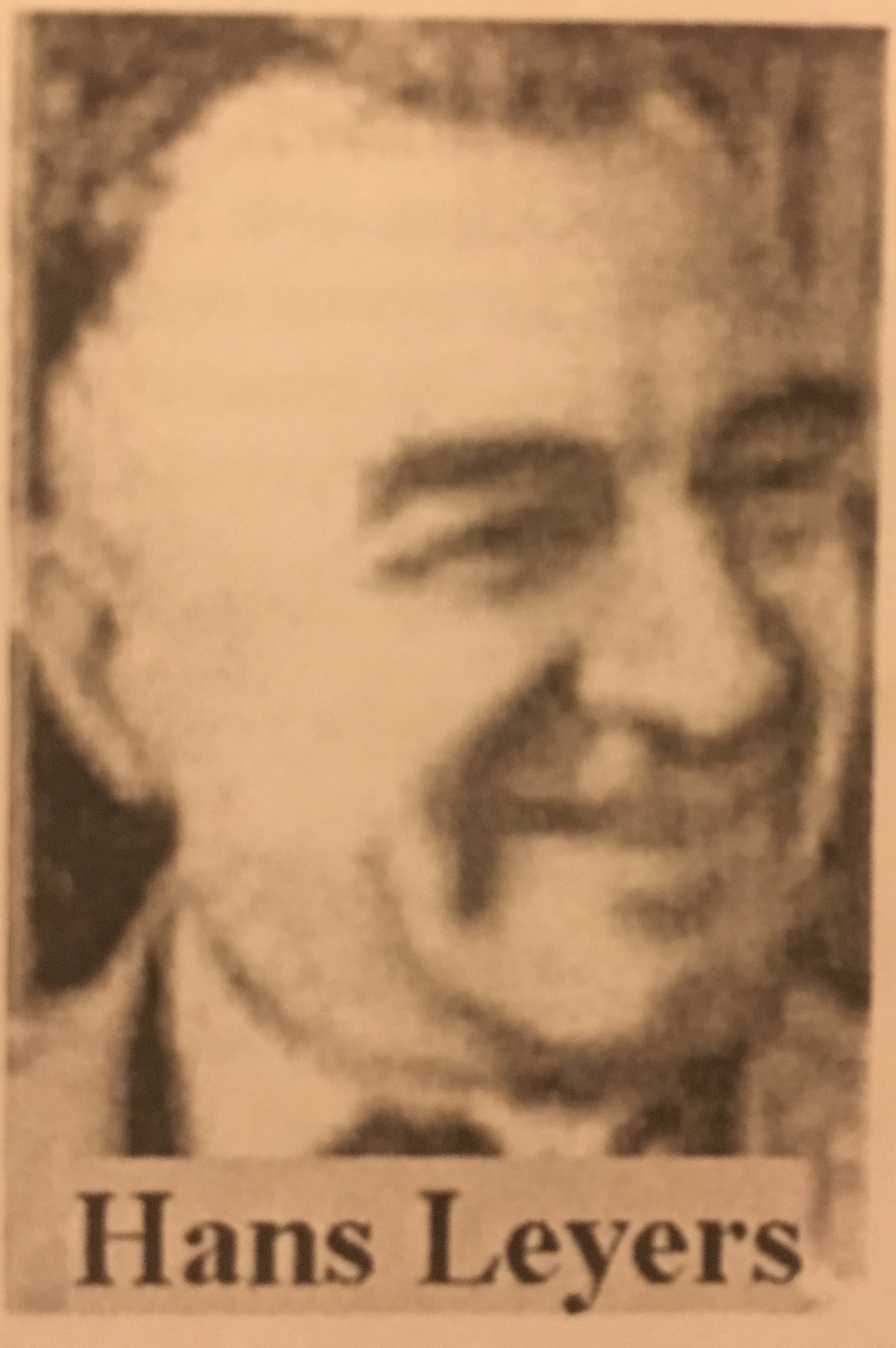
An undated image of Leyers

Hans Leyers (March 5, 1896 – February 2, 1981) was a German Army Generalmajor who, in his last assignment during World War II, served as general representative of the Ministry of Armaments and War Production of Nazi Germany in the Italian Social Republic.

== Life during the war ==
After his school days, Leyers joined the 5th Foot Artillery Regiment of the Imperial German Army as a flag cadet on March 23, 1914, where he was promoted to Leutnant on May 21, 1914. Among other things, he took part in the First World War as a regimental and battalion adjutant. Leyers was then taken over by the Reichswehr on October 1, 1919, transferred to Artillery Regiment No. 1 on October 1, 1920, and promoted to Oberleutnant there on September 1, 1922.

After another assignment from October 1925 to October 1926 in Artillery Regiment No. 6, Leyers completed his studies as a qualified engineer at the Technische Hochschule Charlottenburg (today, Technische Universität Berlin) in 1930, during which he was promoted to Hauptmann in 1928. He then received his doctorate and was taken on as a consultant in the Army Weapons Office.

On March 1, 1931, Leyers was transferred to the 1st Transport Battalion as squadron commander. With effect from July 1, 1934, Leyers completed his habilitation and returned to the Army Weapons Office, where he headed the group management for procurement measures with the rank of Major. During this time he published his only book with the title Das Fußartillerie-Bataillon Nr. 50 im Weltkriege 1914/1918, self-published with 216 pages.

After his promotion to Oberstleutnant in January 1937, Leyers was given command of the 2nd Department of Artillery Regiment No. 20 in October of the same year. He then took over management of the “Regimental Staff Artillery Regiment No. 45” on November 10, 1938. and after its renaming on November 24, 1938, the “Regimental Staff Artillery Regiment No. 116”, and was promoted to Oberst there in June 1939.

Effective May 1940, Leyers was transferred to the high command of the army as head of the weapons department in the Office Group for Industrial Armaments – Weapons and Equipment under the head of army armaments and commander of the reserve army. After his promotion to Generalmajor on January 1, 1943, he was appointed by Albert Speer on September 13, 1943, as Plenipotentiary for Italy in the Reich Ministry of Armaments and War Production. Until August 1944 he supported Friedrich Landfried and then Otto Wächter, who, as the highest representatives of the Third Reich in Italy, were in charge of the military administration in that country.

=== Work in Italy ===
Leyers's primary tasks were to place the economy of northern and central Italy at the service of the German war economy without consulting the Italian authorities, and to strategically secure these processes. During his time in charge in Italy, assets such as raw materials and heavy metals, semi-finished and finished products as well as operating and manufacturing facilities with tens of thousands of wagons and more than 1,150,000 tons of cargo for German war-related companies were removed from the country. In addition, Leyers supervised, among other things, the U-relocation of the Caproni aircraft works in Torbole, the construction of the Gothic Line, and the bunker near Marnate, which was intended as a gold repository.

While a resident of Como, Italy, in Villa Rosaco, Leyers befriended and, on multiple occasions, provided assistance to his neighbor, Ginevra (Bedetti) Masciadri (recognized by Yad Vashem as Righteous Among Nations on October 13, 2004), in direct support of her activities on behalf of the National Liberation Committee, including securing her release from San Donnino prison in Como after arrest and detention beginning on August 8, 1944.

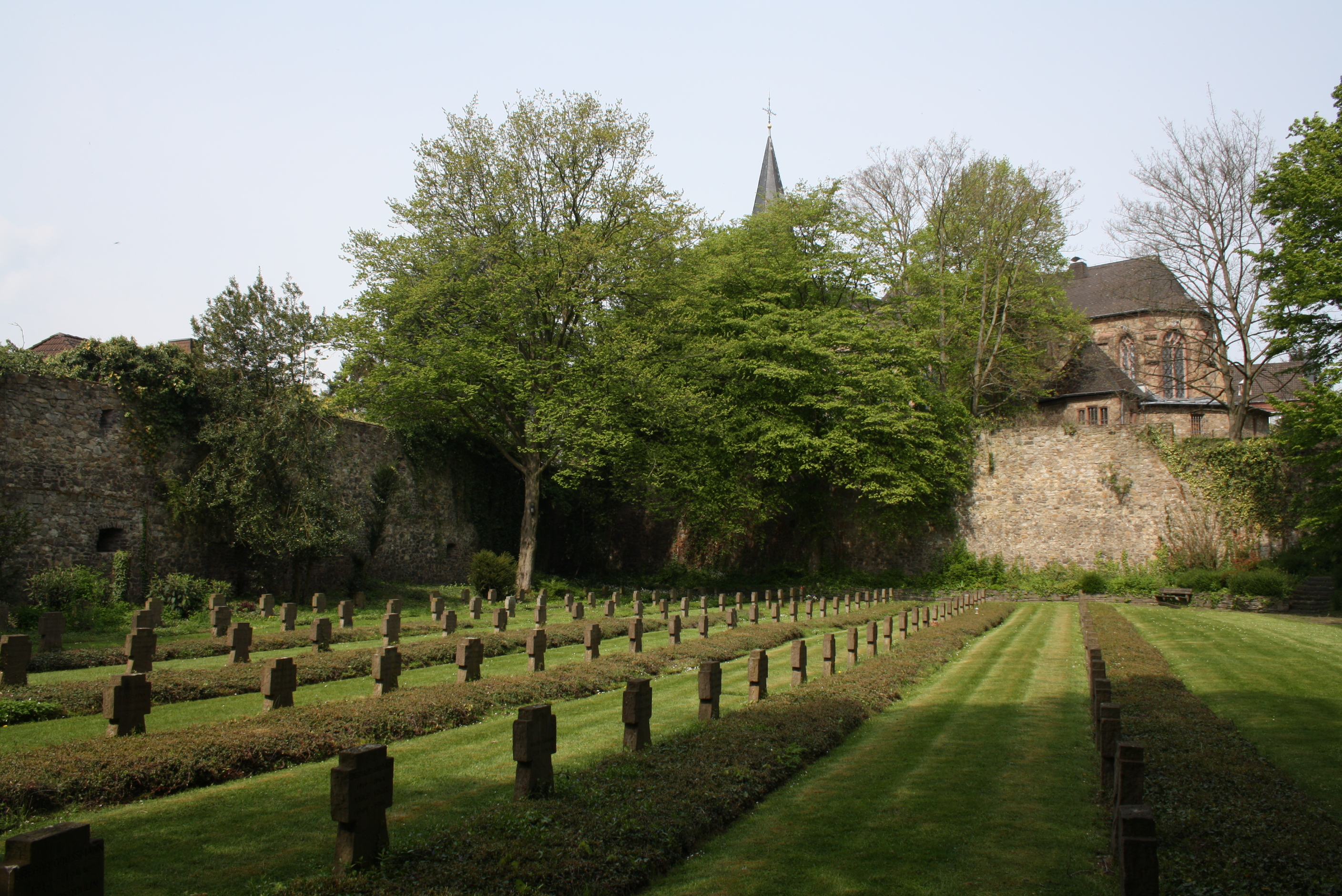
A cemetery in Weisweiler Castle, which Leyers donated to the Evangelische Kirchengemeinde Weisweiler-Dürwiß

Leyers gave Herbert von Karajan shelter in the Villa d'Este on Lake Como after the latter fled Germany on February 18, 1945, to avoid being drafted.

From 1951 Hans Layers lived with his family in Weisweiler on Haus Palant in, who contributed to the donation of the front part of Weisweiler Castle and rendering service to the independent Weisweiler parish as churchmaster in 1961 and 1971. Dr. Ing. Hans Leyers died in 1981 at the age of 84. A street in Weisweiler was named after him in 1992.

== In fiction ==
A fictionalized Hans Leyers is described in the novel Beneath a Scarlet Sky, by Mark Sullivan, as the general for whom the biographical fiction and historical fiction novel's protagonist Pino Lella is depicted as a driver and interpreter. However, researchers and historians refute the author's casting and reimagination of Leyers in the role of an antagonist in command of the Organization Todt operating group in Italy, and several details and accusations about the role of both Leyers and Organization Todt operations in Italy established as ahistorical and inauthentic, casting a shadow that a number of details in the story told by the book were fabricated by its author.
