= Rescaldina =

- Comune
- Comune di Rescaldina
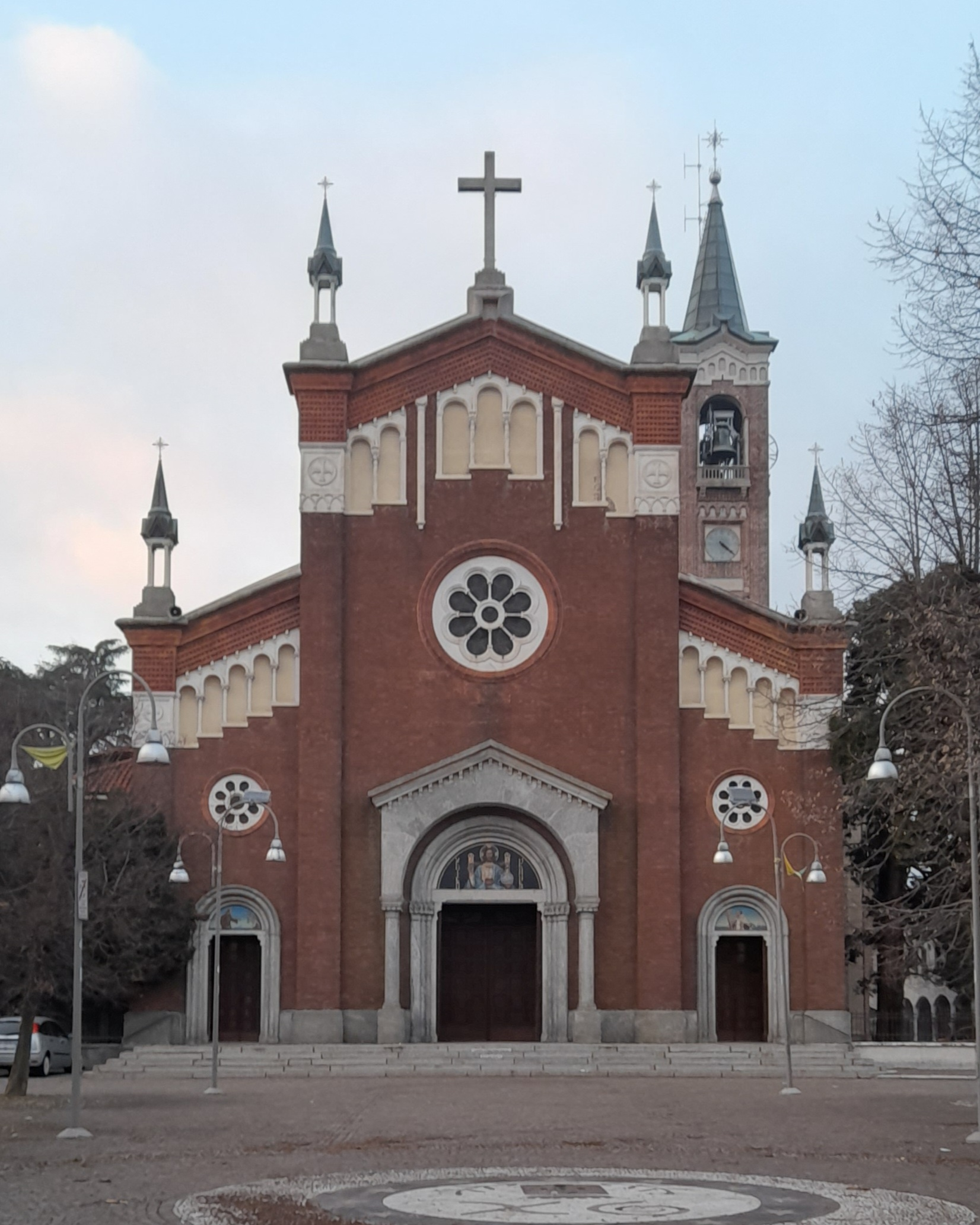
- Church of Santi Bernardo and Giuseppe

- Coat of arms

- Location within Italy Location within Lombardy
- Coordinates: 45°37′N 8°57′E
- Country: Italy
- Region: Lombardy
- Metropolitan city: Milan (MI)
- Frazioni: Ravello, Rescalda

Government
  - Mayor: Gilles Andrè Ielo (Vivere Rescaldina (left-center))

Area
  - Total: 8.03 km^{2} (3.10 sq mi)
- Elevation: 220 m (720 ft)

Population (1 January 2019)
  - Total: 14,211
  - Density: 1,770/km^{2} (4,580/sq mi)
- Demonym: Rescaldinesi
- Time zone: UTC+1 (CET)
  - Summer (DST): UTC+2 (CEST)
- Postal code: 20027
- Dialing code: 0331
- ISTAT code: 015181
- Patron saint: san Bernardo Abate
- Saint day: 20 August
- Website: Official website

Rescaldina (Italian pronunciation: [reskalˈdiːna]) is a comune (municipality) that is part of the Metropolitan City of Milan, in the Province of Milan in the Italian region Lombardy, with a population of 14,211 (as of 1 January 2019) distributed over about 8 km^{2} (3.1 sq mi), and located about 25 kilometres (16 mi) northwest of Milan.

== Geography ==
Rescaldina borders the following municipalities: Cislago, Gorla Minore, Gerenzano, Marnate, Uboldo, Castellanza, Legnano and Cerro Maggiore. Except for Legnano and Cerro Maggiore, the other municipalities belong to the Province of Varese.

The municipality counts two civil parishes (frazioni): Ravello and Rescalda.

== Population ==
Rescaldina has a total of 14,211 inhabitants with a density of 1,770/km^{2} (4,584/sq mi). The foreign inhabitants of Rescaldina have increased in number during the last decade: in 2019 the town had 1206 people having a foreign citizenship, most of them coming from east Europe, especially from Albania and Romania.

== History ==
Earliest traces of human presence in the area of the present Municipality of Rescaldina date back to the ancient Rome civilization period as demonstrated by a Roman ara (altar) found here. The ara was probably placed near the main Roman road that ran along the top of the eastern Olona river bank (Olona valley). After having stayed for several decades at the entrance of the local cemetery, the ara is now placed in the parish house courtyard.

The first rural settlement (grangia) was probably made by Cistercian monks in the middle age. Two major rural settlements grew in the area: Rescalda and Rescaldina.

Rescaldina was elevated to parish by St Charles Borromeo in 1570 and placed within the Pieve of Legnano. Rescalda inhabitants requested their parish autonomy which was refused. They reacted by self-taxing in order to sustain a priest to guide their community: the parish of Rescalda was then created in 1608 and placed within the Pieve of Busto Arsizio. This method of self-taxing to sustain their priest gave Rescalda inhabitants the right to elect their parson until the Second Vatican Council. The latest parson was elected by the community in 1959 - Rescalda had been the second last parish to exercise that right in the Diocese of Milan.

Two buildings in Rescaldina still show the coat of arms of the Visconti of Milan which support the legend of a summer hunting lodge belonging to that noble family, hence placing Rescaldina under the control of the Duchy of Milan since the 13th century. Although the legend has never been confirmed by documents, it is the basis of the city coat of arms which shows a wolf escaping from the main tower of a castle. It reminds the daring escape of a noble named Lupo da Limonta (Lupo means wolf), who was imprisoned in the tower presently located in via Roma 7, which still shows a Visconti coat of arms engraved on its walls. During the fight for power between Visconti and Sforza families, the noble prisoner was helped free by a jester named Tremacoldo, thanks to a ruse. One day Tremacoldo was admitted to a Saracen Joust, but he made it possible to be replaced by Lupo da Limonta dressed up such that no one could recognize him. When the tournament began, instead of heading towards the Saracen target, Lupo ran away.

The House of Lampugnano (or Lampugnani) has been one of the most important families who ruled Rescaldina from the 14th to the 17th century. During that period, Rescalda had a population two to three times larger than Rescaldina. The House of Melzi - based in Legnano - used to own a huge amount of land and buildings in the municipality of Rescaldina during the last centuries, such as the Casa della Curti Granda which was used as their rural residence. In 1730 the Mailänder Kataster (Milanese cadaster) showed that the majority of the Rescaldina area was shared among noble families. The 1807 census showed that Rescaldina had a population of 207 people and Rescalda a population of 630; the main occupation was agriculture. With the Italian unification Rescaldina and Rescalda were merged into the Municipality of Rescaldina as it is nowadays.

== Economy ==
Agriculture was the main occupation of the population until the late 19th century. In 1830 the textile company Bassetti was founded in Milan and in 1840 it created its first plant in the rural village of Rescaldina. The plant quickly developed and from the first decades of the 20th century the mechanization of the textile plant induced the full industrialization of the town. At present Bassetti is part of the Zucchi textile group which houses the Zucchi Collection museum in its headquarters in Rescaldina. The museum is considered to be one of the biggest collections of handblocks for printed fabrics in the world ranging from the end of the 18th century to 1930.

On 5 October 1887 the opening of the railway line Saronno-Busto Arsizio links Rescaldina to both Milan and Novara, its station being the first after Saronno towards Novara. The railway was built by FNS, then operated by Ferrovie Nord Milano (nowadays Trenord) since 1890. On 21 September 1924 the first toll highway in the world was opened, the Autostrada dei Laghi which passes by Rescaldina. Two exits on the A8 branch (Milano-Varese) directly serve Rescaldina, and the nearest exit on the A9 branch (Milano-Como Chiasso) is just 6 km away. The presence of both the railway and the highway highly contributed to the social and economical development of the town: easy commuting to Milan boosted the education and job opportunities.

At the end of the 20th century Rescaldina experienced the same changes as its wider area (Alto Milanese) i.e. from manufacturing to service industry. Although several top-class small advanced technology plants have developed, the largest increase of business is in the commercial sector with several shopping centers that take advantage of the nearby highway exits on A8 Milano-Varese (Legnano and Castellanza), and on A9 Milano-Como Chiasso (Saronno and Uboldo) which also provides quick connection to Switzerland. The railway line was doubled in the 1990s and now connects Rescaldina to Milan Malpensa Airport directly as well.
