= Holohan murder case =

Italian murder case

The Holohan murder case concerns the death of OSS Major William Holohan in Italy during the Second World War.

In September 1944, the U.S. Army's Office of Strategic Services (OSS) dispatched teams of specially trained soldiers into enemy-occupied territory to organize resistance movements. In Europe, one team was dispatched to the Como, Italy area. Its mission was code-named "Chrysler". Many of the partisan groups in Europe and Asia were overtly communist. This greatly concerned some Allied planners, since the communists could be expected to use their military power to take control of post-war government. The uprising in Paris in August 1944 was fomented by pro-communist police who were then pushed aside by forces loyal to Charles de Gaulle. In Greece, a civil war erupted between communist and anti-communist partisan forces.

== Mission Chrysler ==
On September 27, 1944, five American soldiers – mission commander Major William V. Holohan, First Lieutenant Victor Gianinno, First Lieutenant Aldo Icardi, Technical Sergeant Arthur Ciaramicoli, and radio operator Carl LoDolce – and three Italian agents parachuted into northern Italy near Coiromonte, a frazione of Armeno in the province of Novara. Holohan was a forty-year-old lawyer who had a peacetime reserve commission in the cavalry. Twenty-two-year-old Lieutenant Icardi was the only mission member able to speak the dialect of the region. Lieutenant Gianinno spoke Italian and LoDolce spoke Sicilian. Holohan was entrusted with about $16,000 worth of U.S. dollars, gold Louis d'ors, Swiss francs, and Italian lire to fund mission activities. Holohan insisted that his men wear their uniforms in accordance with OSS directives to protect against being executed as spies if captured.

The situation in northern Italy, 600 miles (1,000 km) from the Allied armies, was particularly complex. There were four major anti-fascist groups: the Socialists, Action Party, Christian Democrat, and Communist, plus smaller groups under commanders with imprecise allegiances. Originally, Mission Chrysler was to establish a show of authority and liaison in the area in anticipation of an early Axis capitulation. When this did not happen, the mission was changed to assist the partisan units with arms and supplies.

German forces went after the Chrysler men, who had several narrow escapes from anti-partisan sweeps. At one point, the Germans pinpointed the OSS transmitter to within 100 yards, but partisans intercepted three Germans and a Swiss interpreter with direction-finding gear. In December, an independent partisan leader called Cinquanta betrayed the Chrysler men to the Germans. Cinquanta was later assassinated.

== Communists ==
On December 2, 1944, Holohan sent Icardi to meet with the local communist commander, Vincenzo Moscatelli. This was reluctantly arranged by Aminta Migliari, aka Giorgio, who had wanted the arms drops funneled through him. Although Migliari proved to be treacherous, the OSS men had to rely on him for support. The communists, who made up about 75% of the partisans in the Chrysler area, were supposed to receive equal allocations of the two arms drops, but they frequently raided drops intended for rival groups. Lieutenant Icardi stated in 1950 that Holohan treated the communists equally as the other groups. Some Italians regarded Holohan as "fervently anti-Communist".

On December 6, 1944, the OSS men were holed up in Villa Castelnuovo on Lake Orta when two friendly priests came to warn them to flee. As the soldiers left in the darkness, gunfire broke out and Holohan, Icardi, LoDolce and Italian agents Gualtiero and Tozzini fired back. By prearrangement, the men would split up if attacked. Icardi made it to Giorgio's headquarters. When the men finally reunited, Holohan was missing. Icardi reported the incident to his headquarters.

Two weeks later, an OSS man from Milan visited the Lake Orta and investigated Holohan's disappearance. At the villa, the officer found spent 9mm shell casings (used by all sides) and on the beach, one of Holohan's hand grenades.

The surviving Chrysler men continued to arrange supply drops to the partisans, and Moscatelli stated later that after Holohan's death, OSS support increased. In February 1945, Mission Chrysler was ordered to Milan, but its operations changed because of the urban environment, which precluded air drops and hiding in the countryside.

== Questions ==
After the war, Holohan's brother, Joseph R. Holahan (his spelling), a stockbroker, sought to learn more about the night at Villa Castelnuovo. He wrote to the Defense Department and the Italian police, and he interviewed Icardi, by then a lawyer in Pittsburgh. In 1947, after the OSS men returned to civilian life, Icardi was interviewed by Army investigators and given a polygraph examination. Icardi offered to reenter the Army in order to submit to a court-martial and clear up any questions.

In January 1949, Italian Carabiniere Lieutenant Elio Albieri became interested in the case. When he questioned ex-partisans Tozzini and Mannini in March 1950, they told a story of Icardi becoming resentful of Holohan's refusal to support the communists and hatching a plot to murder the major. When an attempt to poison Holohan's soup failed, a toss of a coin selected LoDolce to go to Holohan's room, where LoDolce shot him twice in the head. The Italians stuffed Holohan's body into a sleeping bag and then dumped it into the lake. The men assisted the Italian police in recovering the body, which was identified as Holohan's. The skull showed two bullet wounds.

On August 3, 1950, former Sergeant Carl G. LoDolce gave a statement to Army CID (Criminal Investigative Division) in Rochester, New York. LoDolce alleged that he and former Lieutenant Aldo Icardi, both members of Holohan's team, had killed Holohan in a dispute over providing aid to communist partisans. The members of the mission had drawn lots to see who would kill Holohan.

Another former OSS sergeant who served on Chrysler, Arthur P. Ciaramicoli, declared the allegations "silly." As for feelings towards Holohan, Ciaramicoli told a reporter, "We all didn't particularly like the major. He was older than the rest of us and was content to sit back and take things easy. He endangered our lives on several occasions by his attitude".

Icardi denied involvement in Holohan's death, and LoDolce repudiated the press accounts of his involvement in murder taken by the CID investigator. Former partisan leader Vincenzo Moscatelli, by now a senator in the Italian Parliament, told reporters that Holohan had an "anti-Communist attitude" and described Icardi as a "valiant soldier who helped greatly in the partisan struggle against the Germans." True magazine Rome correspondent Michael Stern published an article based on the Italian case, and Time magazine also adopted the Italian version in its coverage. The New York Times published a lengthy statement by Icardi given to the Pittsburgh Press.

== Trial in absentia ==
In the fall of 1951, the Italian government charged Icardi and LoDolce with murder and tried to have them extradited to Italy, but U.S. judges denied the extradition requests. Icardi and LoDolce were outside the jurisdiction of U.S. military authorities because they had been discharged, and U.S. courts had no jurisdiction over offenses committed in Italy. The judge in Icardi’s case refused the request to extradite him because at the time of the alleged crime, the Italian government did not have control over the area of the offense. In their rulings, however, the judges accepted the Italian version of events.

In 1953, the two Americans were tried for murder in absentia in Novara, Italy, along with former partisans "Giorgio" Migliari, Giuseppa Mannini, and Gualtieri Tozzini. The Italians testified to having helped plan murder of Holohan, who was poisoned and shot by LoDolce on Icardi's orders in order to divert more arms to the communists and to acquire between $45,000 and $150,000 (far more than the actual funds involved) that Holohan had for covert operations. They said that Holohan was "sentenced to death" as a "traitor".

Migliari testified that he and Icardi each invested $75,000 in Italian lire in a toy factory, the money coming from commissions paid by Holohan to get favorable exchange rates on the mission's funds. Some witnesses accused Icardi of living a lavish lifestyle and that Icardi had murdered Holohan on the orders of superiors, while others complimented Icardi's honesty and courage. When Senator Moscatelli was asked if Icardi was a communist, the former partisan leader said, "How could he be if he is still a member of the United States Intelligence Service?"

Although Icardi and LoDolce were absent, they had a lawyer who told the court that Major Holohan had to be eliminated "as an obstacle in the fight for victory."

The Italians (who spent three years in jail) were acquitted by the judges who felt that the partisans acted "out of necessity" and were following orders. The Americans were convicted in absentia of murder. Icardi was sentenced to life imprisonment and LoDolce was sentenced to 17 years. Since neither man could be forced to go to Italy, neither served time.

== Committee investigation ==
The U.S. Congress then entered the story after Joseph Holahan joined the staff of the House Armed Services Committee. On March 26, 1953, a two-man subcommittee, including Chairman W. Sterling Cole, traveled to Pittsburgh and interviewed Icardi, who denied the murder charges. On August 29, 1955, Icardi was indicted by a federal grand jury for eight counts of perjury.

The trial began on April 17, 1956. The prosecution had 18 Italian witnesses flown in and ready to testify. Icardi's defense attorney, Edward Bennett Williams, argued in his opening statement that Holohan had been killed on the orders of communist partisan leader Moscatelli, the attack having been staged by Moscatelli’s men. Williams claimed he had gone to Italy with a former FBI agent and interviewed Senator Moscatelli, who freely admitted that he had arranged for Holohan's death, seeing the man as an impediment to the success of his partisans. Icardi had no involvement in the killing. However, the factual truth of this account was never examined by the court, as the trial ultimately hinged on a question of legal procedure.

With Congressman Cole on the stand, Williams pressed him to admit that he had discussed the intent of getting a perjury charge against Icardi before the interview. Williams thus moved that the case be dismissed, because there had been no valid legislative purpose in the interrogations of Icardi to begin with, only "a hearing for the sake of headlines".

On April 29, 1956, Judge Richmond B. Keech handed down a directed verdict of acquittal on the perjury charges, citing the defense argument that there was no valid legislative purpose to Icardi's testimony before the subcommittee and the perjury charge could not stand. Keech strongly rebuked the conduct Cole's subcommittee, stating that "at the time the subcommittee questioned the defendant Icardi it was not functioning as a competent tribunal." Icardi wept at the verdict, clinging to his lawyer.

General William "Wild Bill" Donovan who led OSS efforts in World War II commented following the outcome of the Committee's investigation, "If you ask me what kind of soldier Aldo Icardi was, I'd say he was gallant. If you asked me what kind of job he did for us, I'd say he did one of the best jobs of any operative we had".

== Bibliography ==
- Icardi, Aldo; American Master Spy, University Books, New York, 1956
- Roosevelt, Kermit; War Report of the OSS, Volume 2, The Overseas Targets, Walker and Company, New York, 1976
- United States. Congress. House. Committee on Armed Services. "Testimony and confessions relating to the disappearance of Maj. William V. Holohan : hearings before the Special Subcommittee of the Committee on Armed Services, House of Representatives under authority of H. Res. 125, 83d Congress, 1st session". 1953
- United States. Congress. House. Committee on Armed Services., "Full committee hearing on miscellaneous acquisition and disposal projects and H.R. 2842, H.R. 6025, and H.R. 1245, and report on murder of Maj. William V. Holohan", 1953
- United States National Archives and Records Administration (NARA II), College Park, Maryland, Record Group RG226 Office of Strategic Services (OSS), Entry 124, Box 30 Folder 235, declassified archival documents, CHRYSLER, Fol. 12 - Mission in Province of Novara (headed by Maj. William Holohan, killed in the field) to work with Partisans and establish network; mission report; debriefing reports; contracts; salaries; press report of House Armed Services Committee investigation of Holohan's death, May 1945-June 1948.
- Williams, Edward Bennett (1962). One Man's Freedom. New York City: Atheneum.

== Sources ==
- "Icardi Denies He Helped Murder Maj. Holohan Behind Nazi Lines," The New York Times, August 16, 1951, p. 12;
- "LoDolce Disowns His ‘Confession’," Ibid., August 18, 1951, p. 4;
- "Murder Charges Scorned by Icardi," Ibid., August 19, 1951, p. 4;
- "Ruling on LoDolce Bars Extradition," Ibid., August 12, 1952, p. 1;
- "Case Dismissed," Ibid., August 17, 1952, p. E2;
- "Holohan Suspect Called U.S. Agent," Ibid., October 21, 1952, p. 19;
- "Woman Says Icardi Sought Her Death," Ibid., October 22, 1953, p. 16;
- "Italian Describes Icardi as Playboy," Ibid., October 23, 1953, p. 9;
- "Woman Says Icardi Did Not Need Cash," Ibid., October 24, 1953, 9;
- "Icardi Called Gangster," Ibid., October 29, 1953, p. 3;
- "Icardi Motive Defended," Ibid., November 6, 1953, p. 10;
- "The Holohan Murder," Ibid., November 8, 1953, p. E2;
- "Icardi Indicted for Perjury in O.S.S. Killing of Major," Ibid., August 30, 1955, p. 1;
- "Holohan Slaying Called Red Coup," Ibid., August 18, 1956, p. 16;
- "U.S. Court Acquits Icardi; Defines Limits on Inquiries," Ibid., April 20, 1956, p. 1;
- "Icardi and the Law," Ibid., April 22, 1956, p. 192;
- "The Case of the Missing Major," Time, August 27, 1951;
- "The Unpunishable Crime," Ibid., August 25, 1952;
- "Congress Off Limits," Ibid., April 30, 1956;
- "Pathologist’s Report," Ibid., November 19, 1956.
