= Cinque Vette Park =

Natural park in Lombardy, Italy

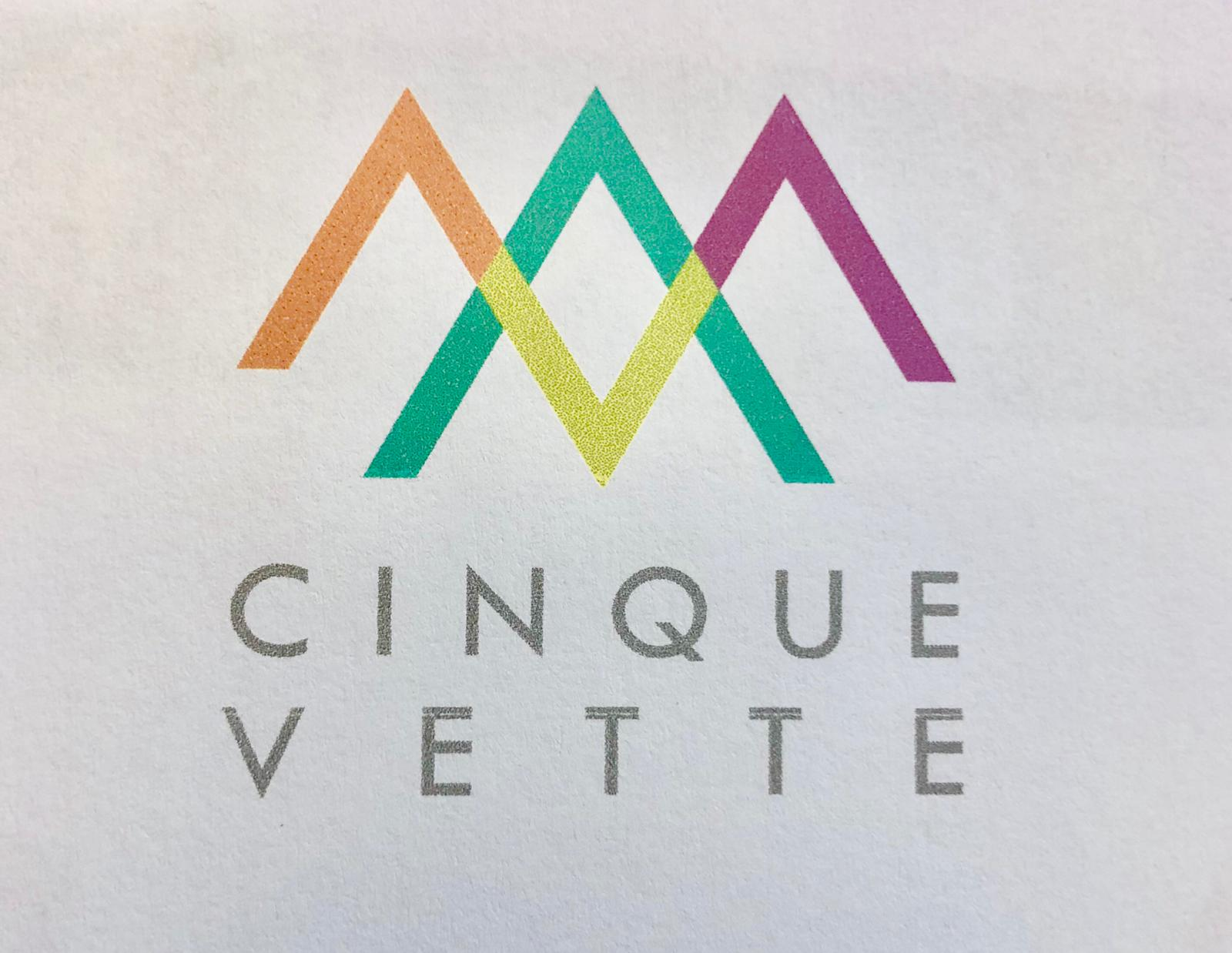
- Logo of the Cinque Vette Park

- Location within Lombardy Location within Italy
- Type: Natural Area
- Nearest city: Varese
- Coordinates: 45°56′12.6″N 08°52′01.4″E
- Area: 14 kilometres (8.7 mi)
- Created: 2017
- Operator: Comunità Montana del Piambello
- Website: http://5vette.it/

The Cinque Vette Park is a natural park, established by the Region of Lombardy on 19 June 2017. The park is located in the north-eastern part of the Province of Varese, in the Italian region of Lombardy. It takes the name from the main geographic features located in the park, the five mountain peaks. The project was launched with the aim of the three local councils of (Cuasso al Monte, Marzio, and Valganna) to preserve a green area and make it available for touristic-sportive-cultural initiatives above 500 meters of altitude. The primary goal of the park is to encourage the discovery of the natural features of the north-eastern part of Varese, which offers panoramic view points and preserves historical aspects such as: the remains of the Cadorna Line; the ruins of the Castle of Cuasso al Monte; the Artistic village of Boarezzo; the Saint Gemolo Abbey; the Alpine Village of Mount Piambello; and, the Hospital of Cuasso Al Monte.

== Location ==
The Cinque Vette Park is situated within the domain of the Varese Prealps, the western section of the Lugano Prealps. It covers an area of 14 kilometers squared and it comprises the councils (comuni) of Cuasso al Monte, Marzio, and Valganna, all located within the Province of Varese. Approximately 85% of the park territory belongs to the council of Cuasso al Monte, 15% to the council of Valganna and 5% to the council of Marzio. The park features a variety of panoramic views and natural landscapes. The park is sponsored by Lega Italiana Protezione Uccelli. The surrounding area hosts important habitats and ecosystems, and for that reason it has become part of the Life TIB project, which includes the natural corridor that links the Alps and the Po Valley.

The park includes Lake Ghirla, Lake Ganna, and the Laghetto di Cavagnano. The last is a protected site (as Lake Ganna) due to the rare and endangered autochthonous fauna that inhabits the water. Adjacent to the park are Lake Maggiore and Lake Lugano.

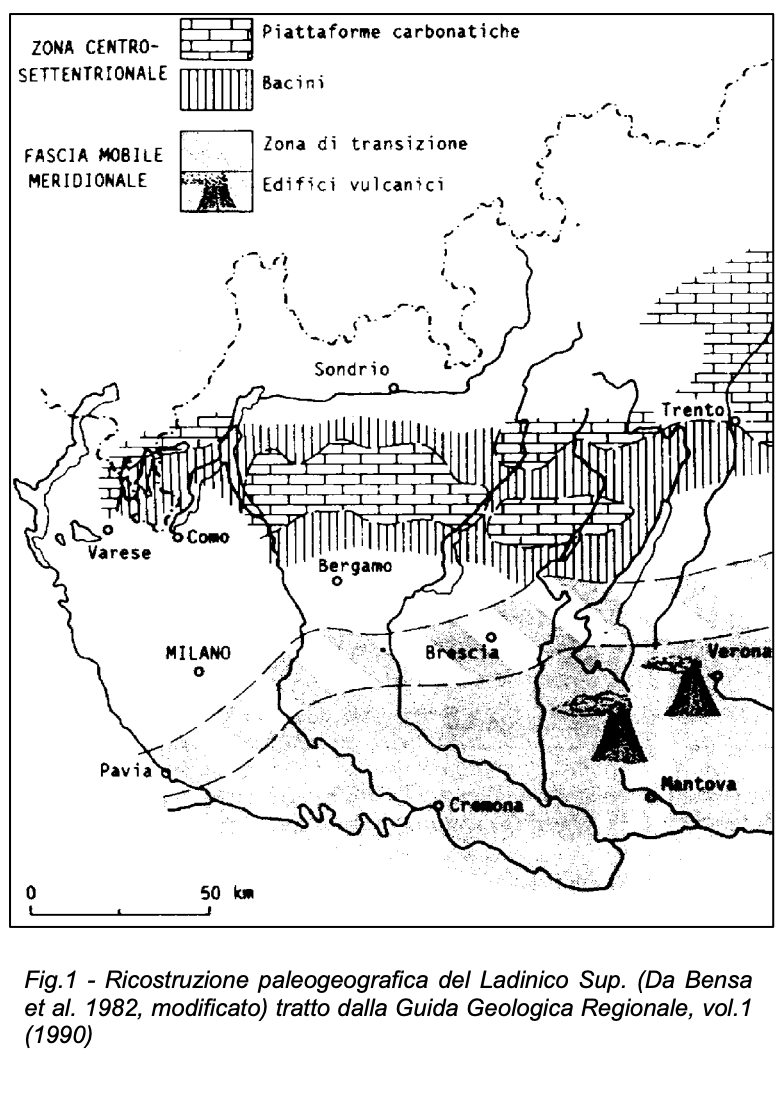
Picture of geological aspects of the region of Lombardy

=== Geological aspects ===
The territory of the park is classified as part of the Varesine Prealps, which are geologically significant and linked to the evolution of the Alpine Chain, which today appears as one complex structure with recognizable framed polyphasic tectonics deformations in the Plate tectonics model. The area of Mount Piambello is characterized by the presence of silicate rocks that originated about 290 million years ago from the multiple volcanic eruptions that took place in this area. In Valganna there are also deposits of travertine rock, locally called "Travertino della Valganna".

=== Climatic aspects ===
The park is located in an area characterized by high rainfall values, with strong variability in rainfall from one year to the next. From an analysis of the "isoiete" trend (closed curves that indicate areas affected by the same amount of precipitation), carried out between the years 1921 and 1972, a regular increase of the tendency of regional rainfall starting from the southernmost to the northernmost areas has been observed.
This is determined by the influence caused by the mountain ranges belonging to the Alpine arc, and by the influence brought by the Lake Maggiore, located a few kilometers West.

== History ==
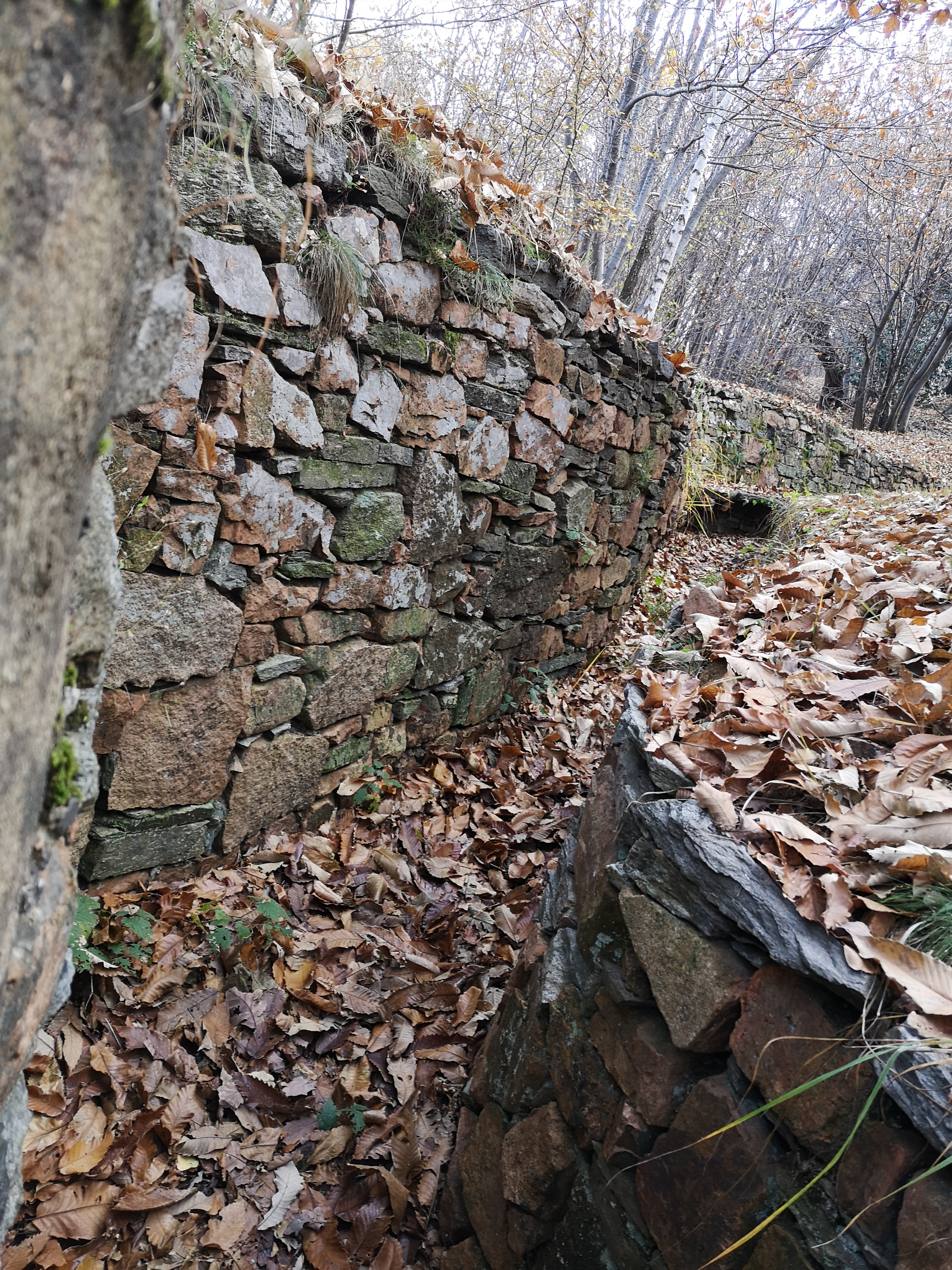
Trench at Punta Paradiso (Autumn 2020)

Several historic settlements have been identified in the park, some dated back to the prehistoric period. An old brewery, an example of the Liberty Architecture, is also located within the Cinque Vette Park. The area gained relevancy before and during the First World War, because a line of forts, bunkers and trenches, originally named the Great North Frontier, was built through the park area. The building of the North Frontier began in 1862. It aimed at protecting the Italian Kingdom and especially the cities of Milan, Turin, Brescia, and Genoa (the port of Genoa, along with these other cities, was the main focal point for the Italian commerce and economy) from possible Swiss, German and Austrian invasions. The name of the fortification derives from the army general Luigi Cadorna, who supported the need and followed its construction during World War I. The main purpose of the Great North Frontier was defending the Italian territories from the attack of the Austrians, who had been in conflict with the northern Italian populations before, as in the Battle of Magenta. It involved a labor force of 40 thousand workers and hundreds of millions of old Italian Lira. None of these forts and war facilities were actually involved in a battle until World War II. The steel and cement line, later regarded by the historians as the Italian Maginot Line, is now become a peaceful and family friendly trail of the Cinque Vette Park, indicated by its name: the "Sentiero di Pace", literally "Trail of Peace".

Both Protezione Civile di Cuasso al Monte and Comune di Marzio have worked to preserve the historical heritage linked to the park area: one by restoring the First World War forts of the Cadorna Line, the other by creating an information point to educate the public on all the forts built. The info point of the path "La linea Cadorna - Sentiero della Pace" is located in the council of Marzio.

=== Castle of Cuasso Al Monte (ruin) ===
The castle dates back to the High middle age and was built in a strategic spot from which it was possible to control the entire area. It was also pivotal in the thirteenth-century conflict between Guelphs and Ghibellines. After the Duke of Milan obtained it, its traces were completely lost for many years. Its original structure and builders are not known. A few years ago, at the end of a small excavation campaign conducted by some local historians, it emerged that its layout is so unusual that only two similar buildings have been discovered: the now disappeared castle of Trecate and Warkworth Castle, in the northern English county of Northumberland. Before the outbreak of the First World War, General Luigi Cadorna decided to incorporate the ruin of the castle within the Cadorna Line.

=== Cross of Mount Poncione ===
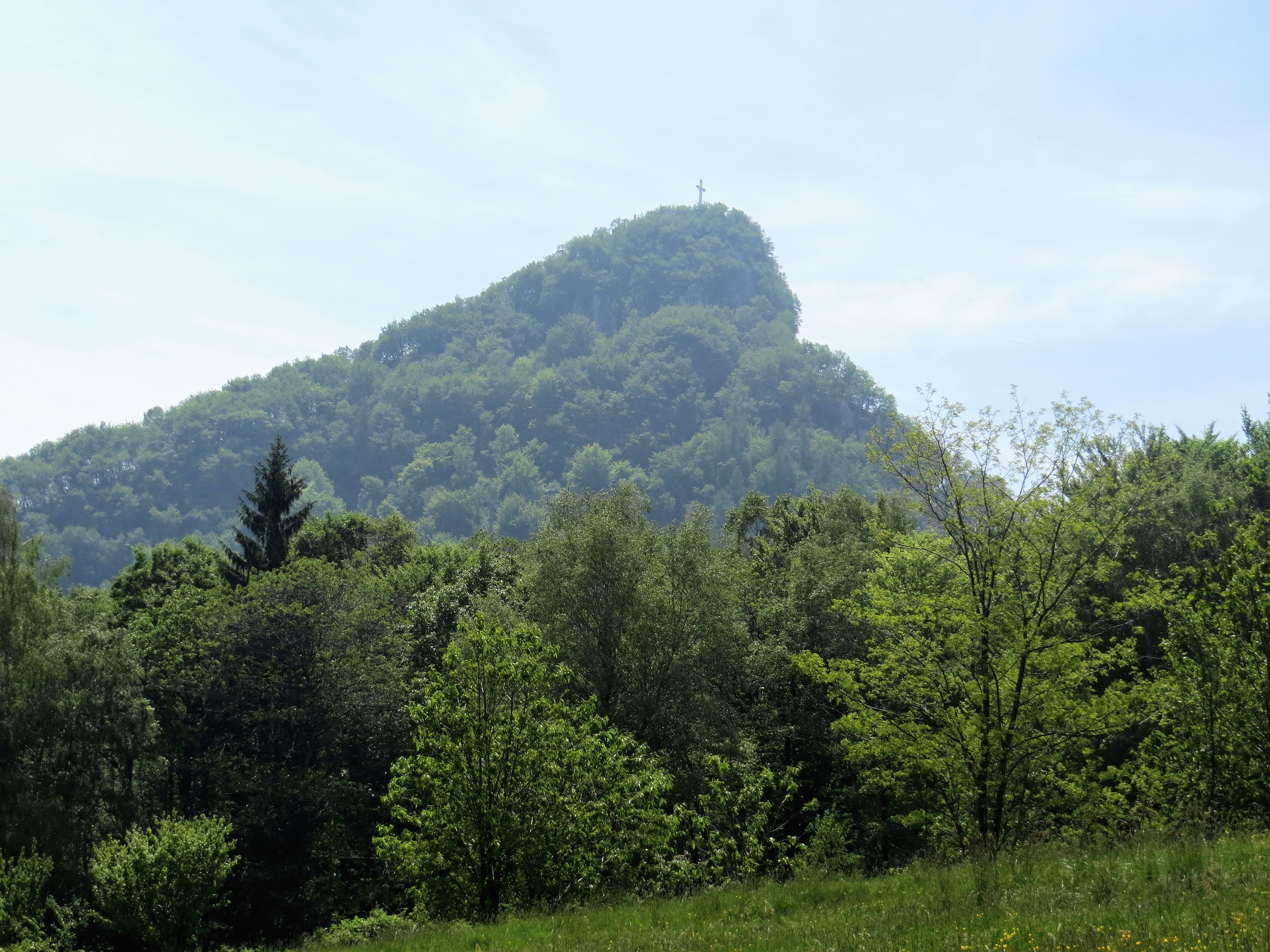
Cross of mount Poncione seen from Alpe Tedesco

On the Poncione peak stands a nine meter tall iron cross that was placed there on 4 April 1954. Don Enrico Borghi had it manufactured in 1914 with the intention to have it put on top of Mount Poncione, but the then owner of the mount denied it. Instead the big cross was placed by the Lourdes Cave and remained there until 1954, when the cave had to be restored and the cross had to be moved. In memory of Don Borghi the project was finally carried out, and in 1954 the cross was placed on top of Mount Poncione, after the new owner allowed its installation. Cement, iron, water and sand were transported up to the Alpe Tedesco with a minivan and then carried by hand to the top of the mount to build the base of the cross. Renovation operations were made in 1979 to commemorate the cross's 25th anniversary, and again in 2004 to mark the 50th anniversary. In 1979 the cross was covered in a particular variety of glass and in 2004 donkeys were used by the volunteers to carry the materials uphill.

=== The trade route of Mount Piambello ===
The Mount Piambello, located in the park, is believed by historians to be located on a trade route that once linked the two important commercial centers of Milan and Switzerland, connecting the Varese Fair, the livestock Fair of Angera, and the marketplaces of Como, Sesto Calende and Luino. Archeological evidence for this includes extant portions of the old road stone pavement, and a study of the morphology and toponymy of the area.

=== The artistic village of Boarezzo ===
Boarezzo, frazione of Valganna, is an artistic village located within the Cinque Vette Park. This small mountain village is surrounded by vegetation, extensive views and noted for its tranquility. Boarezzo had been a popular tourist destination since the early twentieth century, but had declined as visits decreased and farming activity was progressively abandoned. At the initiative of the painter Mario Alioli, an artistic concept was developed to stop the village's progressive decay by developing Boarezzo's artistic heritage. In the 1980s Aioli and the Pro Loco of Valganna began considering the idea of creating a "borgo dipinto" (in Italian literally "painted village"), in order to attract tourists and restore Boarezzo's lost vitality. Both Aioli and the Pro Loco gathered sixteen painters to represent that rural society using its own traditional crafts, that were slowly disappearing, displaying their paintings on the walls of the village houses. The artistic village was dedicated to two important sculptors: Giuseppe Grandi and Odoardo Tabacchi. Subsequently, an association was founded with the aim of fostering Aioli's initiative and preserve it over time. In 2008 the Association celebrated its twentieth anniversary with two new panels by Mario Alioli and Sergio Colombo which are now hanging in the ancient wash-house of the village.

=== Saint Gemolo Abbey ===
The abbey, found in Valganna, was constructed in 1095 and consecrated in 1160. Saint Gemolo's Abbey is famous for being a place of worship in memory of the martyr Saint Gemolo. The structure of the abbey is based around the cloister, which has an unusual pentagonal shape, considered in Roman times the fortified heart of the abbey. The complex also includes a church, a bell tower, housing for its monks and a guest house. During the Middle Ages, due to its architecture and strategic position, it was considered to be a safe shelter for pilgrims. In 1511 the Swiss army penetrated the area, sacking and destroying the structure; immediately afterwards the monks rebuilt the abbey, adding two chapels on the side of the complex. Today the abbey is open for tourists and has two museums: The museum of Saint Gemolo's abbey and the museum of ceramics. In addition to the museums and historical complex, the abbey is also the location of artistic and cultural events. The abbey is the subject of studies by the Association and Province of Varese.

=== The alpine village of Mount Piambello ===
The Alpine Village of Mount Piambello is located at 1000 meters above sea level and is the result of a pro bono initiative by the Italian Touring Club (TCI, at the time called "Consociazione Turistica Italiana") to help of orphans from the First World War. The creator was Luigi Vittorio Bertarelli. The costs and the land were given by donations of benefactors and members of the TCI. The latter fund-raised 1 million of old Italian liras to support the Italian army after the devastating defeat of at the Battle of Caporetto, which took place on 19 November 1917 near Caporetto, causing an enormous loss of lives. As a consequence, ₤70,000 in funds were used to create the small village to host the orphans during summer and winter holidays, for two months per year. The project plan was to create a village in a rural location, surrounded by vegetation and at an elevated height, so that the children could experience contact with nature. The children had the chance to enjoy outdoor activities, such as hiking in the several mountains in the park, and in winter to experience skiing and sledging. The village included a cafeteria, a small church, dorms and a hospital. The first fifty guests were from Milan, arriving on 14 July 1921, accompanied by a staff mostly made up of women who volunteered to look after them. In 1922, further donations provided the children with a garden, a cowshed, electricity, showers with running water, and a laundry service. Further works to extend the village took place in 1928, when the second aqueduct and a school were established. The children were not only offered recreational activities but also elementary school education. The Alpine Village of Mount Piambello remained active until the 1980s, hosting a total of 12,000 children. It is currently shut down, and not maintained by any custodians. Recently, the TCI has declared its intention to sell the village at a value of €1.5 million.

=== Cuasso al Monte Hospital ===
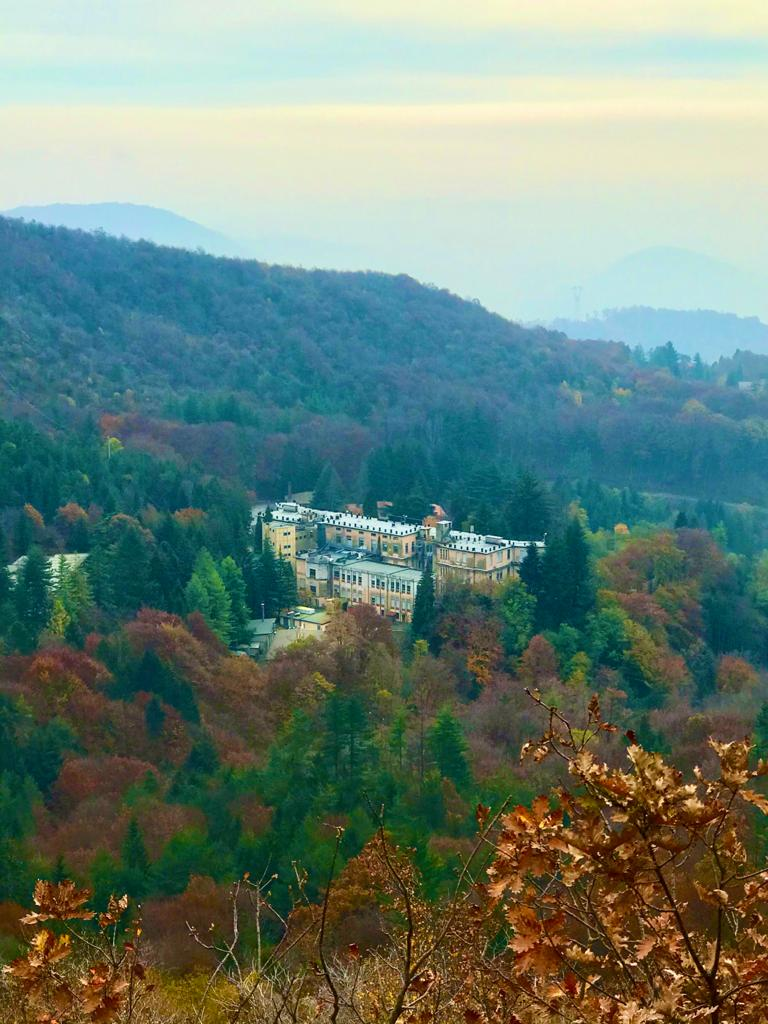
Hospital of Cuasso al monte viewed from Mount Piambello

This hospital is located within the park, precisely at 733 meters of altitude. The building dates back to the first half of the 1600s when the religious congregation of the Carmelitani Scalzi chose this place, called "desert", to build a convent. At the beginning of the 19th century, the Italian Red Cross of Milan turned the building into the headquarter of the Sanatorium Institute for lung diseases. In 1971 it was established as a hospital and in 1981 it passed to the USSL 4 of Arcisate. The hospital was subsequently converted in to a rehabilitation facility that accommodates two areas of specialist rehabilitation, neurology and pulmonology. Each ward includes rehabilitation activities and related services. At the beginning of March 2020 the ASST Sette Laghi (Territorial Healthcare Company) identified the Cuasso Hospital as a facility intended to accommodate COVID-19 patients from all over the region who are recovering from the acute phase of the disease, or who require further monitoring. The facility was set up in two weeks and it was totally converted by its technical office.

== The five main peaks ==
The five main Peaks range from 785 meters (Mount Derta), to 1159 meters (Mount Piambello).

=== Mount Piambello ===
Mount Piambello is situated in the heart of the park area, south of the small town of Marzio. This mountain is composed of volcanic rocks and, standing 1159 meters above sea level, dominates the Valceresio, Valganna and Valmarchirolo. From its summit there is a view of the Italian and Swiss Alps, up to the Monte Viso. It is characterized by an extremely varied landscape, in which wide valleys shaped by glaciers alternate with soft pre-alpine hills and numerous waterways. This mountain is of geological interest due to the Peculiarity of Sass di Bol (m.a.s.l. 982 ), a large Monolith in red Porphyry (geology). Steps carved in this huge boulder provide visitors access to reach the panoramic top.

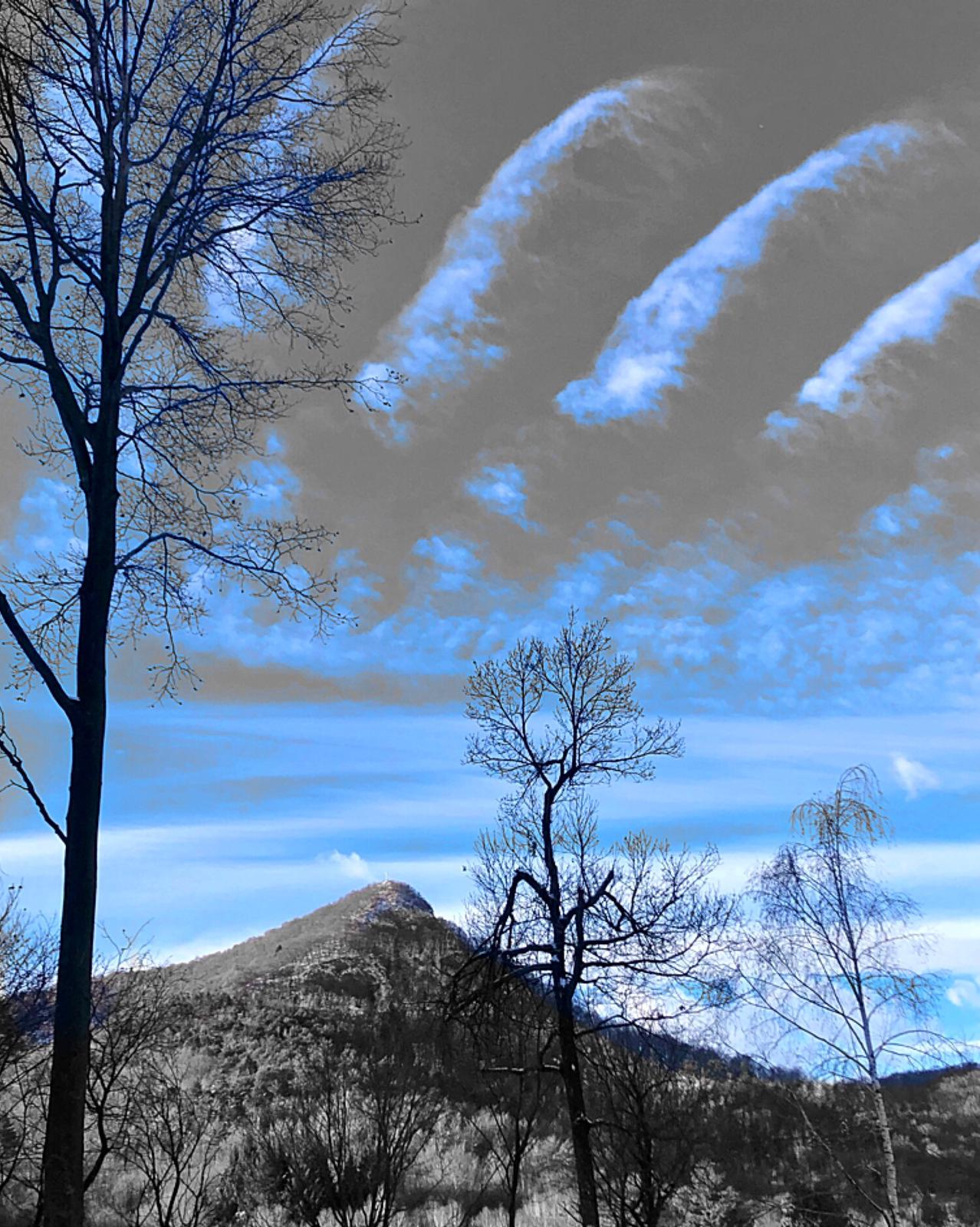
View of the Mount Poncione from Mount Piambello

=== Mount Poncione ===
Mount Poncione di Ganna is shaped as a pyramid and is 993 meters high. It appears as a wild spur detached from the ridge line that goes from Mount Monarco to Mount Piambello, descending steeply to Alpe Tedesco, with steep walls that border the Valganna valley. In the north-eastern part, steep woods descend towards Alpe Tedesco, whereas on the southern side a gentle crest connects it to the slightly higher Mount Minisfreddo. From the top of Mount Poncione the view includes: the Valganna (Ganna Valley); the Ganna and Ghirla lakes; Campo dei Fiori di Varese; the lakes of the Varesotto (Lake Varese; Lago di Monate and Lago di Comabbio); Mount Martica; the Valceresio (Ceresio Valley); the Lugano Lake; Mount Minisfreddo; Mount San Giorgio; Mount Generoso; Mount Rosa; the Lepontine Alps and the Retiche Alps.

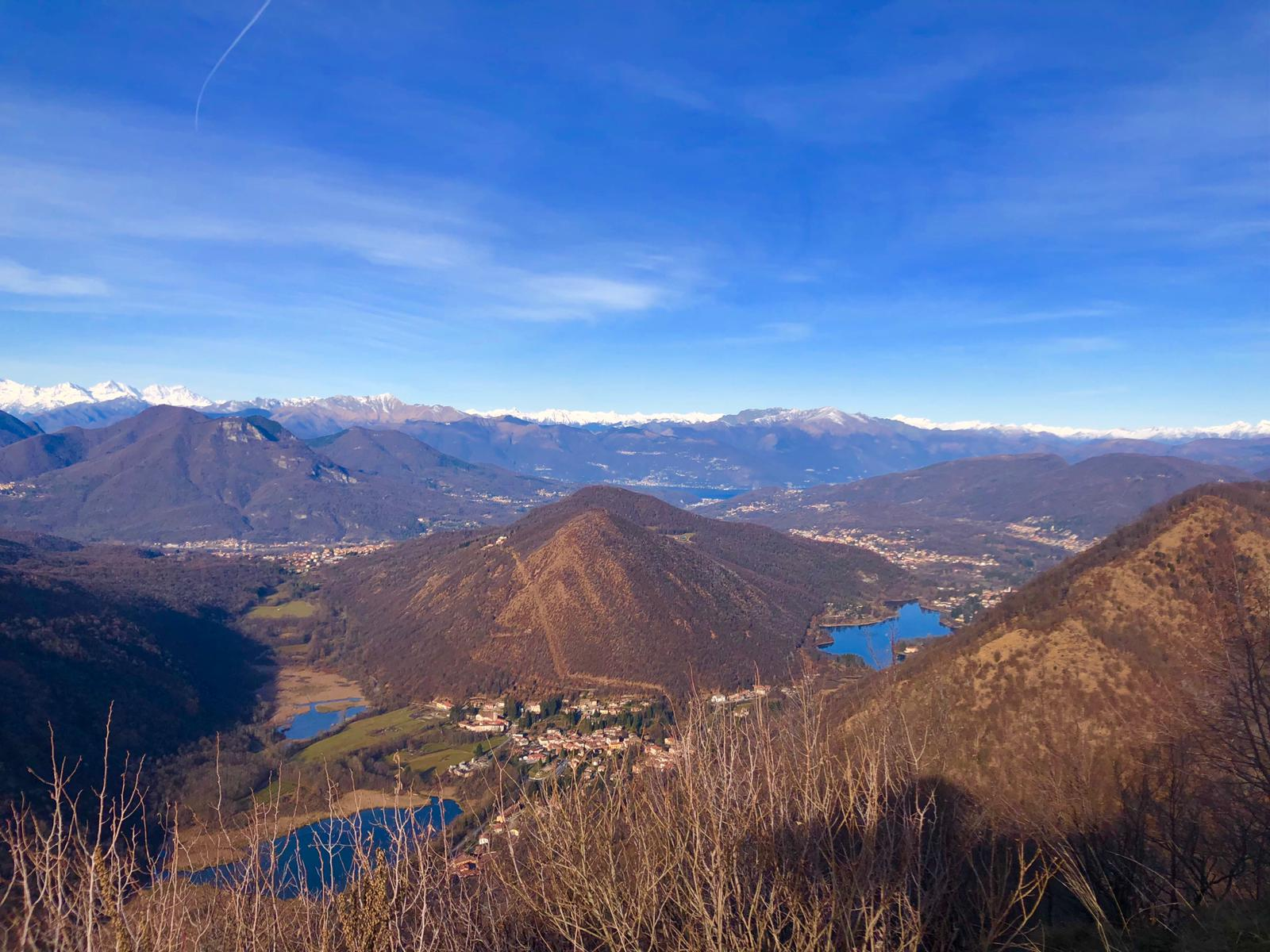
View of the Ghirla and Ganna Lakes from Mount Val de'Corni

=== Val de'Corni ===
Mount Val de'Corni is a wide undulating ridge with the highest point at 993 meters and has a prominence of 45 meters. Although it is squeezed between Mount Poncione and Mount Piambello, this mountain has several points of interest, especially for the presence of many curious porphyry, similar to those of Monte Martica on the other side of the valley. The peak does not offer particular attractions since it is completely obstructed by vegetation. The ridge forms the watershed between the Valganna and the Cavalizza valley offering extensive views of the western Alps, the Monte Generoso area, and the mountains of the Province of Como and Province of Lecco to the east.

=== Mount Marzio ===
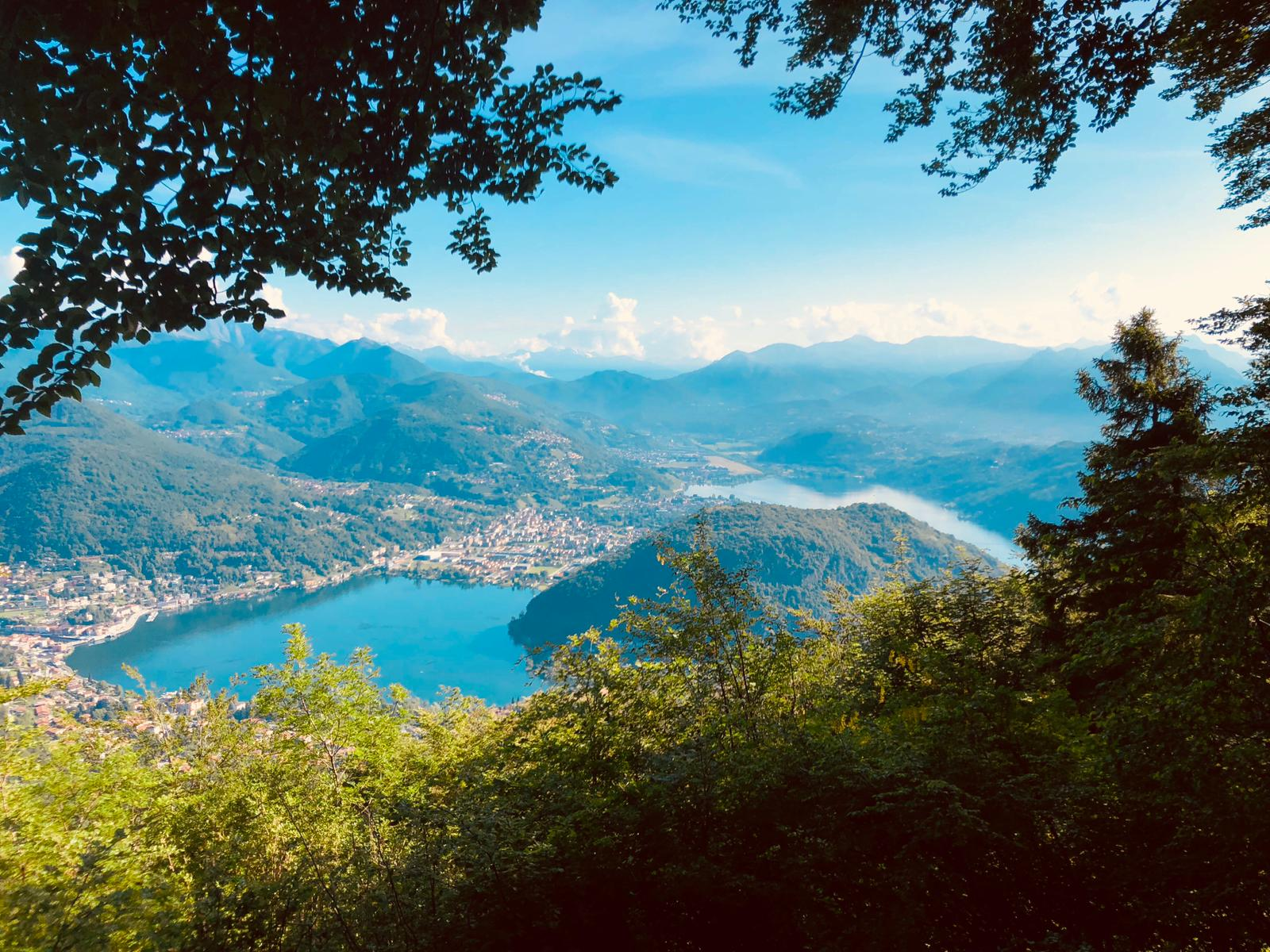
View of Ponte Tresa and Lake Lugano from Mount Marzio

Mount Marzio is 878 meters high and on its moraine ridge sits the little Council of Marzio. From the top of the mountain, it is possible to see Switzerland and Lake Lugano. The summit is accessible from two points of the village, the first one is immediately after the Madonna degli Alpini monument, the other is situated after Via Bolchini. It takes about one hour to get to the top of the peak. Remains of the trenches of the Cadorna Line are visible along this path. On the top there are some antennas and two flat areas, and from one of these there is a viewpoint over Lake Lugano. A geological fracture named "faglia di Marzio" sections the valley from north-west and separates Mount Marzio from Mount Derta and Mount Piambello. While Mount Derta and Mount Piambello are mainly made up of red porphyry and quartz, Mount Marzio is mainly composed of limestone of sedimentary origin.

=== Mount Derta ===
The Mount Derta is 785 meters high and is situated in the eastern part of the council of Marzio. The main path to reach the summi starts from the end of Via Porto Ceresio (Marzio). It takes about one hour to get to the top of the mountain. The trenches of the Cadorna Line on the top of the Mount are still visible, although they are in poor condition. The path that passes through the remains of the Cadorna Line is well maintained, as are some of the bunkers, galleries and trenches. Following the trail it is possible to reach a panoramic spot, "Sasso Paradiso", from which it is possible to see the Lugano Prealps and the Lake Lugano.

== Lakes ==
The territory of the park also includes several lakes, the most important ones being the Ghirla Lake and the Ganna Lake.

=== Ghirla Lake ===
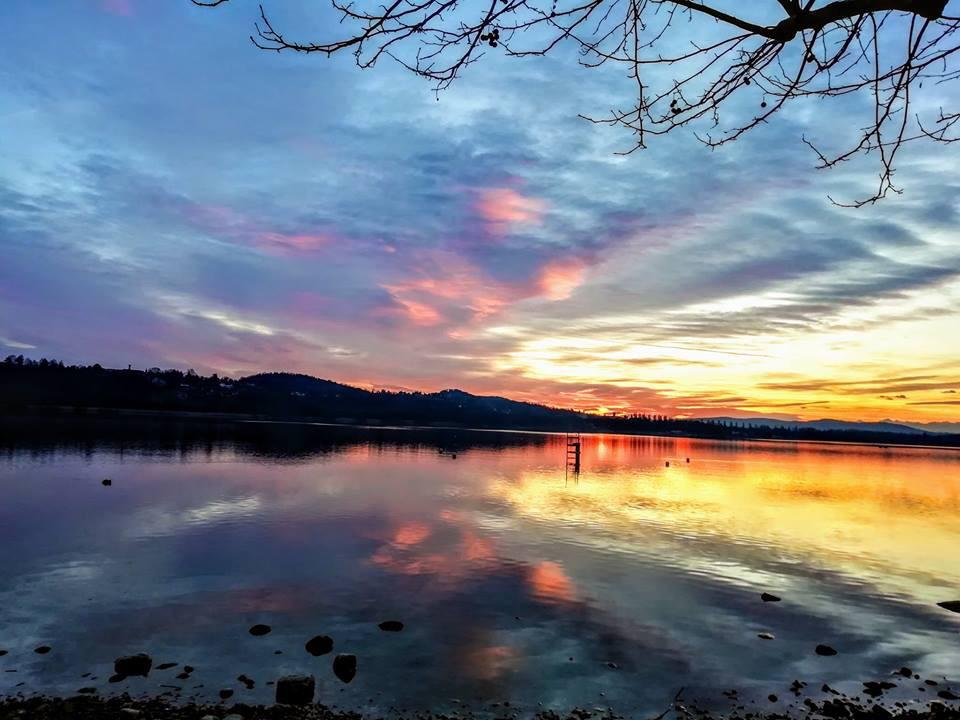
Sunset over Lago di Ghirla

The Ghirla Lake is a small lake of glacial origin and is surrounded by an environment rich in vegetation. The Ghirla Lake is located at 442 meters above sea level, is up to 14 meters deep and has as its only affluent the Margorabbia river. The Lake was the location of the first ice skating contest of Italy in 1914 and the winner was Giuseppe Peck. The area has been affected by climate change, and despite the nickname of “Siberia del Varesotto”, the temperatures do not drop as low as they used to in the past. This decrease in winter temperatures has made the lake far more dangerous for ice skaters, and in winter 2017 the mayor of Valganna recommended citizens not to skate or walk on the Lake. The Ghirla Lake has a small beach, covered in green grass, and since the water is very clean, it is a popular summer swimming location. It is also popular for camping and horse riding.

In the Ghirla Lake area are situated the Valganna Caves, of karst origin, and the Birra Poretti factory.

=== Ganna Lake ===
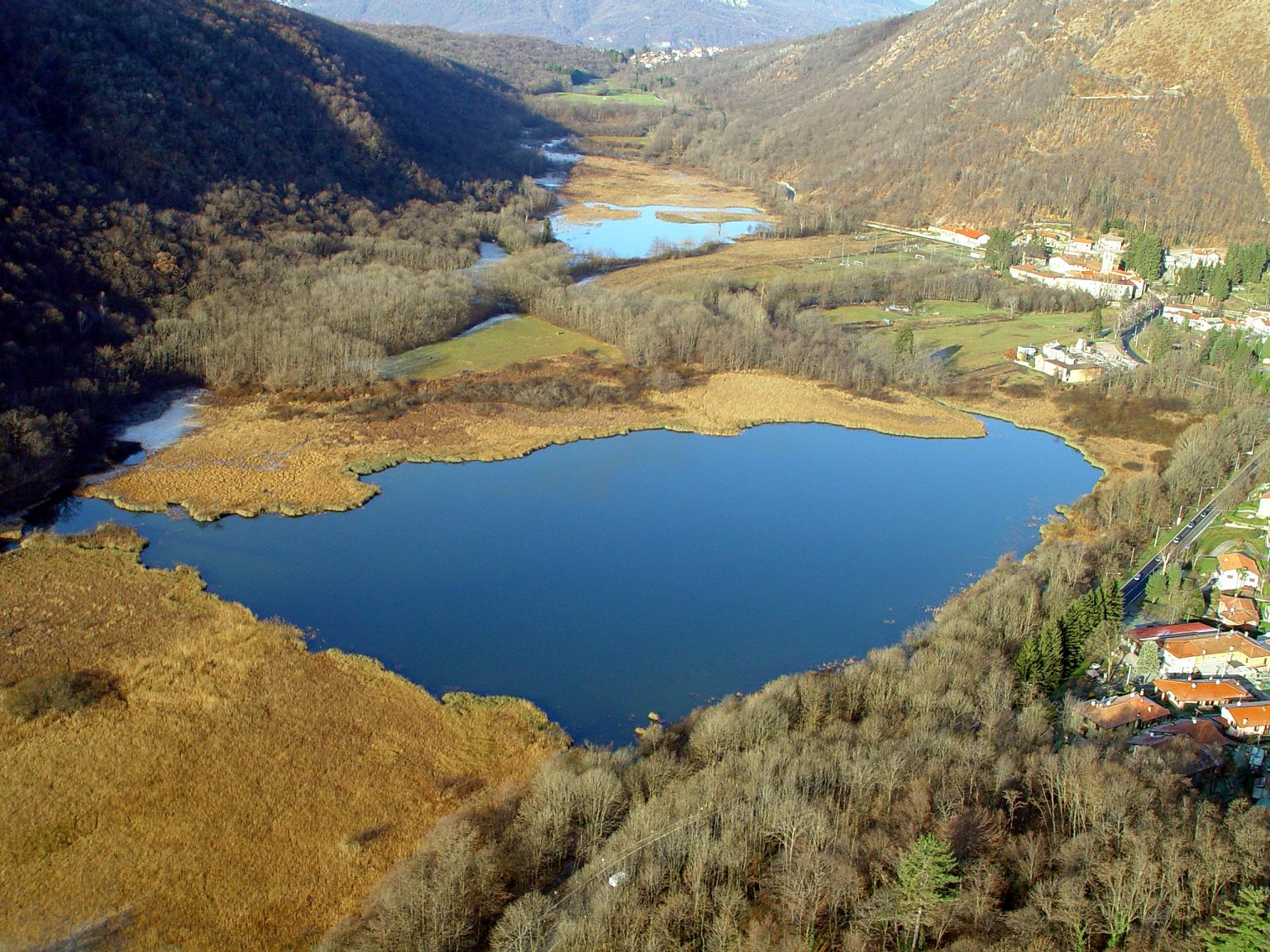
Ganna lake seen from above

Lake Ganna takes the name from the valley it sits in, Valganna, and is situated 452 meters above sea level in a wooded area. It has environmental significance due to the presence of small animals and plants that originally colonized the area during the last ice age and now constitute rare species, preserved due to the particular environmental conditions of the valley. The Ganna Lake has a surface area of 6 hectares, an average depth of 2 meters (reaching a maximum depth of 4 meters), and a perimeter of 1 kilometer. The lake is particularly clean due to the frequent change of the water (more than once a month), and the absence of factories and other polluting factors. Ganna Lake's principal affluent is the Margorabbia river. The temperatures near the river stay relatively low all year round and this affects the flora and fauna.

=== Laghetto di Cavagnano ===
The Laghetto di Cavagnano, also called Torbiera di Cavagnano, is a small lake situated near the hamlet of Cavagnano (Cuasso al Monte). It is fueled by springs situated under the lake. It has only one effluent, which after a few hundred meters becomes a tributary of the Cavallizza.

== Flora and fauna ==
=== Flora ===
The vegetation found in the Cinque Vette Park area is typical of the Northern Prealps. The most common plant is the Chestnut wood, dominant in the altimetric range between 450 and 700 meters. Mountain Maple, Field Maple, Ash, and occasionally Oak and White Hornbeam have also been observed in the area. The herbaceous flora of the chestnut undergrowth includes the anemone, the crocus, the primrose, the periwinkle, the liverwort and the lungwort. More rarely, cyclamen and narcissus have been identifies, especially on calcareous soils. In cooler and more humid areas, generally above 900 meters, a majority of beech forest grows; its undergrowth includes Prenanthes purpurea, Sorrel, Asperula Odorata, Lilium Martagon, Cyclamen, Solomon's Seal, and Firefly Grass among the shrubs and herbaceous plants. The anthropogenic reforestation of conifers (Spruce, Scots pine, and Strobe Pine) are marginal: easier to find are the anthropogenic reforestations of Locust trees, which can be found especially along the banks of rivers and Lake Lugano. On the sides of Mount Piambello heather grows densely, as do berry bushes on the road that links Ghirla to Badero Valcuvia and Mondonico.

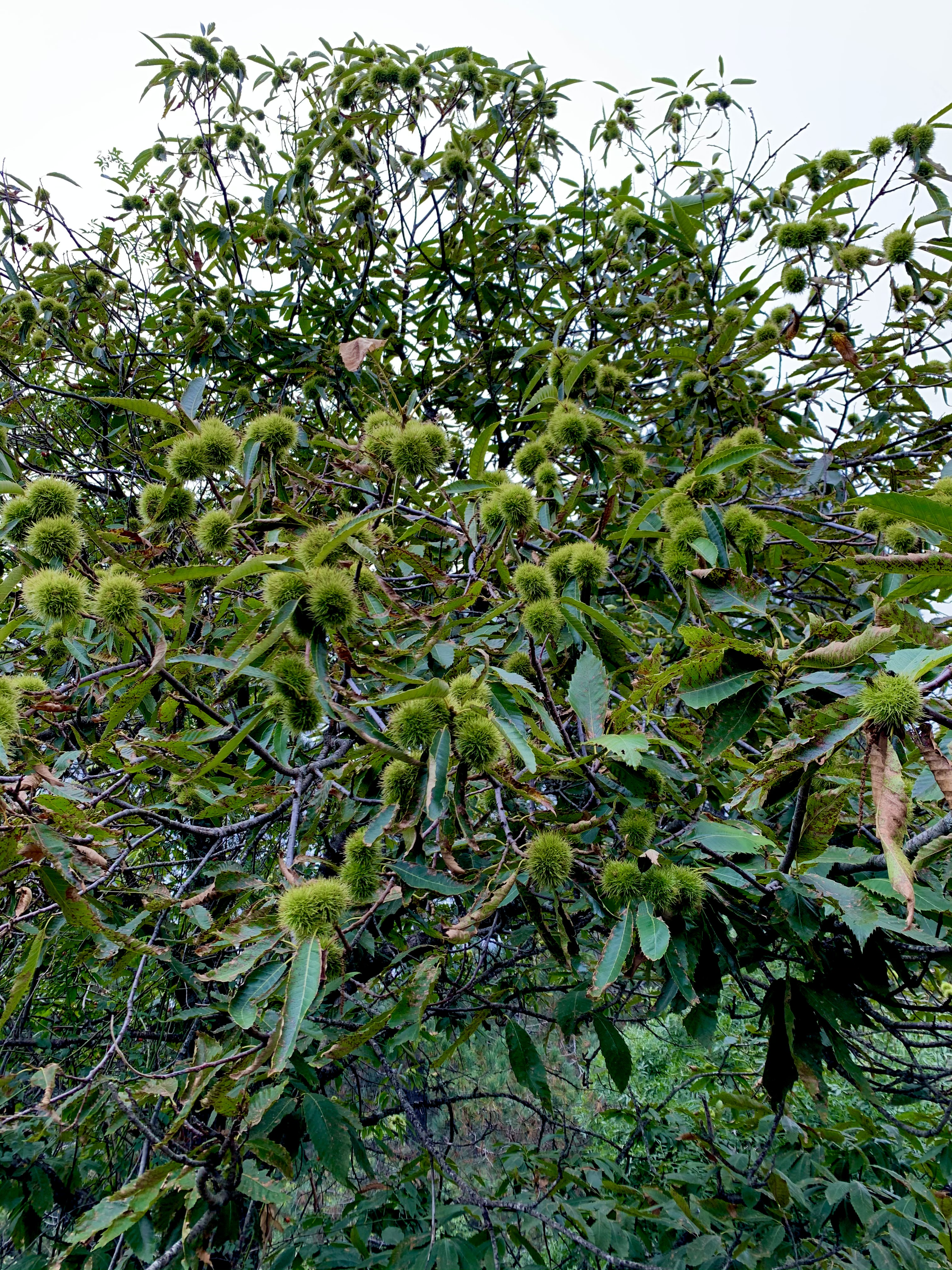
Chestnut tree

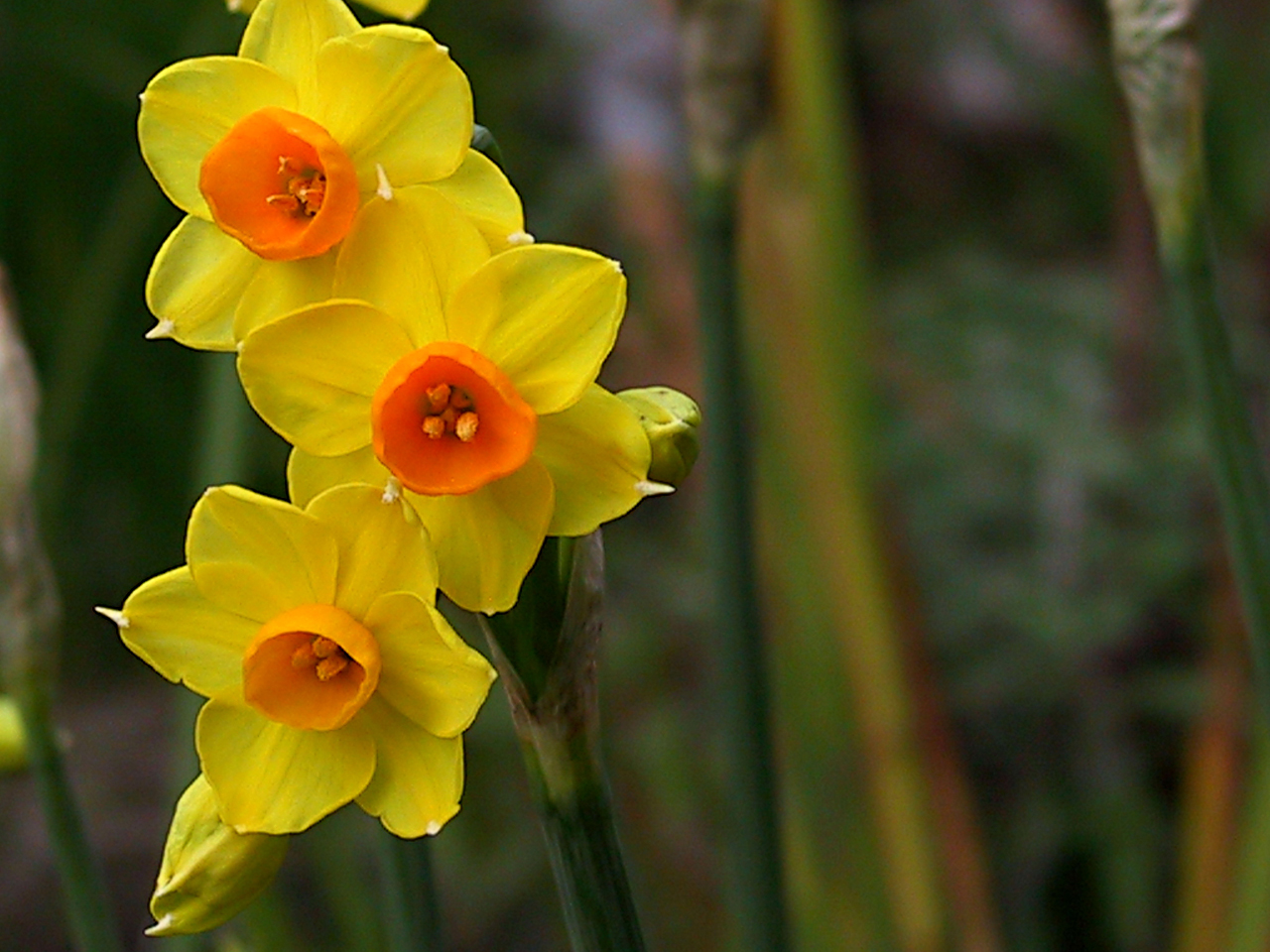
Narcissus

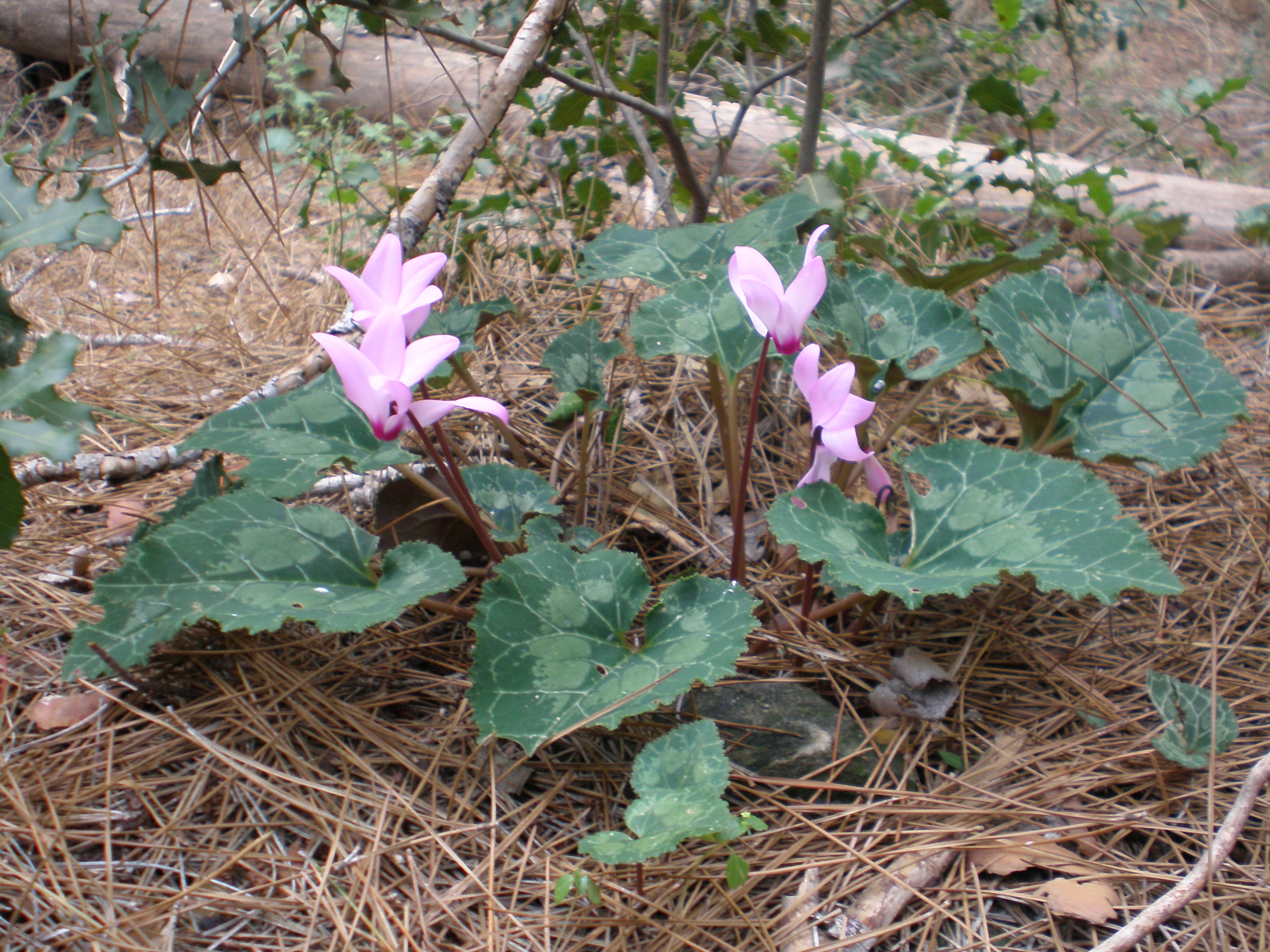
Cyclamen

=== Fauna ===
Some of the mammals that commonly populate the Piambello territory are foxes, moles, squirrels, badgers, wild boars, hedgehogs. In 2012 the Province of Varese also confirmed the presence of a few isolated specimens of deer and a young chamois has been spotted in the area between Ghirla and Cunardo in 2005. Nests of the mute swan were found on the Lake Lugano and the Tresa shores. The mallard, moorhen and the sedentary and migrant coots, inhabitants of swamps and small lakes rich in vegetation like the Ganna Lake, the Ghirla Lake and the Laghetto Cicogna (Arcisate), are the most common volatiles in the province. There are rarer occurrences of the diurnal rapacious Biancone, whose nests are usually found in the area between Campo dei Fiori and the Ganna Valley. Autoctone fauna is preserved in a small lake in the fraction of Cavagnano, Cuasso al Monte (Laghetto di Cavagnano). The frosone, a finch that nests at a height of 200–600 meters, nests in the Lavena Ponte Tresa and Valganna area, like the Black Kite, whose nests are placed in isolated places. Groups of bats have been found in the Valganna caves, in the Orrido di Cunardo and on the Mount Pravello. Some of the amphibians common toad, common frog, latest frog, green frog, dalmatian frog and fire salamander Italian tree frog and the dotted newt have been found in the area. Lake Ganna is home to roach, rudd, perch, tench and catfish. Pike inhabits both the pond and the waterways connected to it. The native crayfish is a rare crustacean that stands out for its high naturalistic value and location. Lake Ghirla hosts rudd, tench, carp, perch, and pike.

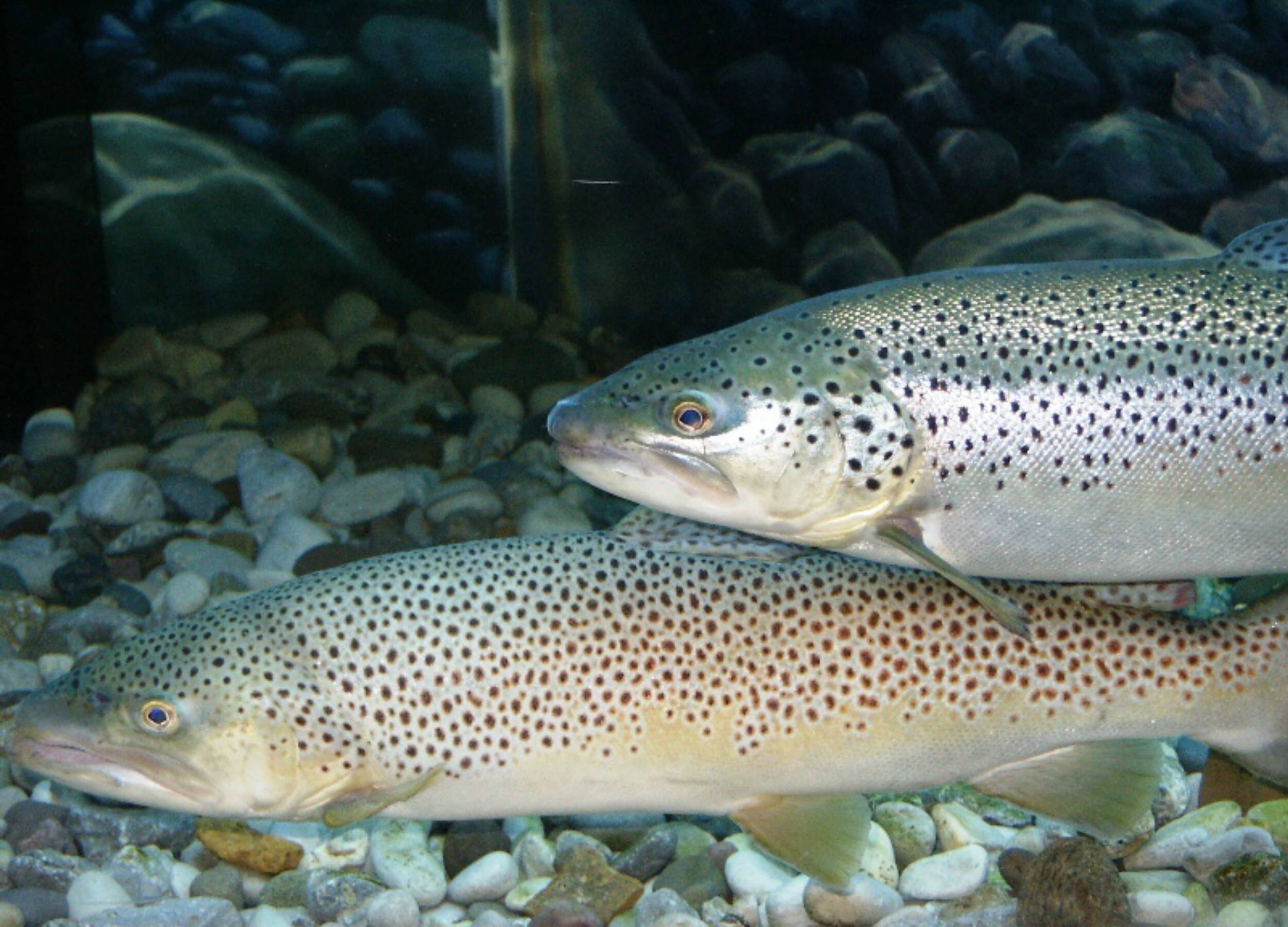
Brown trouts

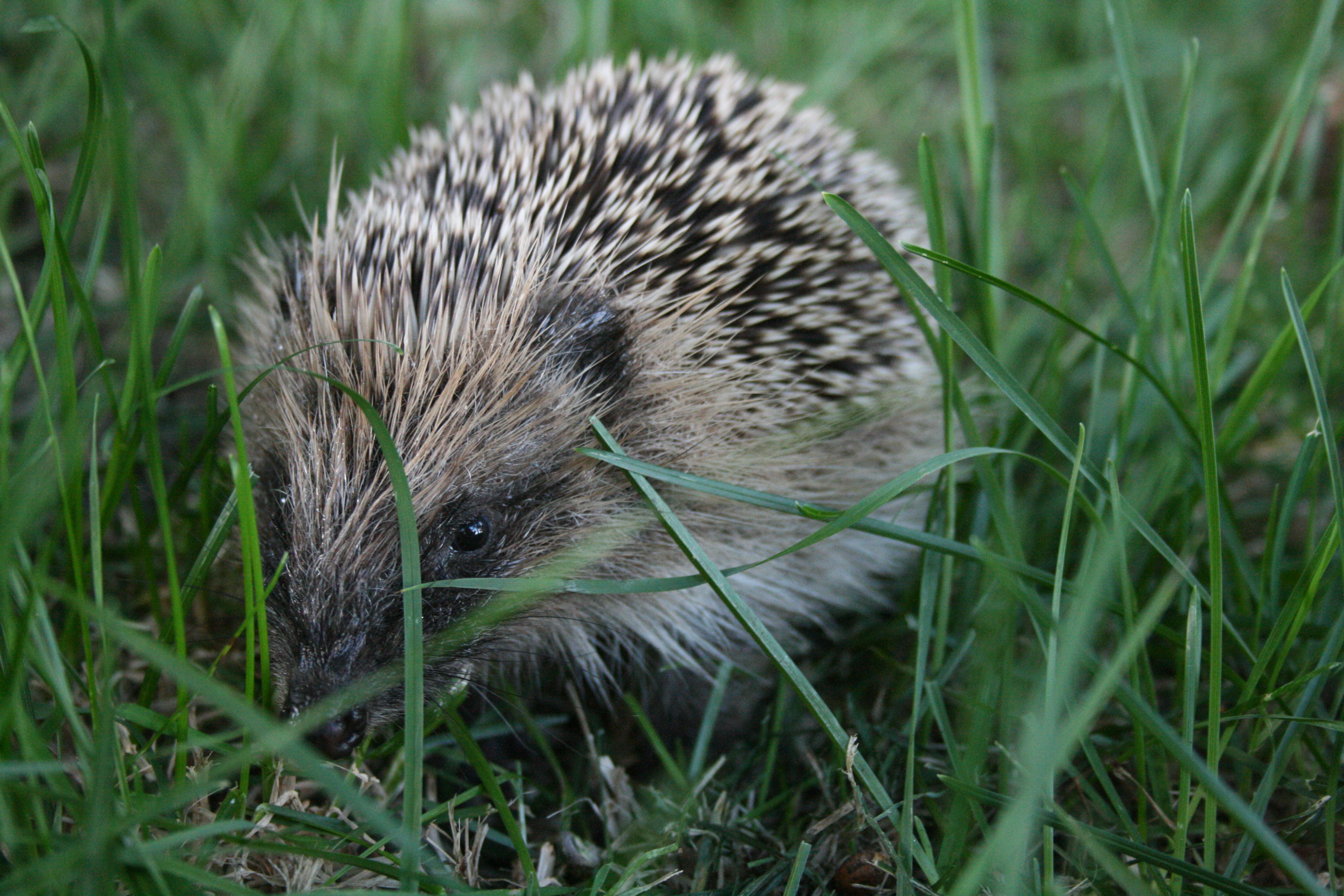
Hedgehog

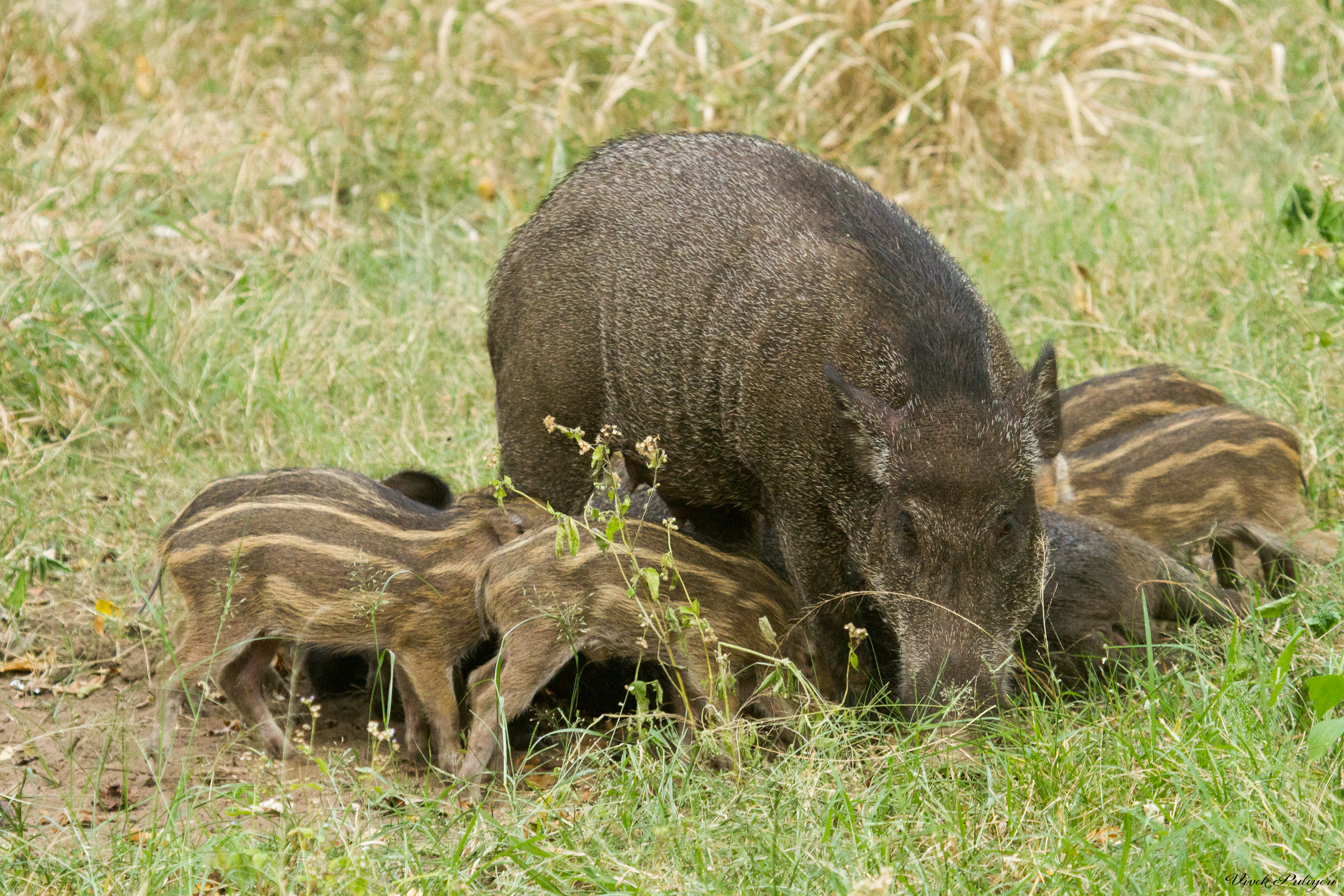
Wild Boars

== Activities ==
=== Trails ===
The following hiking trails are available in the park:

	Punta Paradiso - Alpe Croce	Cavagnano Poncione	Cammino dei frontalieri	Bocchetta Sasso Bolle	Bocchetta Marzio Stivoni
From	Cuasso al Monte	Laghetto di Cavagnano	Laghetto di Cavagnano	Hospital of Cuasso al Monte	Hospital of Cuasso al Monte
To	Cuasso al Monte	Summit of Mount Poncione	Porto Ceresio	Summit of Mount Piambello	Bocchetta degli Stivioni
Estimated Travel Time	4 h	4 h	3:30 h	4:30 h	2:00 h
Length	11 km	11 km	10 km	12 km	8 km
Elevation gain	400 m	450 m	350 m	500 m	250 m

==== Punta Paradiso - Alpe Croce ====
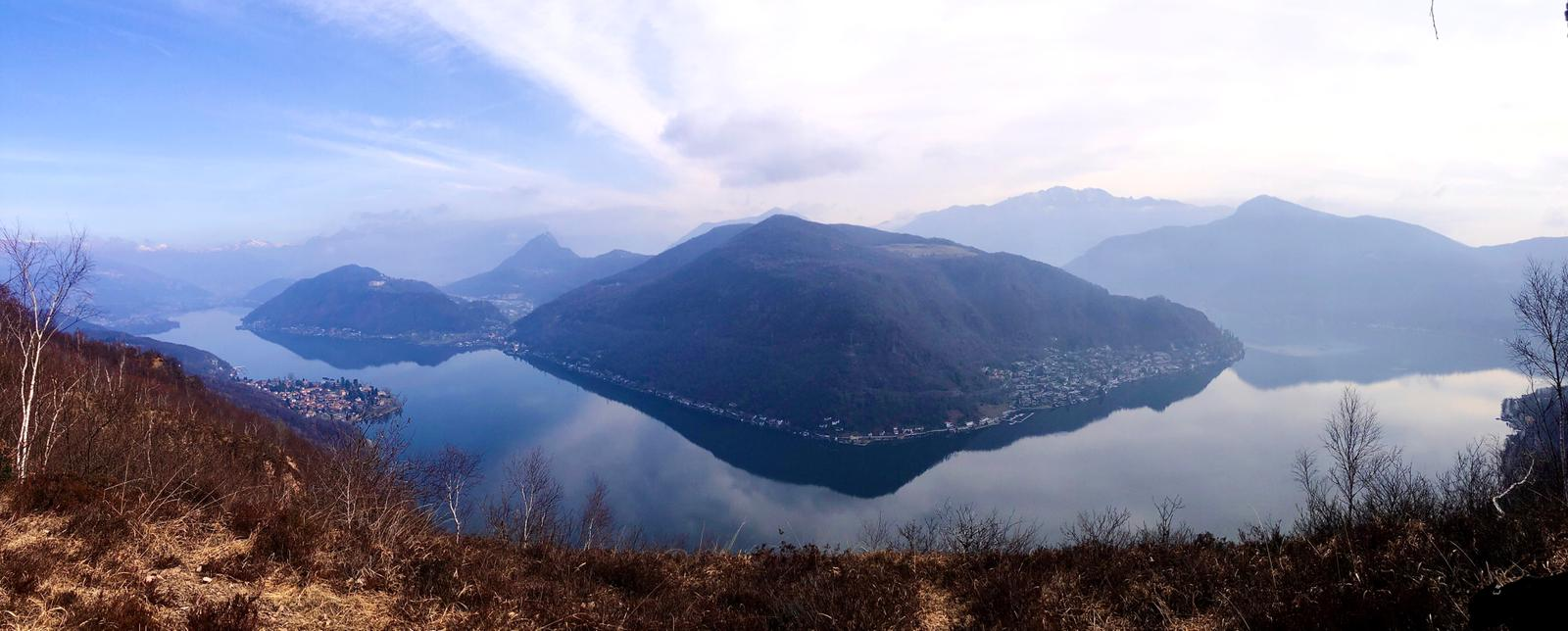
View of the lake lugano from punta paradiso

This trek is a circular route accessible from Cuasso al Monte, Marzio and Valganna. The closest access is from Marzio, from which it takes about four hours to walk its 4.3 kilometers of length. The path intersects a number of valleys, woods and streams. An alternative trek starts from Cavagnano (council of Cuasso al Monte) and takes approximately four hours, with an ascent of about 400 meters and 11 kilometers of walking. From Punta Paradiso there is a view from above of Lake Lugano. After leaving Punta Paradiso, the trek goes through the First World War trenches of the Cadorna Line, until reaching the Sasso Paradiso. Then, climbing up to the Alpe Croce and to Bocchetta Stivioni, the highest point of this trek is reached. The way back to Cavagnano goes through the village of Imborgnana (Cuasso al Monte) from where an old and narrow road leads to Cavagnano. On this trail a particular panoramic spot, Sasso Paradiso, offers a view on the Lugano Lake, Ticinesi and Comasche Prealps.

==== Cavagnano Poncione ====
This 14 kilometers long trail starts from the Laghetto di Cavagnano and takes about four hours to be completed, with approximately 450 meters of ascent. The trek passes through boulders and cliffs of red porphyry and has unpaved roads. After having walked this path, the Torrente Cavallizza is reached. The trek continues among chestnuts and beech woods until reaching the road, which links Bisuschio to Alpe Tedesco; from this point starts the way up to Mount Poncione. The summit gives a view of the Valceresio and the Valganna.

==== Cammino dei Frontalieri ====
This Trek takes about 3 hours and a half to be completed, it is a round tour with 350 meters ascent. The route starts from the Laghetto di Cavagnano (Cuasso al Monte). This trek does not lead to the mountain summit. It leads to Porto Ceresio, from which a woodland path returns to the start at Cavagnano.

==== Bocchetta Sasso Bolle ====
This trek starts from the Cuasso al Monte Hospital. It is 12 kilometers long, with 500 meters ascent. It is a circular tour and takes about four hours and a half to be completed. After leaving the Hospital the Bocchetta dei Frati is reached via a woodland path, from which a path leads to the attraction of this trek, the Sass Boll observatory, in proximity of the summit of Mount Piambello. From the summit, a walking path returns to the starting point.

==== Bocchetta Marzio Stivioni ====
The route starts from the Hospital of Cuasso al Monte and takes about two hours to be completed. It is 8 kilometers long and 250 meters ascent. The first path leads to Bocchetta dei Frati, then descends to the village of Marzio. From here, the path climbs to reach the Bocchetta degli Stivioni.

=== Mountain biking ===
There are five main mountain biking trails, most of them require skills and cautious behavior while others, less difficult, are featured for beginners in order to improve their skills.

Marathon Trail

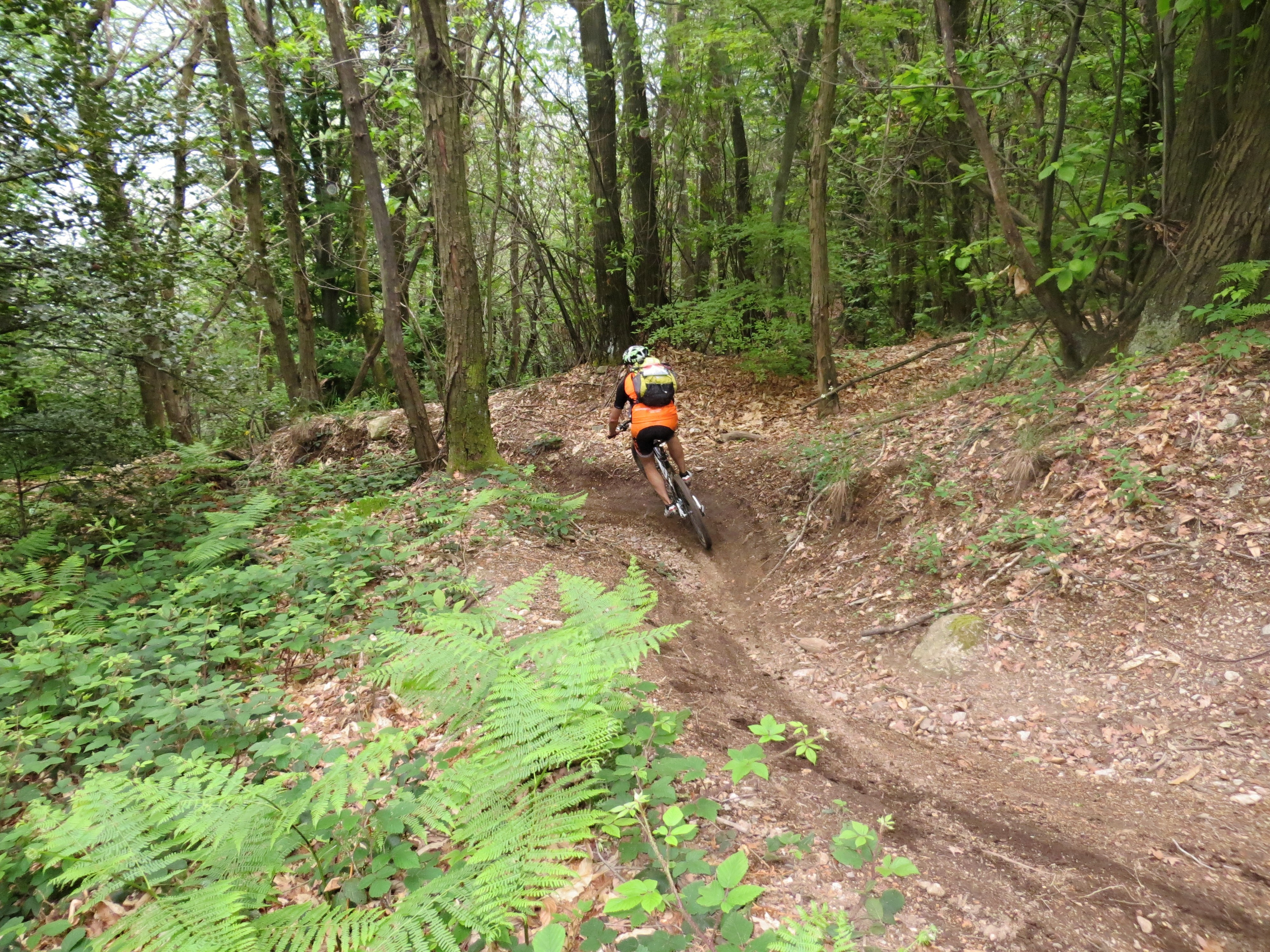
Picture of a Biker taken in one of the trail's park

The Marathon Trail is the main mountain biking trail within the park. It retraces for a big portion part of the tracks, on which it takes place the Granfondo "Tre Valli Varesine Off-Road" event. It has an estimated travel time of about 3 hours to cover its 29,2 km of length. The itinerary starts from the parking in front of the lake in Porto Ceresio, heading hinterland towards Cuasso al Piano, then it continues on to the hamlet of Roncaccio until it reaches a steep ascent towards the village of Pogliana. The route then continues in the direction of Alpe Tedesco along a forest road which is characterized by patchy downhills. The track then goes towards the Alpe Tedesco, skimming the slopes of the Poncione di Ganna, and descends in the direction of the Cuasso al Monte hospital, where there are some short ups and downs during the loss of altitude. Once reached the crossroads of the hospital, the track keeps on to the area of Imborgnana until it reaches the highest point of the path at the Bocchetta dei Frati. The path continues downhill to the small town of Marzio towards Mount Derta and avoiding the deviation that goes up to the right for the Bocchetta Stivione, it continues straight on reaching Alpe Croce, then by taking a short variant it is possible to reach the panoramic viewpoint of Sasso Paradiso. Then the trail goes back to the main track where it starts the descent to Porto Ceresio on a good sliding path which leads to find again the asphalt before reaching the hamlet of Borgnana, underneath the city of Cuasso Al Monte. Finally, for the return to Porto Ceresio, there are several options: one goes up towards Borgnana, heading to the provincial road of Porto Ceresio, a few hundred meters from the starting point; alternatively, once finished the path previously described, it is possible to go down directly before Porto Ceresio and take the provincial road that runs along the lake, or another variant could be going up to Borgnana and end the biking tour in Cuasso al Piano where there are road variants to quickly return to Porto Ceresio.

==== Patanegra ====
This trail takes its name from the Spanish delicacy, and it was added in 2018 for the first Enduro Cup Lombardy. The track starts at the height of Alpe del Tedesco and descends to Cuasso al Piano, with a length of almost 6 kilometers and a descent of 700 meters.

The black diamond single track trail of Patanegra can only be biked downhill, and it takes on average 12 minutes to be completed.

==== Cross Country ====
This track is 2 kilometers long and climbs about 400 meters. It passes Lake Lugano and offers views of the First World War trenches. This mountain biking trail is a circular route combining history, nature and sport.

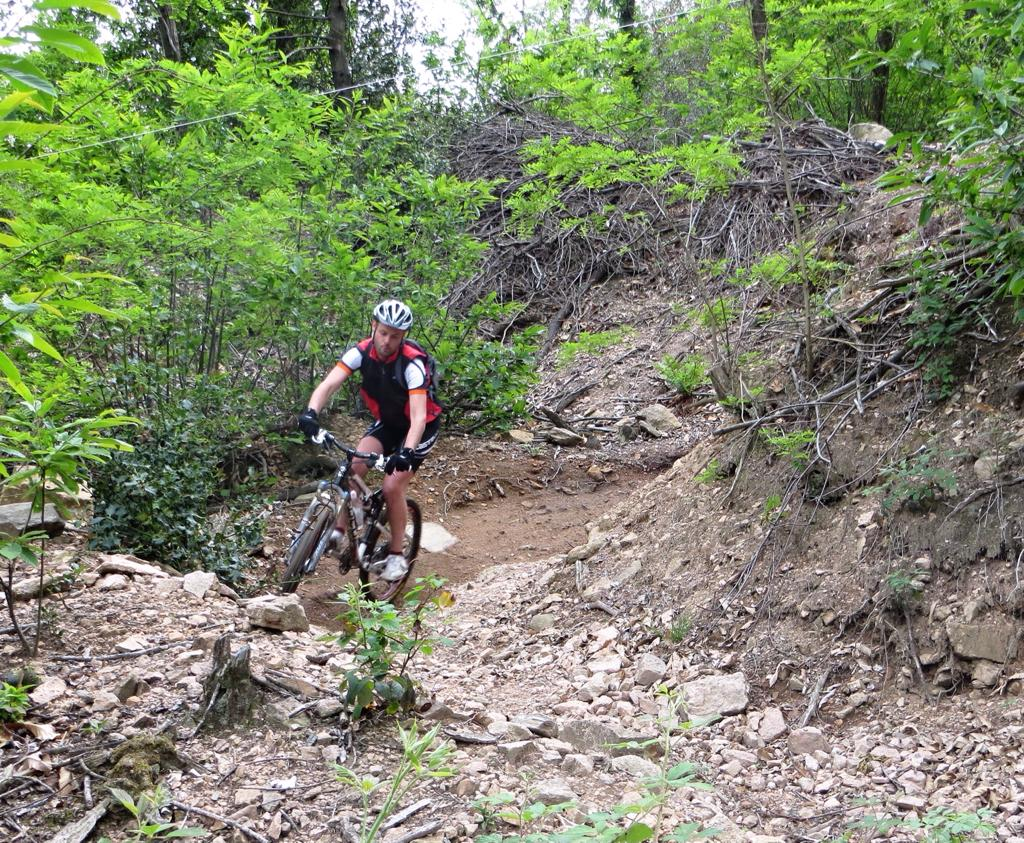
Picture of a biker in Happy High track

==== Happy Mountain ====
The almost 5 kilometers track is divided into 2 different routes, Happy High and Happy Low. Happy High starts from the highest point of the mountain, above the Cavagnano pond. It is the most difficult track of the two, with various technical points and jumps. This track is recommended for beginner riders to help them gain more confidence and speed while still enjoying the panoramic views that it has to offer. While this set of trails offers inexperienced bikers an opportunity to better their skills, it also suits expert bikers. The trail is featured with double jumps, drops, a rock garden, and many turns, all linked by curves and parabolas that keep the rhythm of biking fast. It is only biked downhill and it is advised to bike them on AM, Cross Country, and Fat tires bikes. Happy low is much easier if compared to Happy High. This mountain biking trail is suitable for every biker, and it is also ideal to get familiar with the pace and the skills required for mountain biking. The entry point of this trail is situated right behind the elementary schools of Cuasso al Monte.

==== Titanium ====
This 9 kilometer-trail starts from Monte Scerè and has and is steep for 532 meters. It is one of the most technical mountain bike trails due to its many difficult and technical curves. The second part of the trail has one of the best views of the entire park. The panoramic spot, from which it is possible to see Lake Lugano, is named Punta Paradiso. It has a loop structure and it is advised to bike it on AM, Cross Country bikes, and it is a one-direction trail.

=== Running ===
==== Trail Prealpi Varesine ====
The US ACLI Cavagnano ASD organizes a cross country running contest, the Trail Prealpi Varesine, a circuit that includes a race through the Cinque Vette Park. The event is constituted of two paths, which both intersect within the park itself, making it one of the most panoramic trail in the Province of Varese. The Cuasso al Monte race is the second race of the Trail Prealpi Varesine Circuit. It is also possible to participate by walking, rather than competing as a runner. The 5 Vette trail (T5V) is 28.4 kilometers long with a 1550 D+. A shorter trail aimed at non-competitive participation also exists: it is the Mini Trail 5 Vette (mT5V), with a length of 12.5 kilometers with an 800 D+.

== Gallery ==
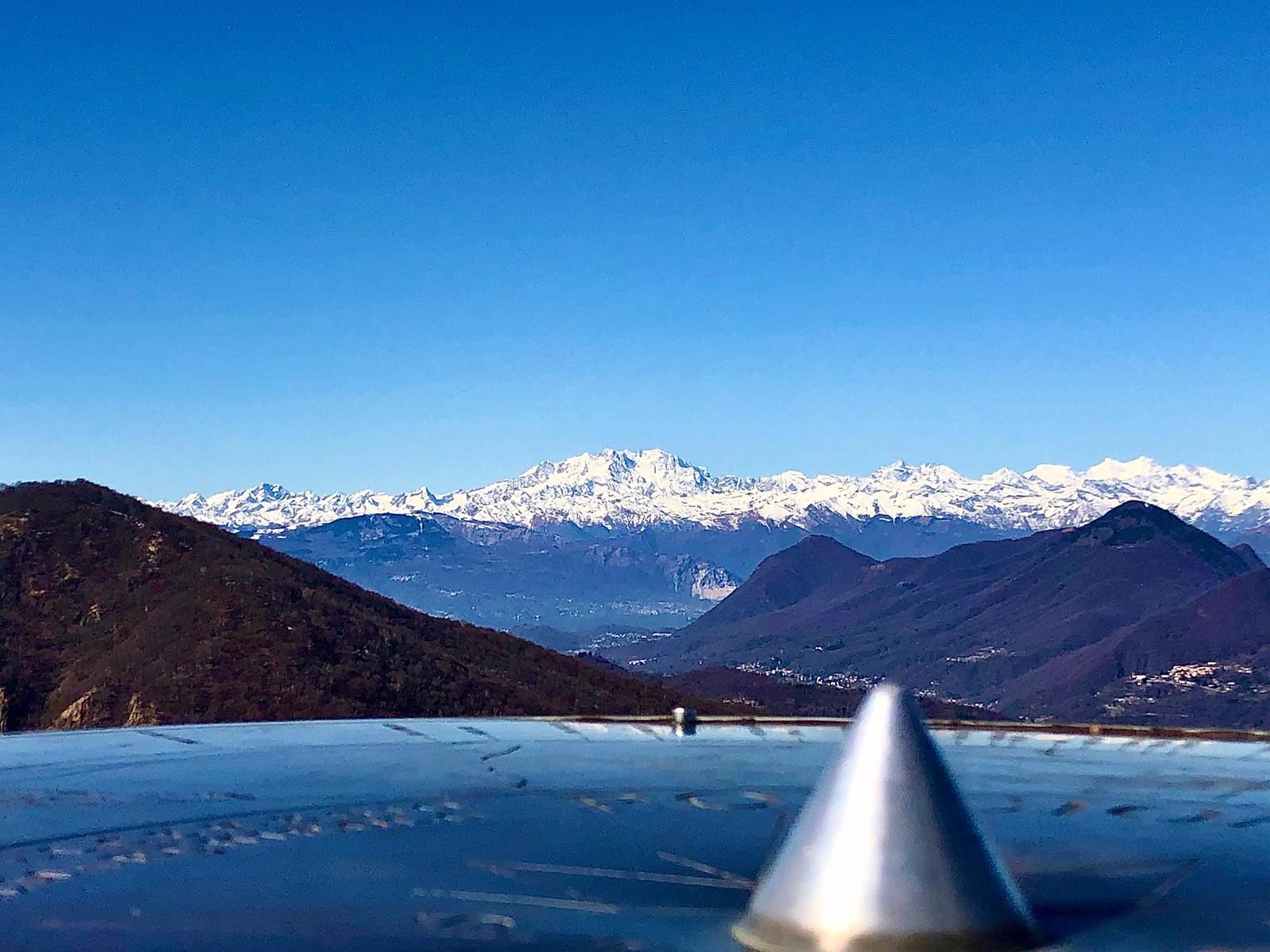
View of Monte Rosa from Mount Poncione

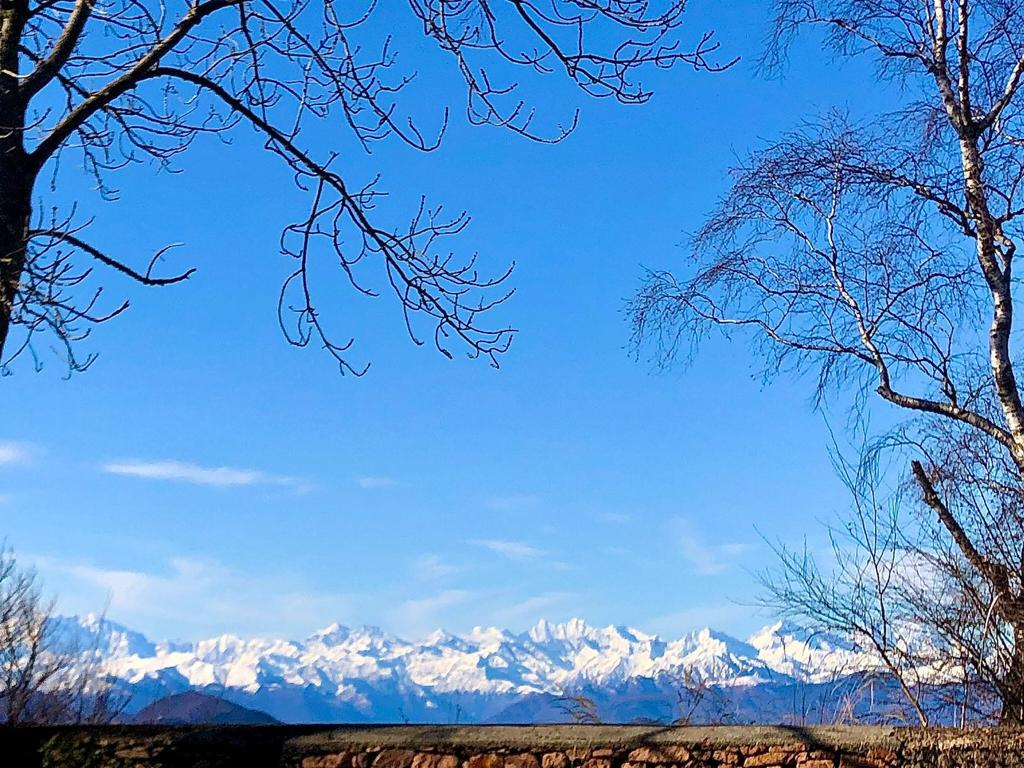
Picture of the Monte Rosa chain from Mount Marzio (Winter 2019)

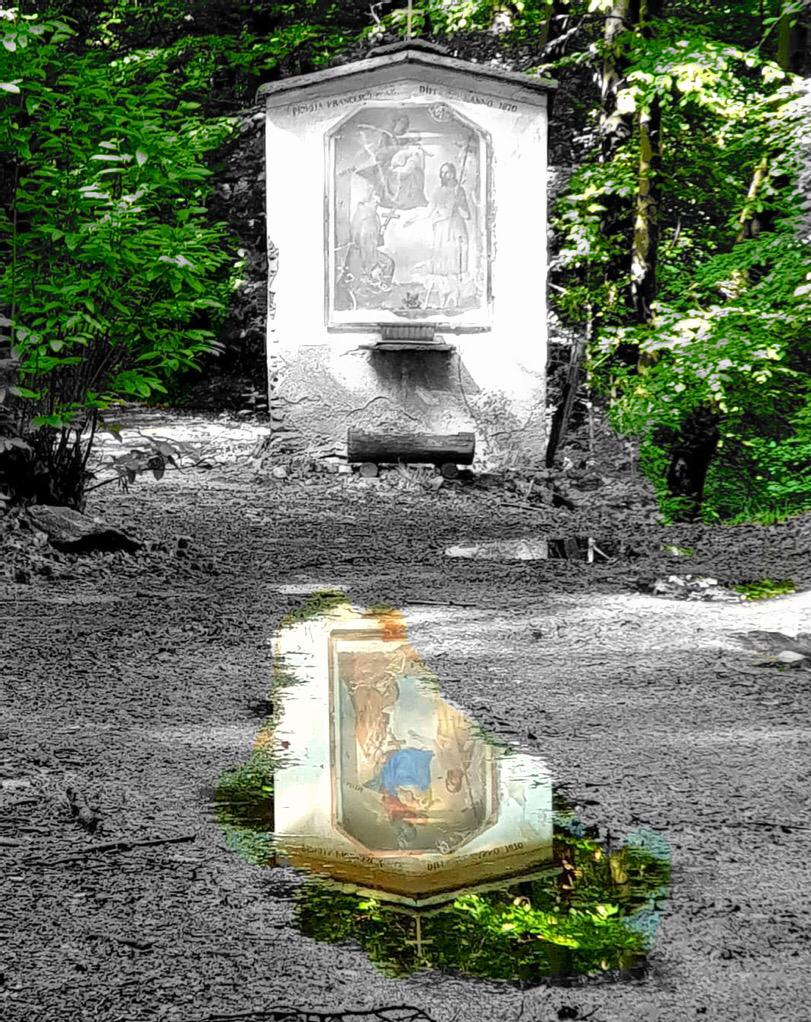
Picture of a Chapel along the path

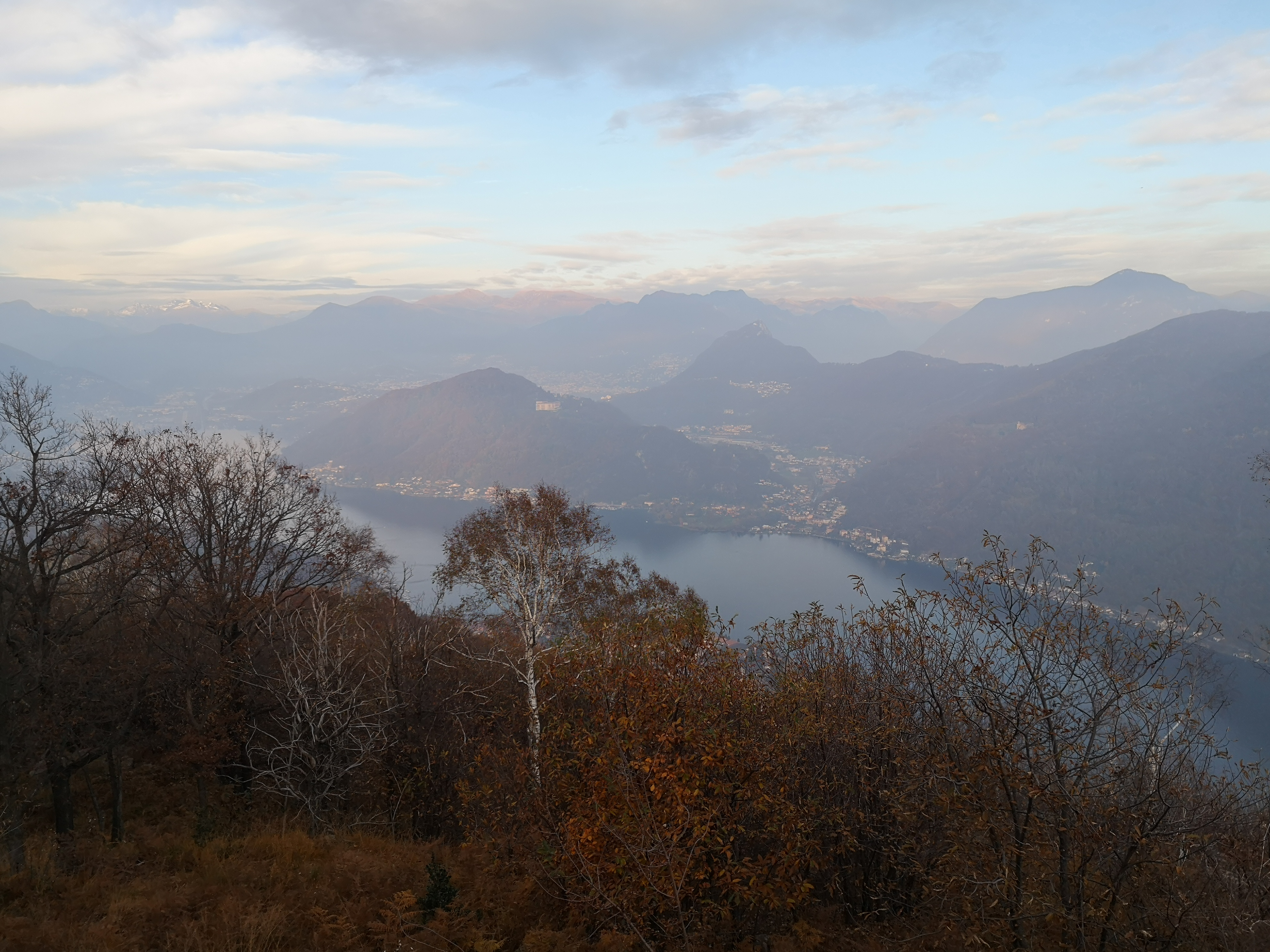
View of the Lake Lugano from Punta Paradiso

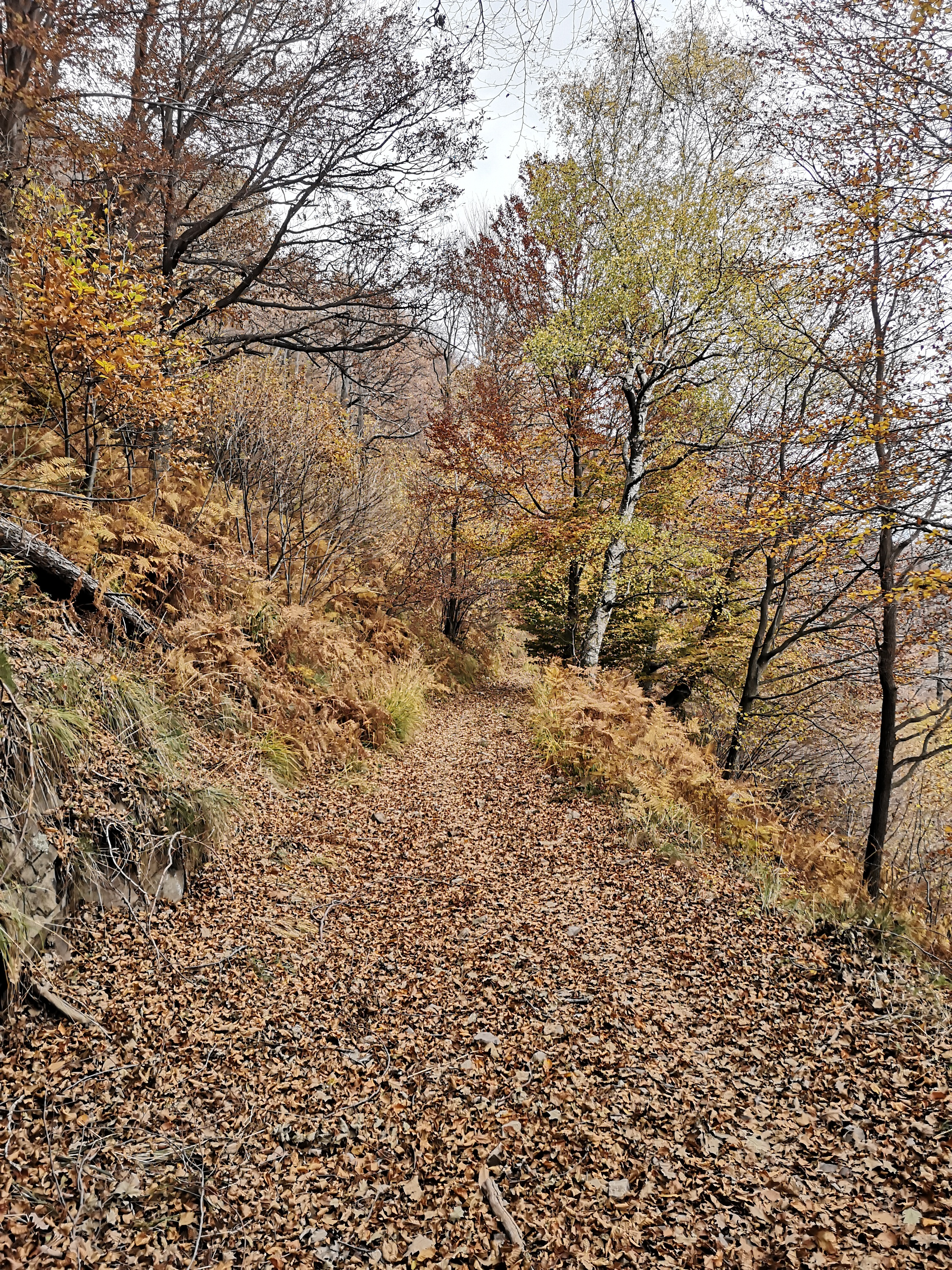
Picture representing the way up to Monte Piambello (Autumn 2020)

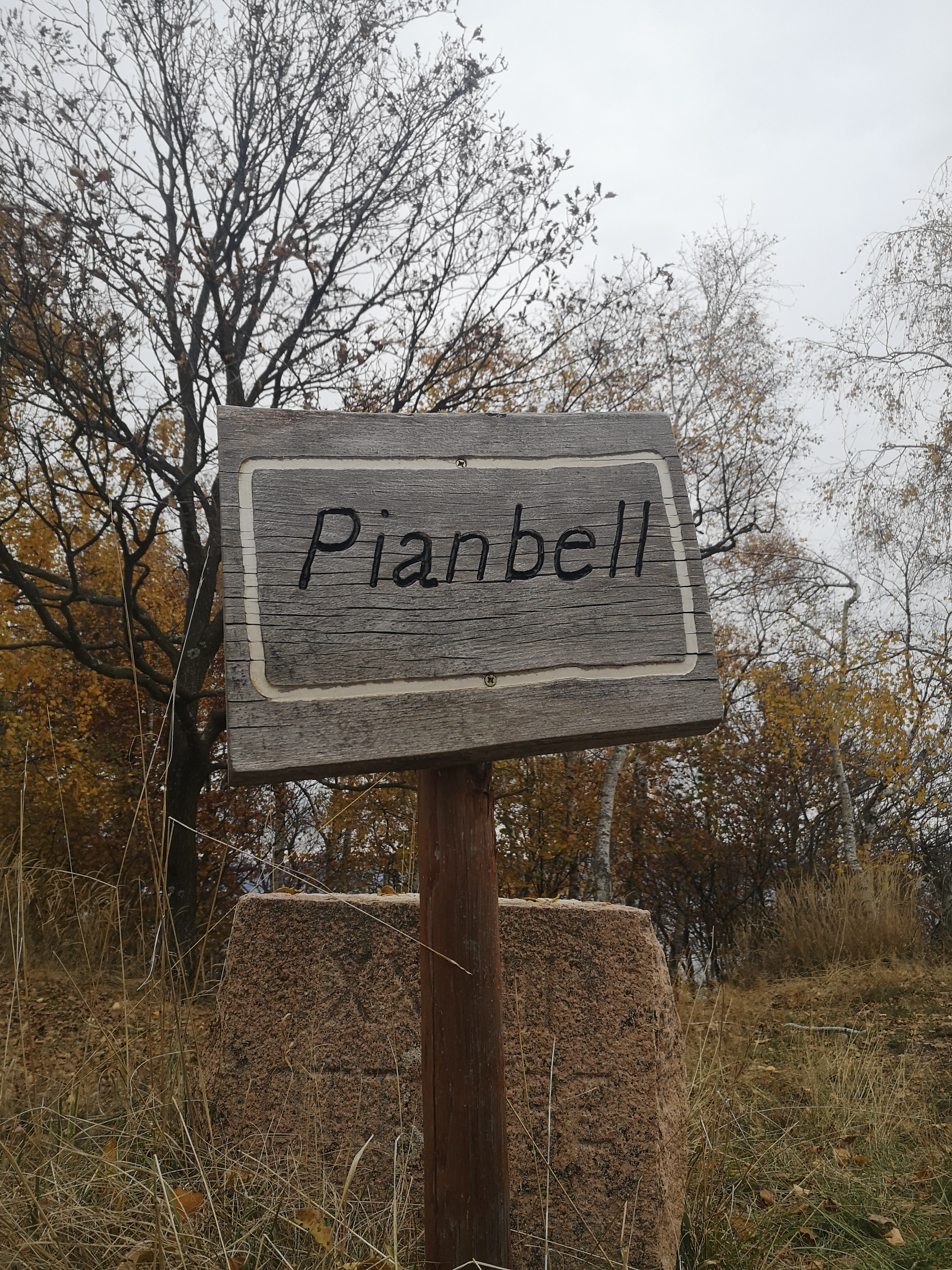
Sign representing the summit of Monte Piambello (written in Varesotto)

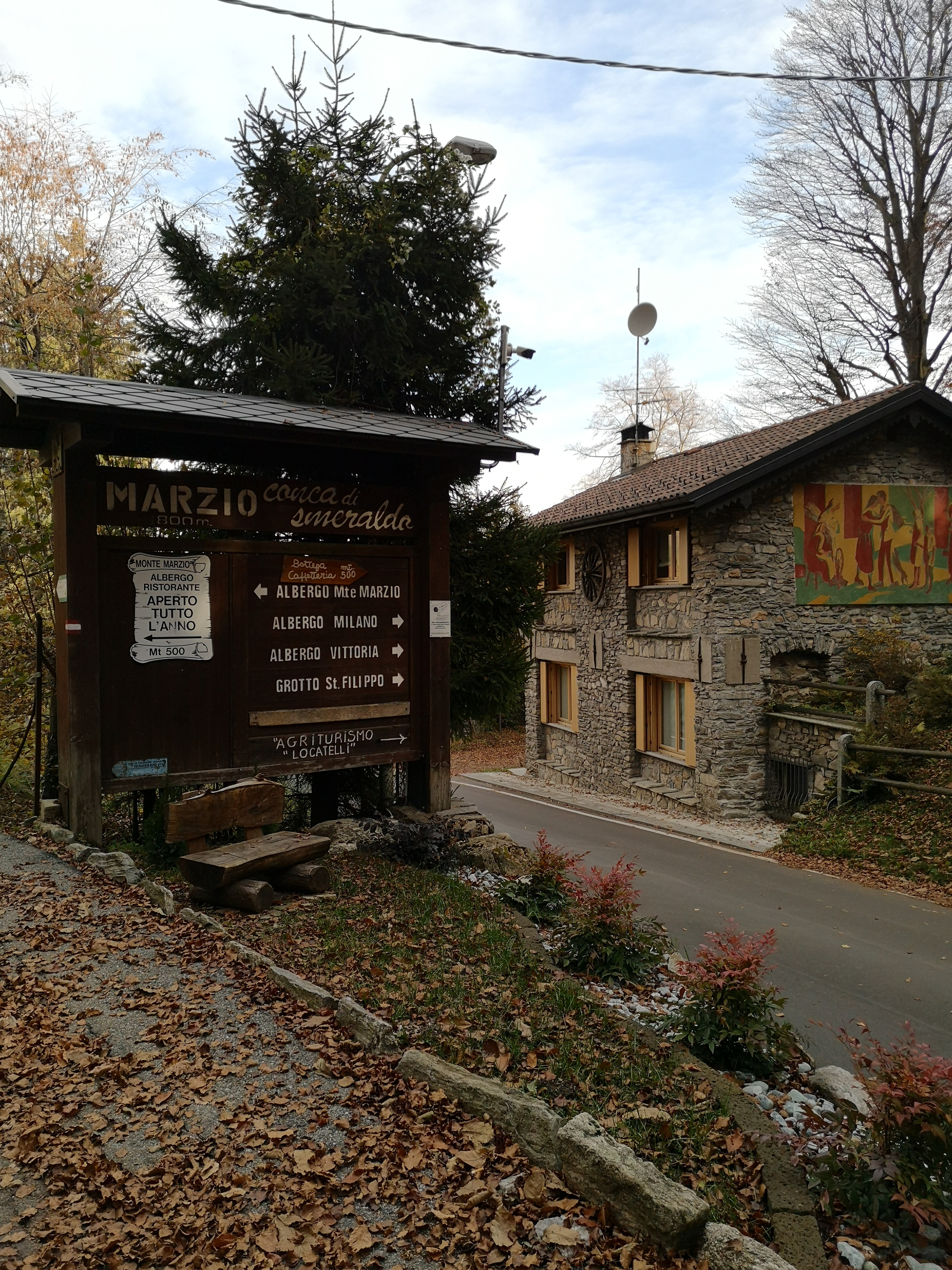
Sign at the beginning of the council of Marzio

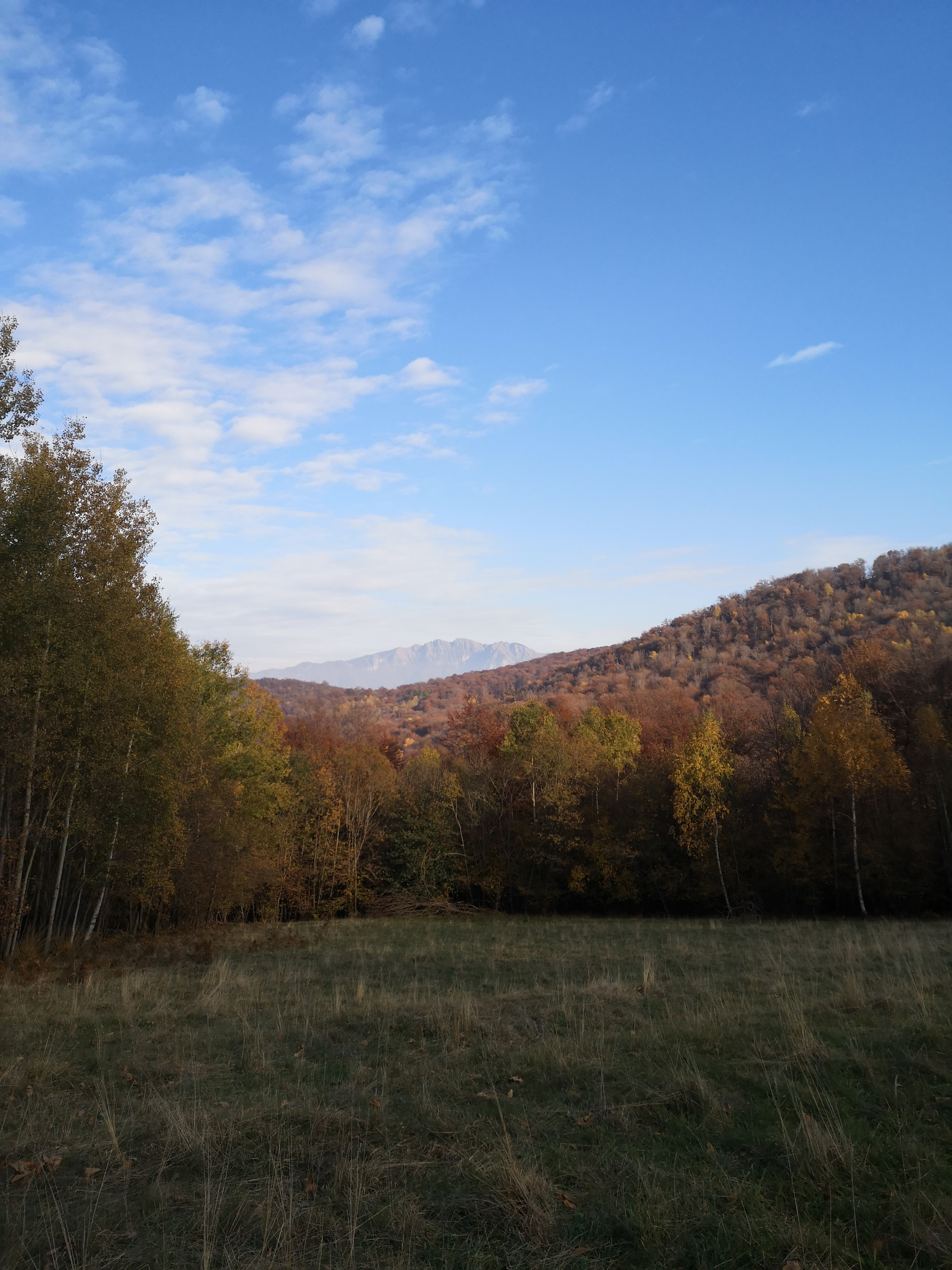
Monte Generoso view from the path to Monte Derta (Autumn 2020)

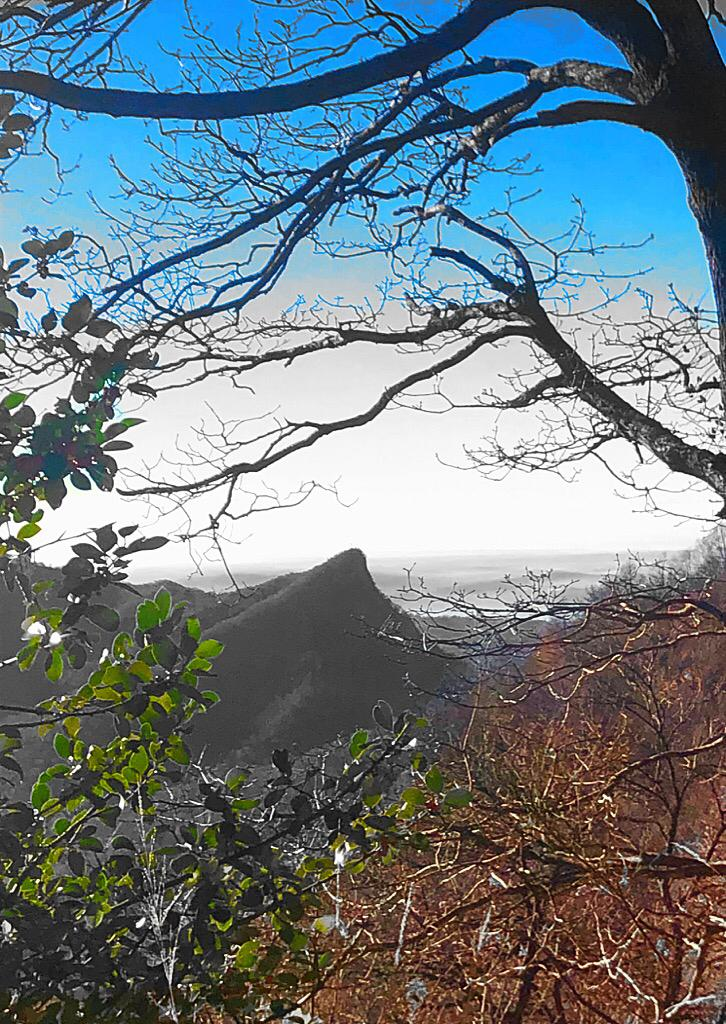
Mount Poncione seen from the path which starts from Monte Piambello and leads to the summit of the former

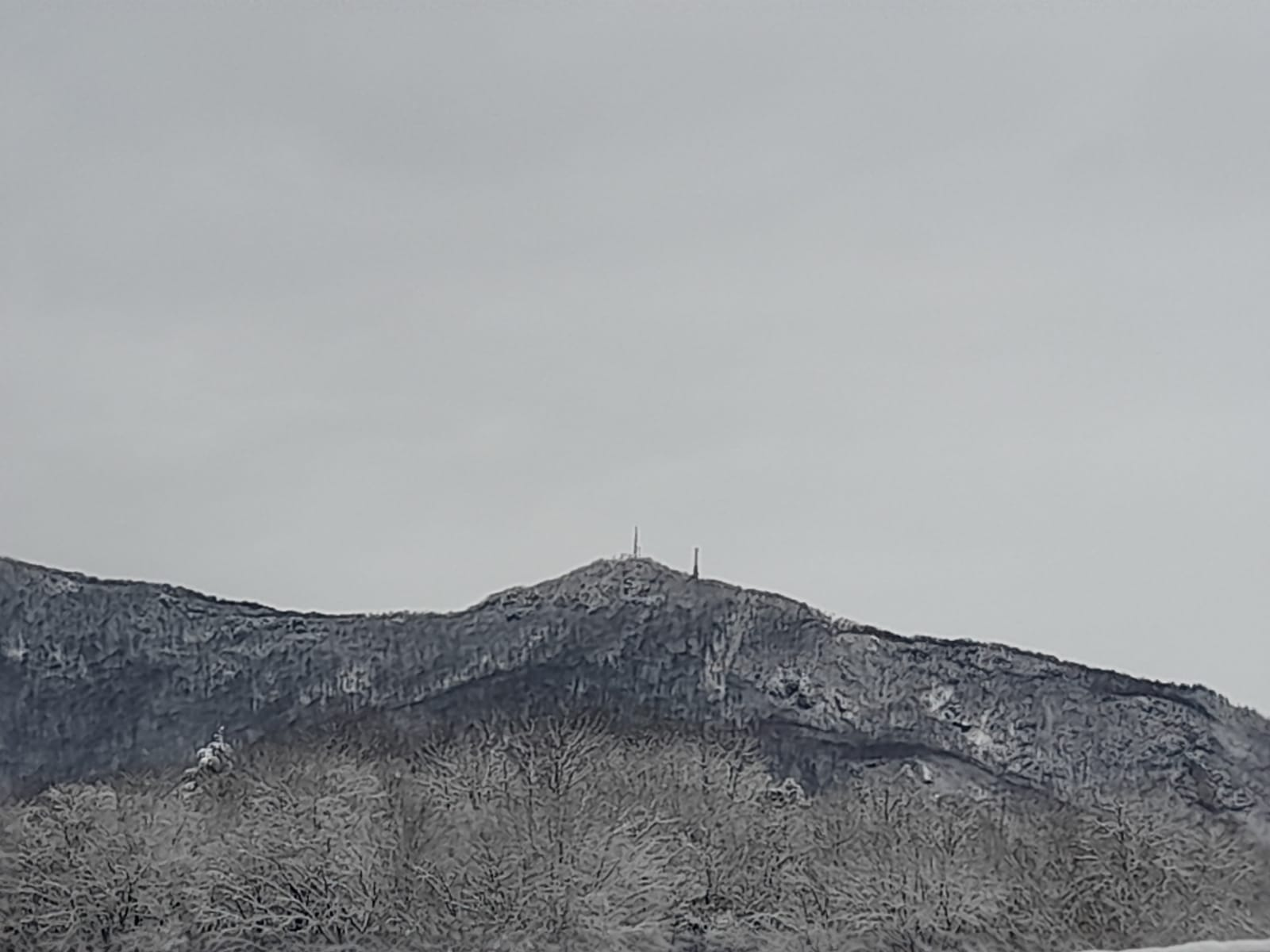
Mount Orsa and Mount Pravello during winter 2020)

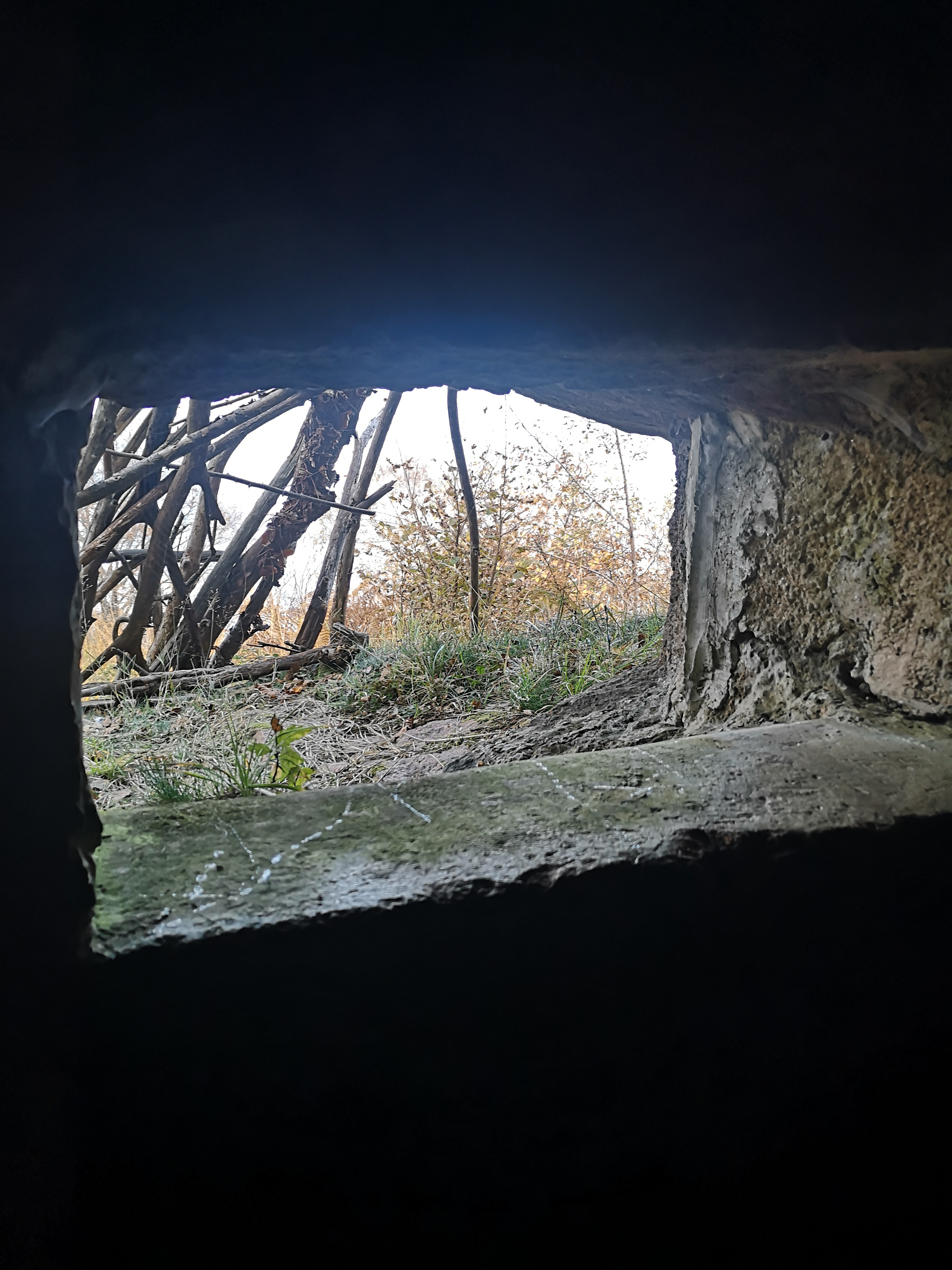
Picture of a way out of a trench located at Punta Paradiso

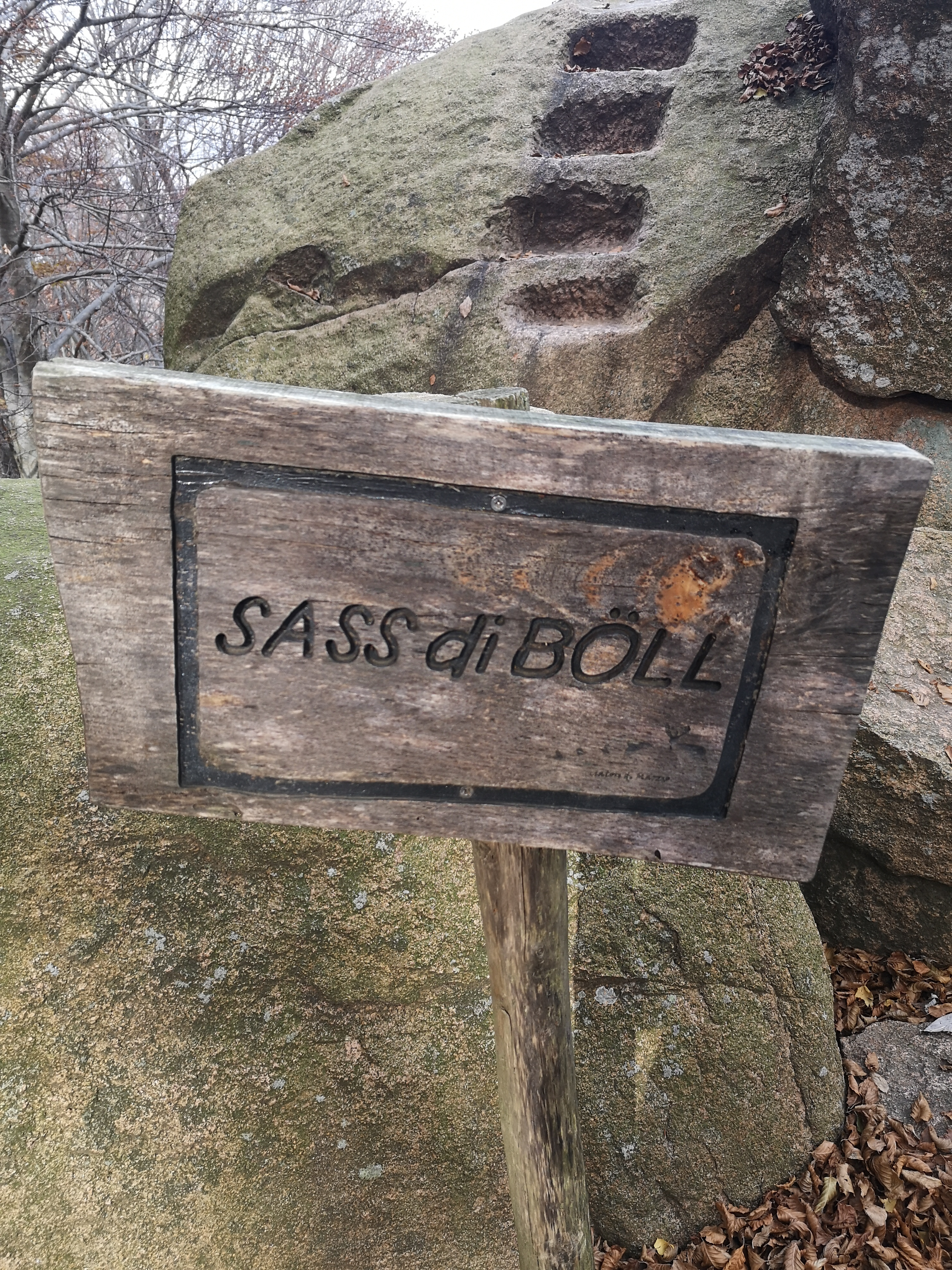
Sign of the Sass di Boll

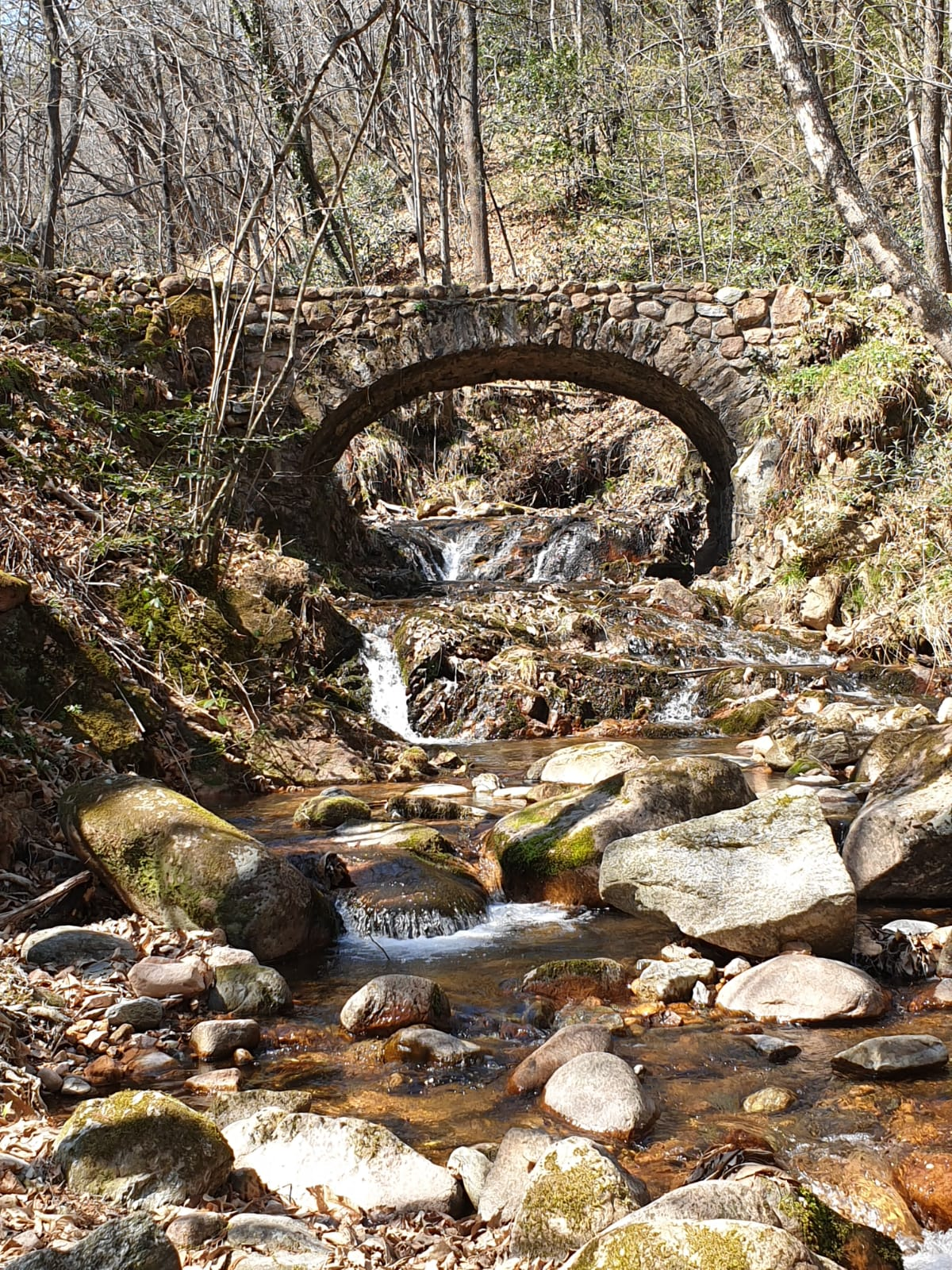
Picture of the Torrente Cavallizza, with a bridge in the background (Winter 2019)

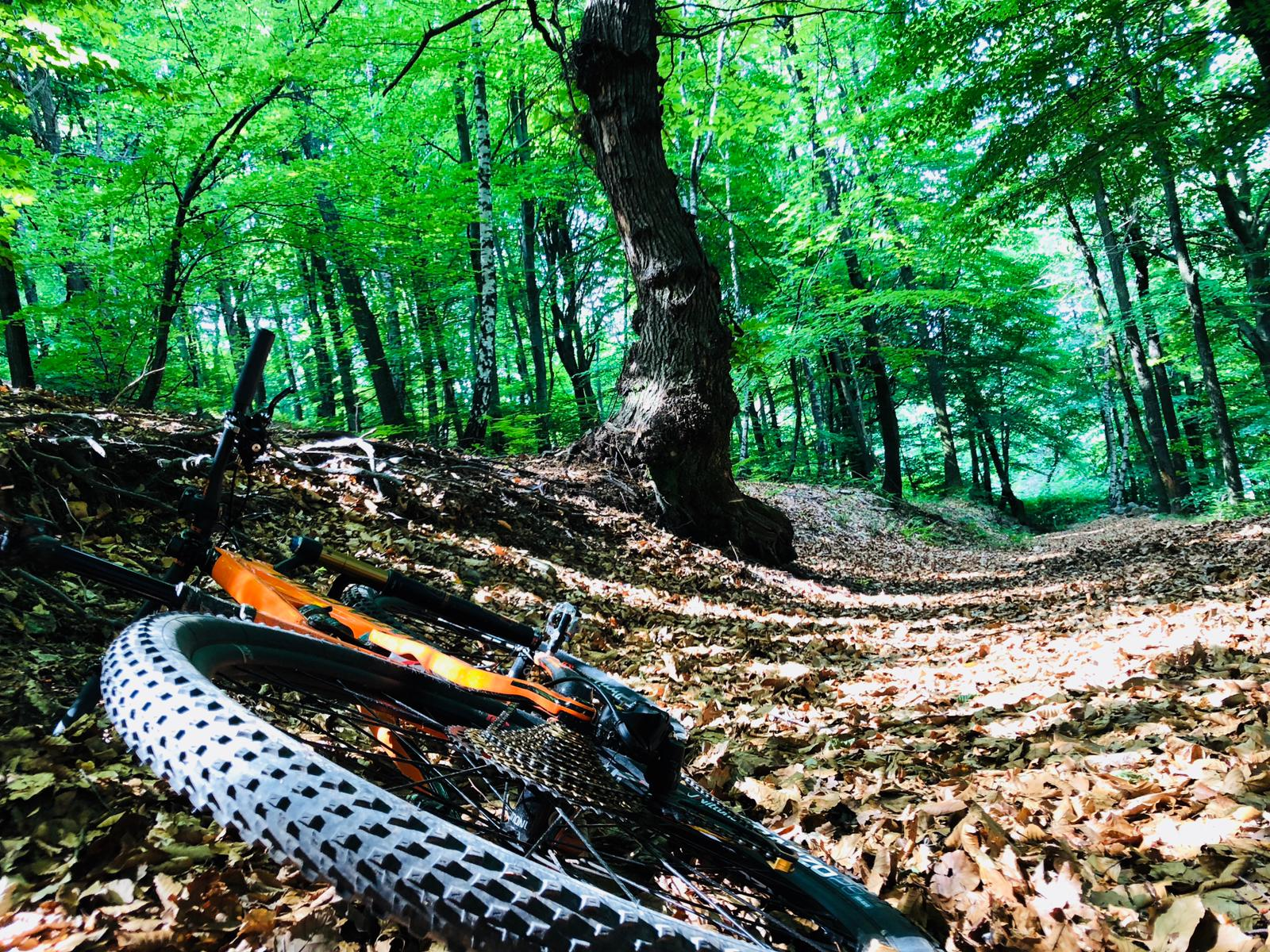
Picture of a Bike taken in one of the mountain paths

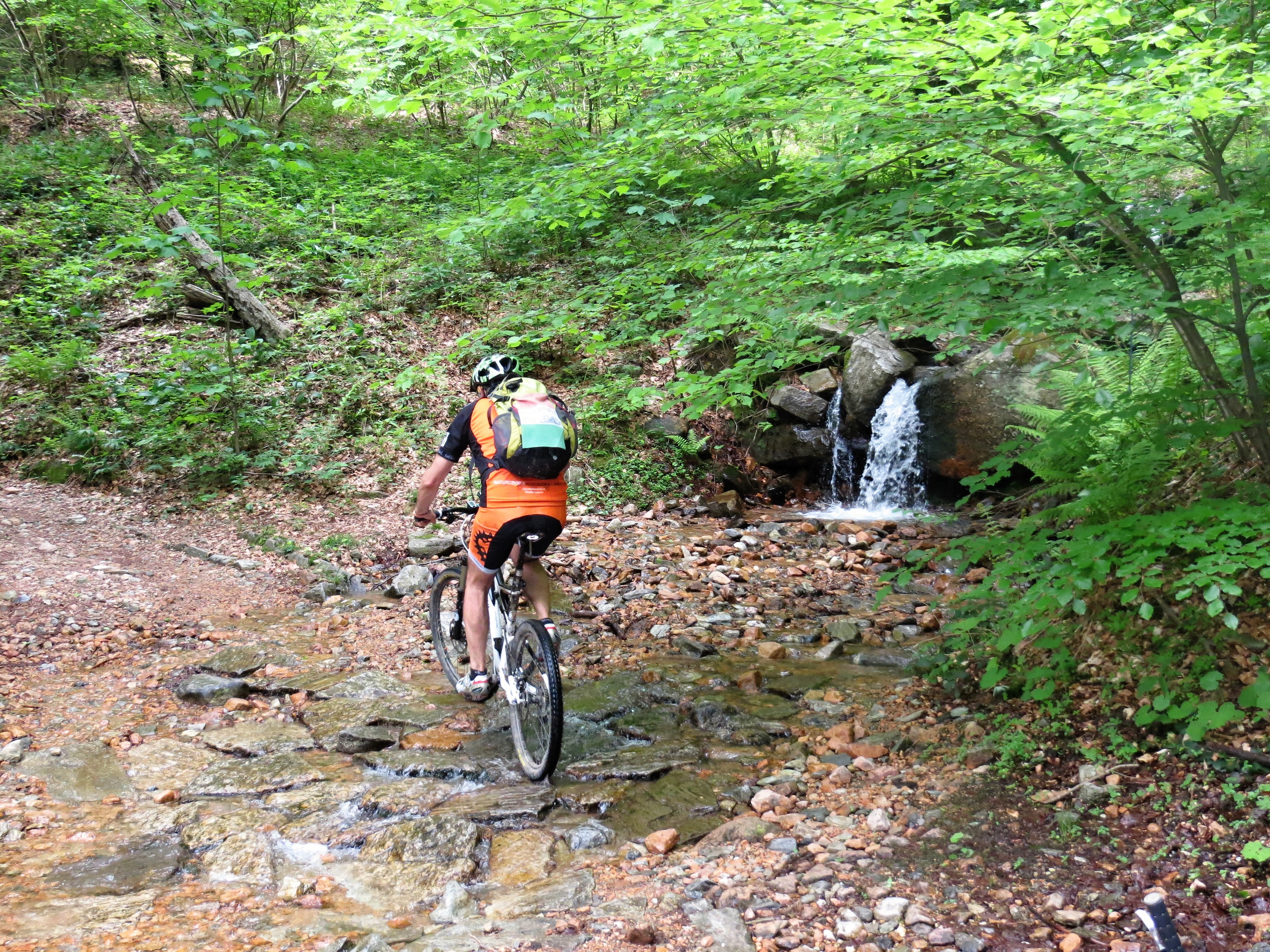
Biker in one of the mountain biking trail within the park

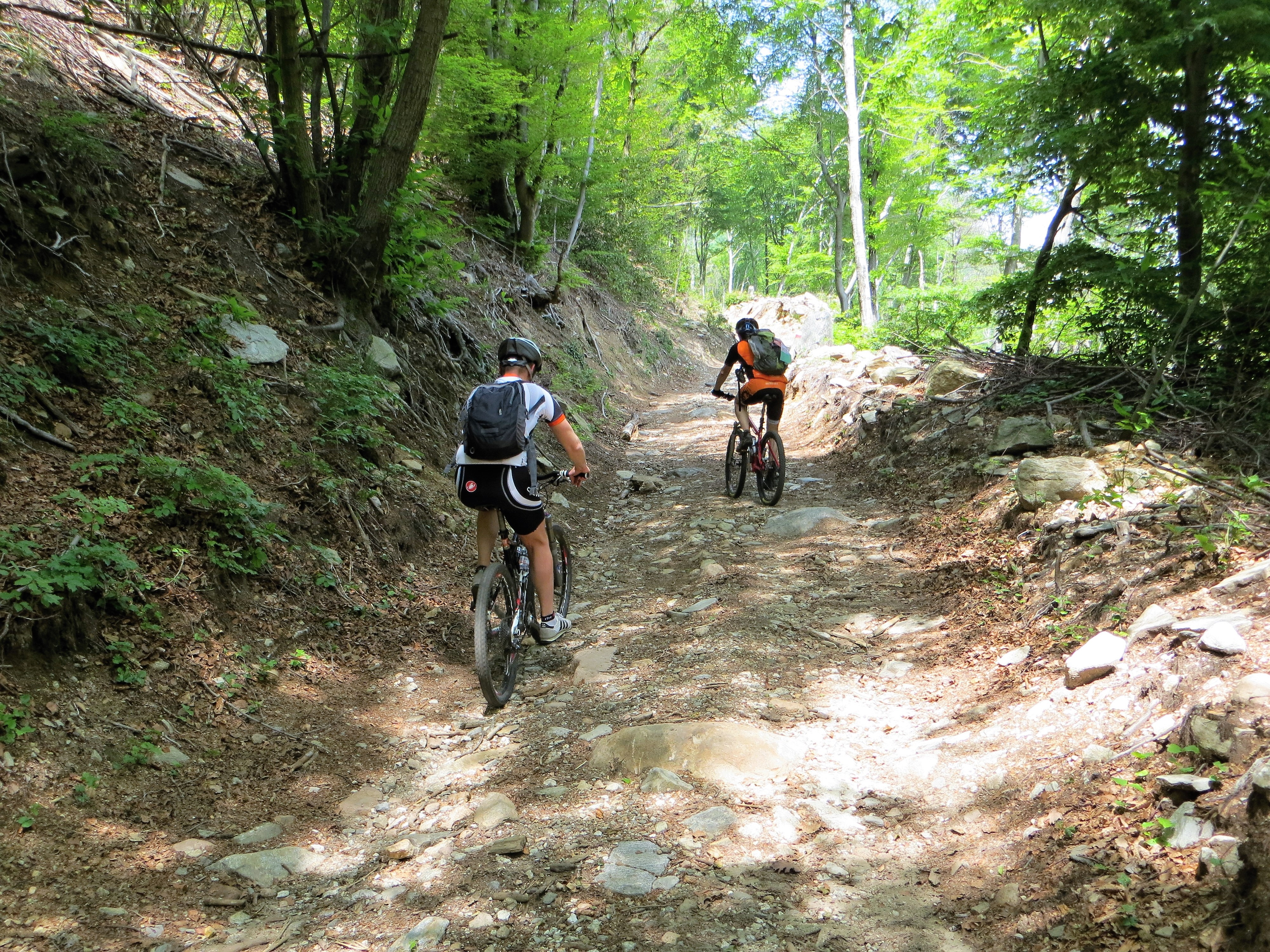
Picture of two bikers within the park

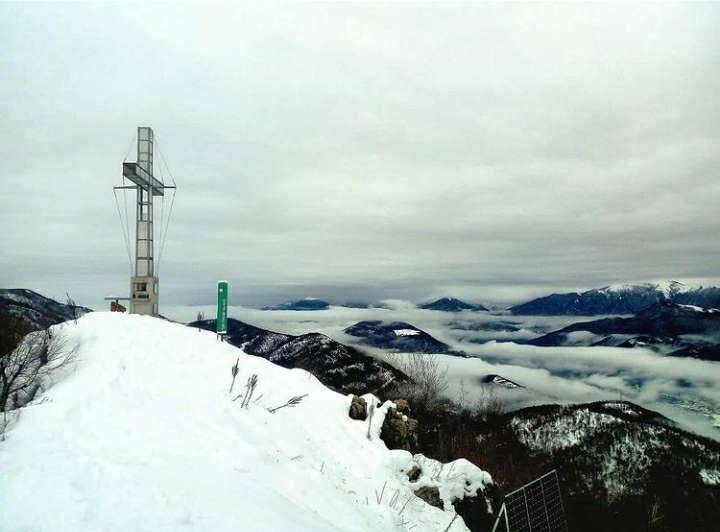
Picture taken at the summit of Mount Poncione (Winter 2020)

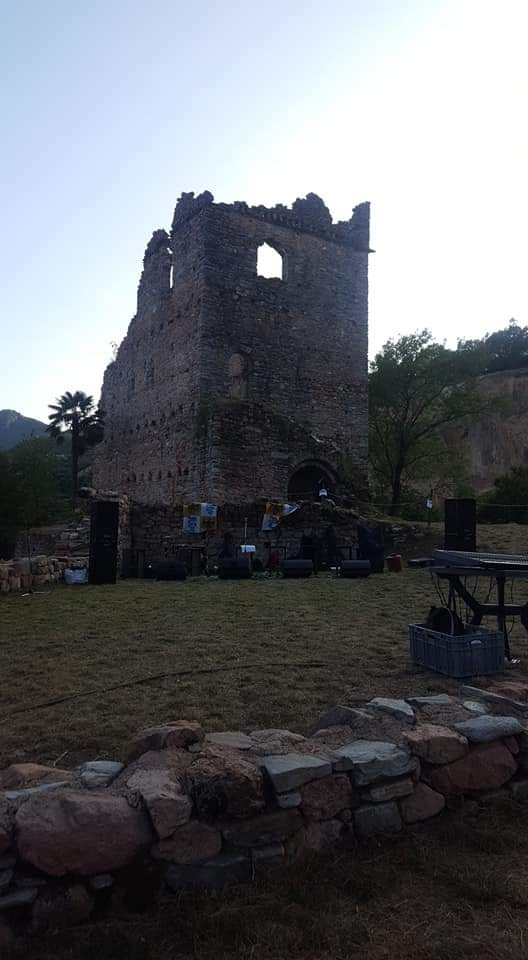
Picture of the Cuasso al Monte Caste ruins (Summer 2018)

.

== See also ==
- Trekking
- Mountain biking
- Mountain bike trials
- Cross Country Running
- Outdoor recreation
- Italian Alpine Club
- Campo dei Fiori
- Natural Park
- Lombardy
- Cuasso al Monte
- Marzio
- Valganna
- Canton Ticino
- Lake Maggiore
- Lake Lugano
- Lake Ganna
- Lake Ghirla
- Monte Piambello
- Monte Monarco
- Monte Pravello
- Monte San Giorgio
- Monte Generoso
- Cadorna Line
