= Comasche Prealps =

Mountain range in Switzerland and Italy

- Larian Prealps, eastern Lugano Prealps
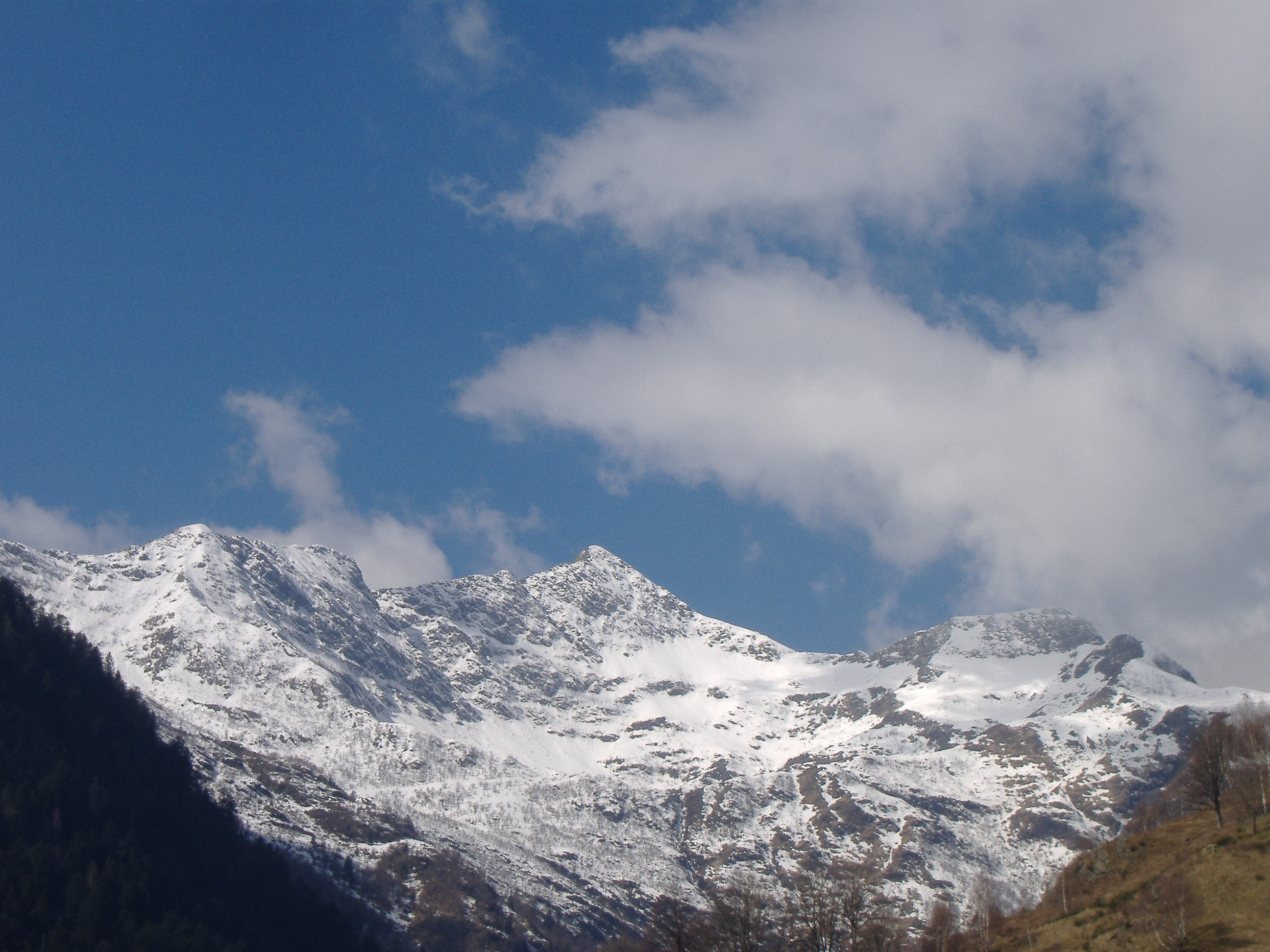
- Pizzo di Gino in the Comasche Prealps

Highest point
- Peak: Pizzo di Gino
- Elevation: 2,245 m (7,365 ft)

Naming
- Native name: Prealpi Comasche (Italian)

Geography
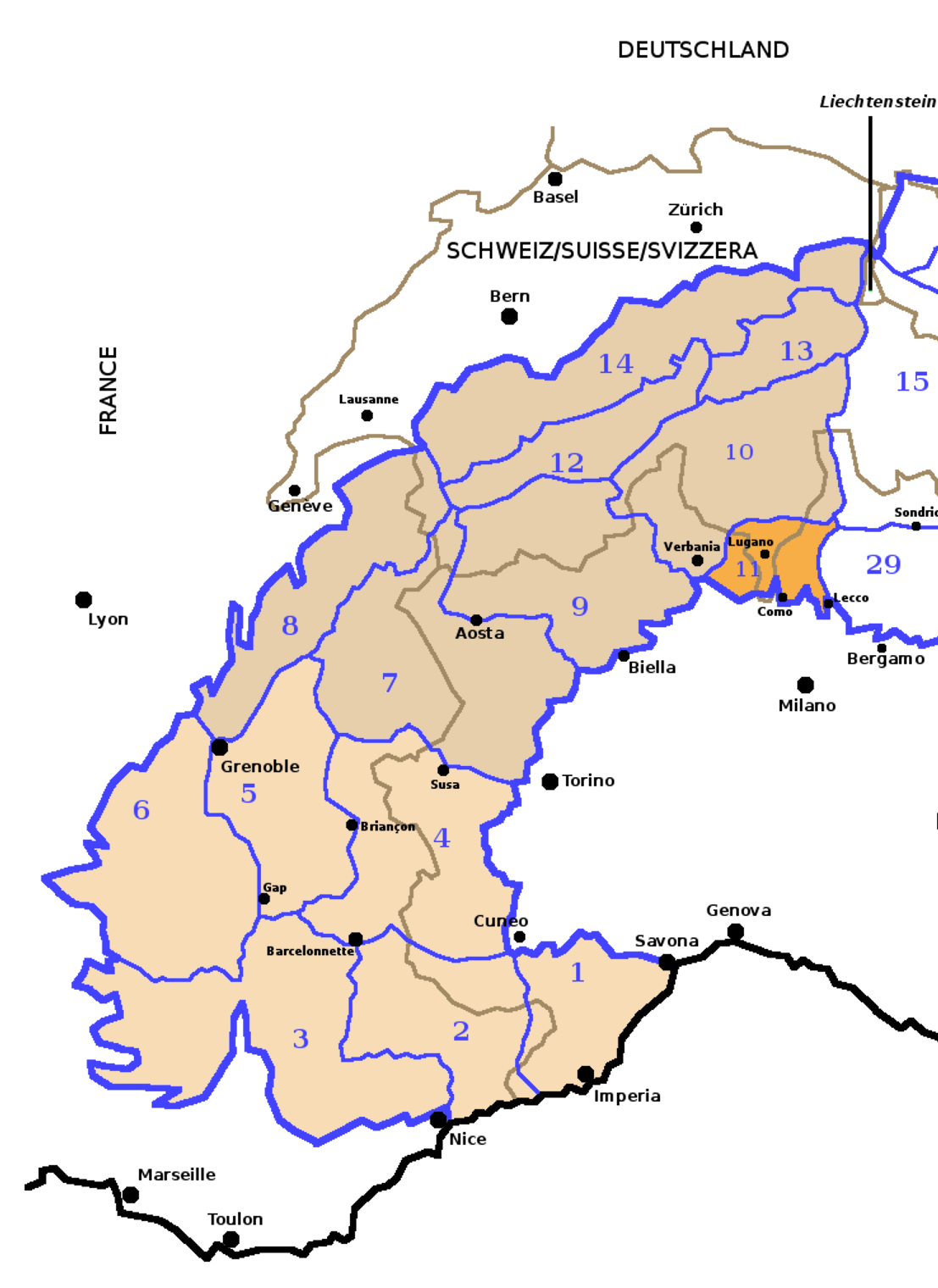
- The Comasche Prealps are within the Lugano Prealps (section no. 11), within the Western Alps
- Countries: Switzerland and Italy
- Canton, Region: Ticino and Lombardy
- Parent range: Alps
- Borders on: Bergamasque Alps and Prealps, Lepontine Alps, Western Rhaetian Alps and Po plain

Geology
- Orogeny: Alpine orogeny
- Rock type: Sedimentary rocks

The Comasche Prealps (also known as the Larian Prealps or the eastern Lugano Prealps) are a subsection of the Lugano Prealps. They are found in the Province of Como, Italy, and Canton Ticino, Switzerland. The highest peak is Pizzo di Gino which reaches 2,245 m (7,365 ft) above sea level.

They border:

- to the north with the Adula Alps (in the Lepontine Alps), separated by the San Jorio pass;
- to the east with the Orobic Alps and the Bergamasque Prealps (in the Bergamasque Alps and Prealps), separated by Lake Como;
- to the south they dissolve into the Po Valley;
- to the west with the Varese Prealps (in the same alpine section) and separated by the Monte Ceneri pass .

== Main peaks ==
The main mountains, arranged by descending elevation above sea level, are:

- Pizzo di Gino - 2,245 m
- Camoghè - 2,226 m
- Gazzirola - 2,116 m
- Monte Bregagno - 2,107 m
- Monte Bar - 1,814 m
- Cima di Fiorina - 1,810 m
- Monte Generoso - 1,701 m
- Monte di Tremezzo - 1,700 m
- Monte Galbiga - 1,698 m
- Monte San Primo - 1,685 m
- Denti della Vecchia - 1,492 m
- Pizzo della Croce - 1,491 m
- Palanzone - 1,436 m
- Sasso Gordona - 1,410 m
- Monte Colmegnone - 1,383 m
- Corni di Canzo - 1,373 m
- Monte Bisbino - 1,325 m
- Sighignola - 1,320 m
- Bollettone - 1,317 m
- Cornizzolo - 1,241 m
- Monte San Salvatore - 912 m
- Monte Sasso - 618 m
