= Geography of Lombardy =

Lombardy by altimetric zones

Lombardy is an administrative region of Italy that is split into four geographic regions — mountains, alpine forest, and the upper and lower plains south of the Po river. These are crossed and dotted by dozens of rivers and lakes, the latter of which include some of the largest in Italy. The territory is the fourth largest in Italy by surface area with 24,000 square kilometres (9,300 sq mi).

Lombardy's northern border is between the Valtellina and the valleys of the Rhine and the Inn. To the east, Lake Garda and the Mincio separate Lombardy from the other Italian regions, as does the Po in the south with the exception of the Mantuan and Pavese Oltrepò (lit. Beyond the Po). The western boundary is formed by the Lake Maggiore and the Ticino, except the Lomellina.

== Landscape ==
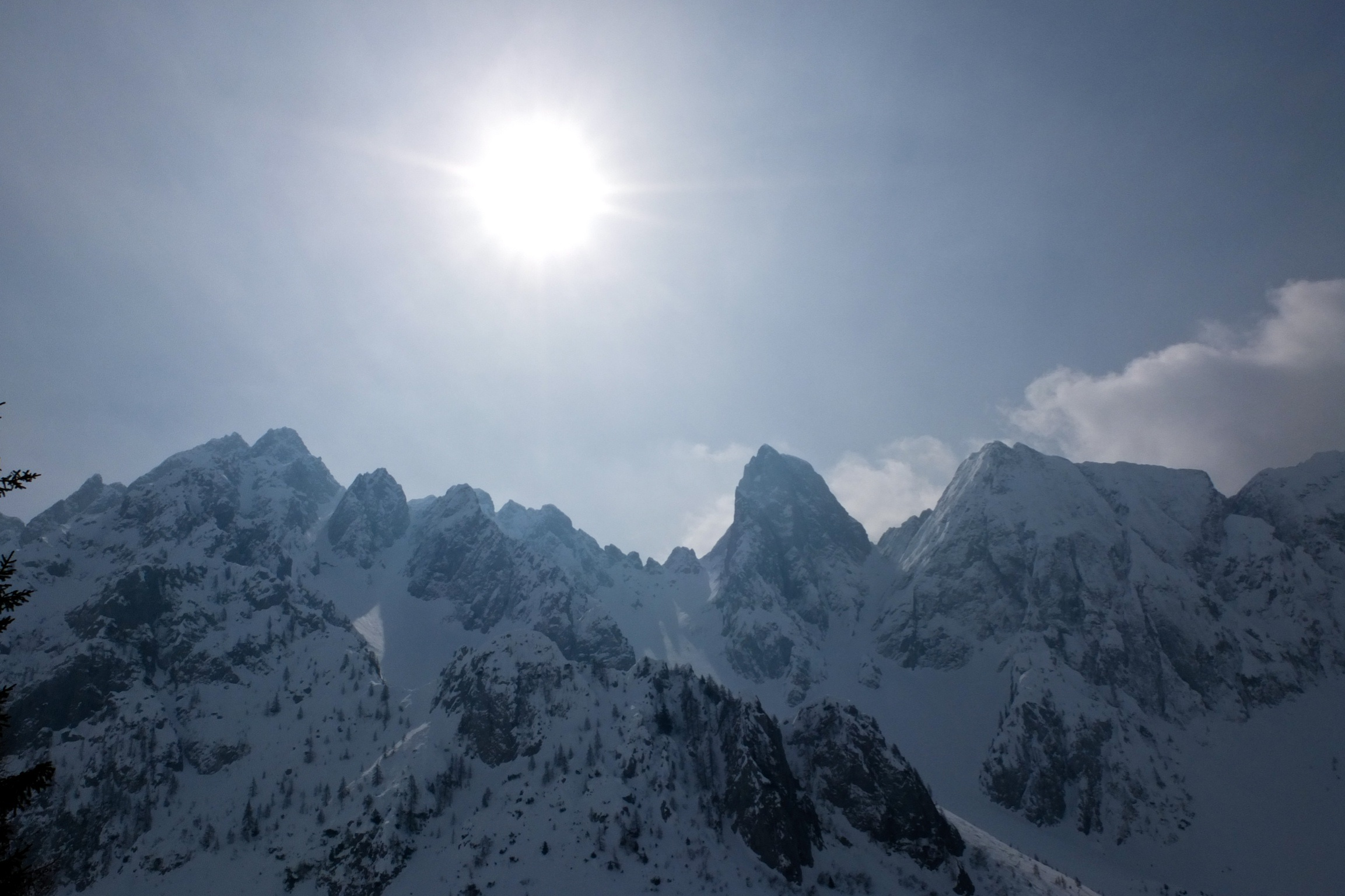
The Cimone della Bagozza, part of the Bergamasque Alps

Mountains make up 40 % of Lombardy's area. The Alps make up the northern section of Lombardy and then shrink into the Prealps, which themselves ease into hills and the valleys of the Po Valley. Along the Prealps are some of the largest lakes in Italy (Garda, Maggiore, and Como) while numerous rivers and streams (Po, Adda, Oglio, Mincio, and the Ticino) cut the mountains into deep and narrow valleys. In a small area of the Oltrepò Pavese rise hills and the Ligurian Apennines.

The Lombard Alps are all named after the ancient peoples who dwelled in them in the time of the Roman Empire. The Lepontine Alps are named for the Lepontii, the Rhaetian Alps for the Rhaetians, and the Orobie Alps for the Orobii. There are four prominent massifs in the Lombard Alps: the Bregaglia Range, Piz Bernina, Ortles-Cevedale Range, and the Adamello Range. The first three of these rise between the Rhine and Inn in the north and the Adda and Oglioto in the south and therefore are only partly in Italy. The Adamello Range on the other hand is located between the Adda and Adige and thus entirely within Italy. The highest elevated locality to be found in Lombardy is the secondary peak of the Piz Bernina, La Spedla, at 4,020 metres (13,190 ft). Another prominent peak is Monte Cevedale, standing 3,764-metre (12,349 ft) tall. The Forni glacier (12 km^{2} (4.6 sq mi)) is located in the Ortles-Cevedale Range.

To the west of Lake Maggiore and the east of Lake Garda are the Lombard Prealps, whose peaks average at a little over 2,500 metres (8,200 ft). They are made up primarily of calcerous sediments, which allowed glaciers to carve their many valleys and rivers now contained within. These glaciers also made the moraines that form the hilly terrain, making up 12.4% of the region, that connect the Prealps to the plains below.

=== Mountainous areas ===
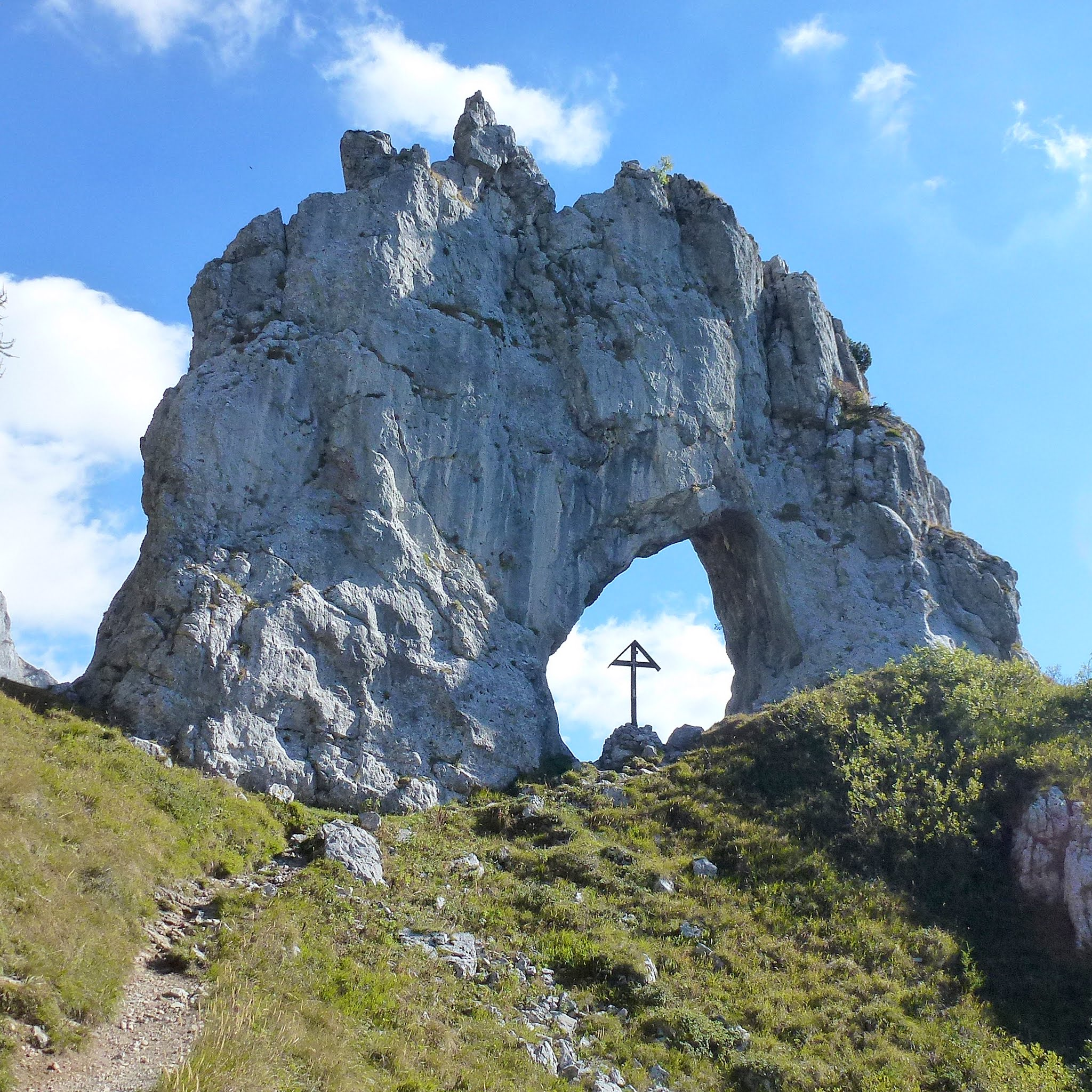
Porta di Prada, Grigna

- Lepontine Alps (Adula Alps)
- Lugano Prealps (Comasche Prealps, Varese Prealps)
- Western Rhaetian Alps (Platta Group, Bernina Alps, Livigno Alps, Sesvenna Alps)
- Southern Rhaetian Alps (Ortler Alps, Adamello-Presanella Alps)
- Bergamasque Alps and Prealps (Bergamasque Alps, Bergamasque Prealps)
- Brescia and Garda Prealps (Brescian Prealps, Garda Mountains)
- Ligurian Apennines

=== Mountains ===
- Monte Budellone
- Monte Ceresino

=== Alpine passes ===
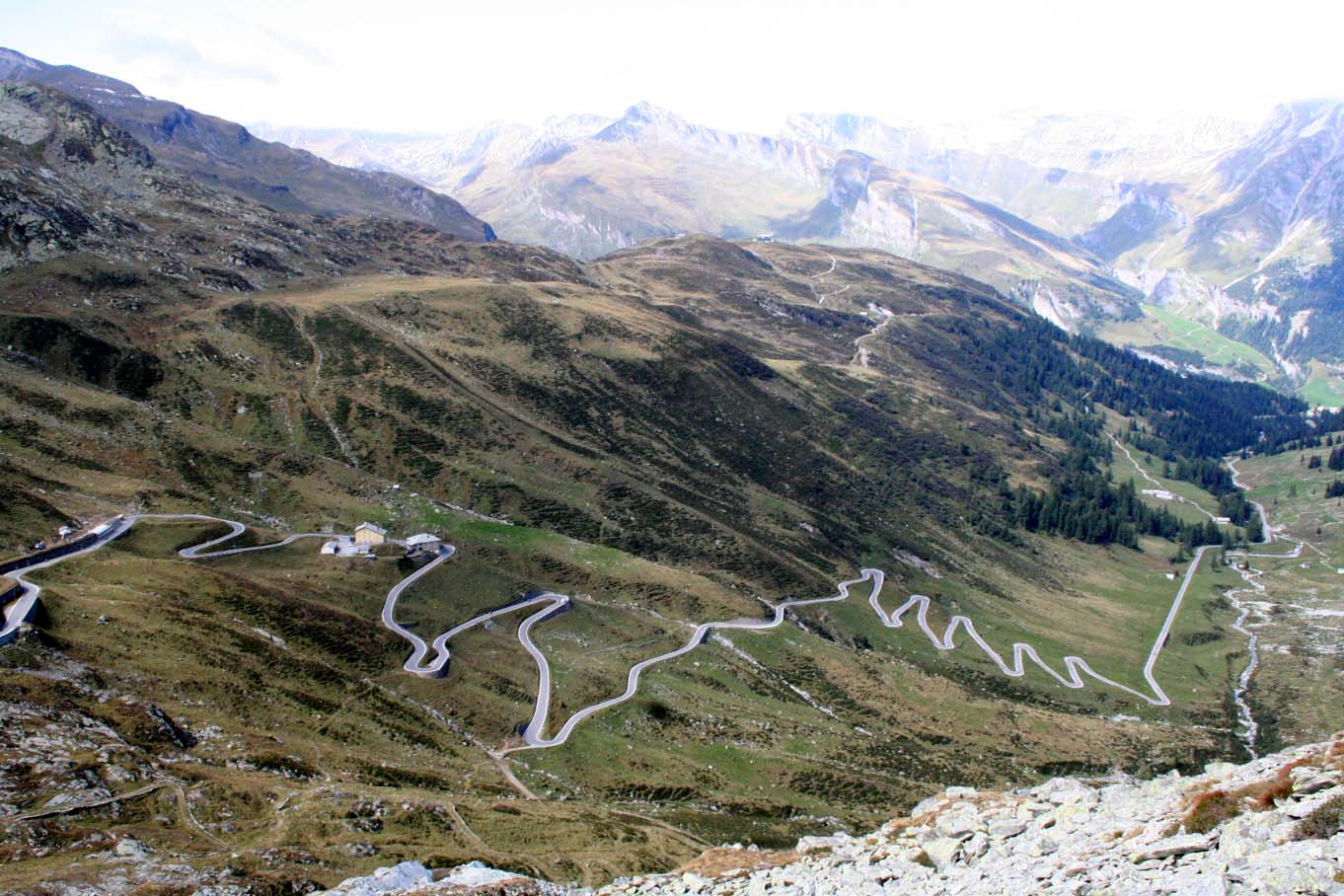
Northern slope of the Spluga Pass

Lombardy's alpine valleys are broader and deeper than those found in nearby Piedmont and the Aosta Valley. Because of their size, and in spite of their high altitude, the valleys of Lombardy are very accessible. Traffic through these passes has thus been constant in the region's history, especially commercial traffic.

The most important of these passes are those that connect Lombardy to Switzerland; the Splügen, Maloja, and the Bernina Passes, the latter two mostly within Swiss borders. Likewise, but intranationally, are the Stelvio and Tonale Passes between Lombardy and the Trentino.
