= Lago di Piano =

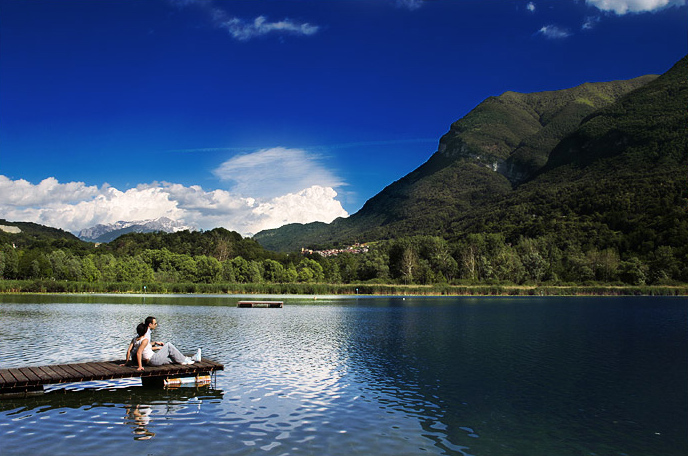

- Location within Lombardy
- Location: Province of Como, Lombardy
- Coordinates: 46°02′20″N 09°09′49″E
- Type: Natural freshwater lake
- Primary inflows: Torrente Civagno
- Primary outflows: Canale Lagadone
- Basin countries: Italy
- Max. length: 1.34 km (0.83 mi)
- Max. width: 0.75 km (0.47 mi)
- Surface area: 0.72 km^{2} (0.28 sq mi)
- Surface elevation: 276 m (906 ft)

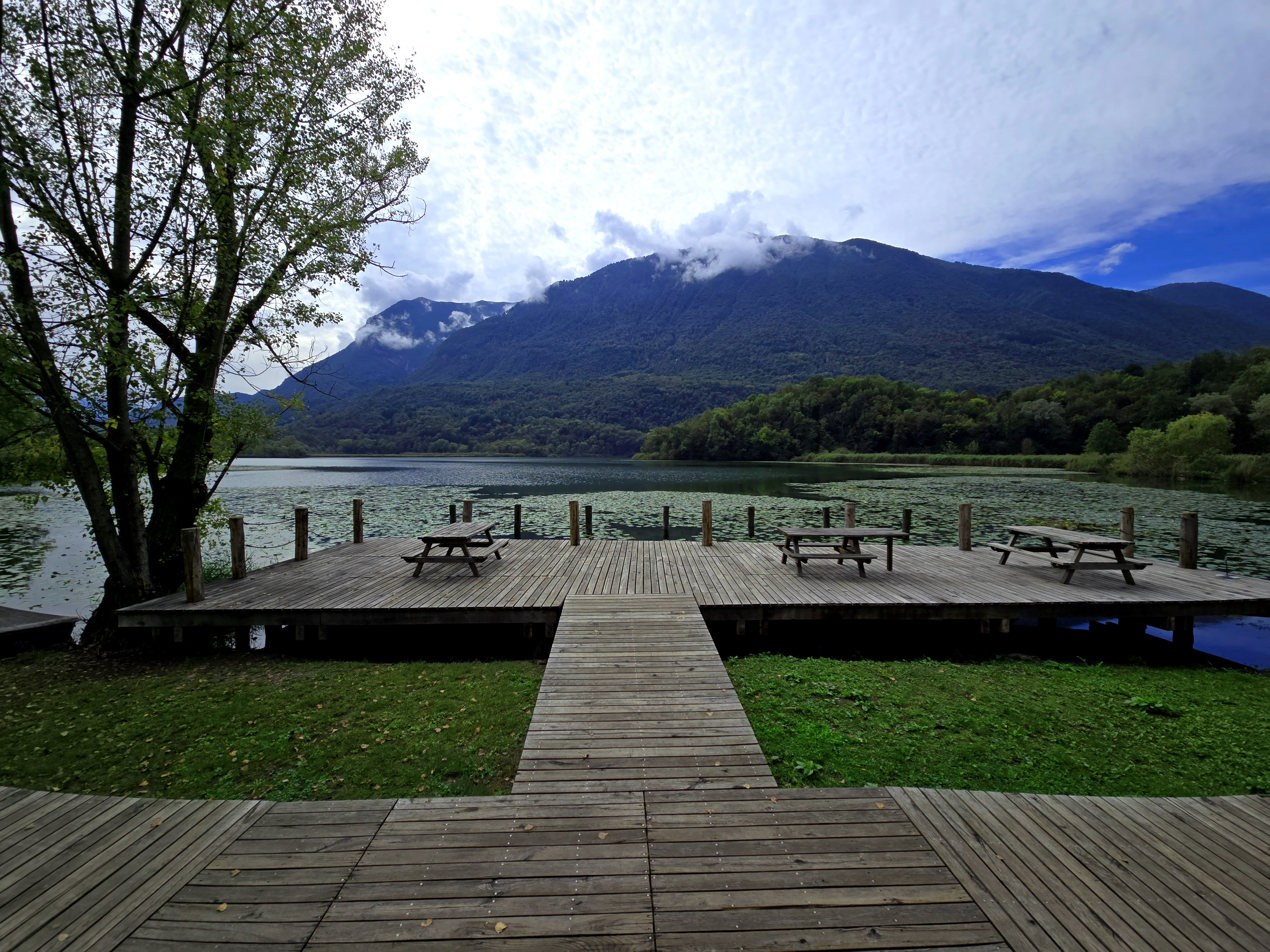
Carlazzo (Como): Lago di Piano

Lago di Piano is a lake in the Province of Como, Lombardy, Italy. It is a protected regional nature reserve and a breeding place for many types of water birds. At the foot of Monte Galbiga, It is situated in the Val Menaggio between Lake Como and Lake Lugano. At an elevation of 276 m (906 ft), its surface area is 0.72 km^{2} (0.28 sq mi).
