= Monte Bisbino =

Mountain in Italy

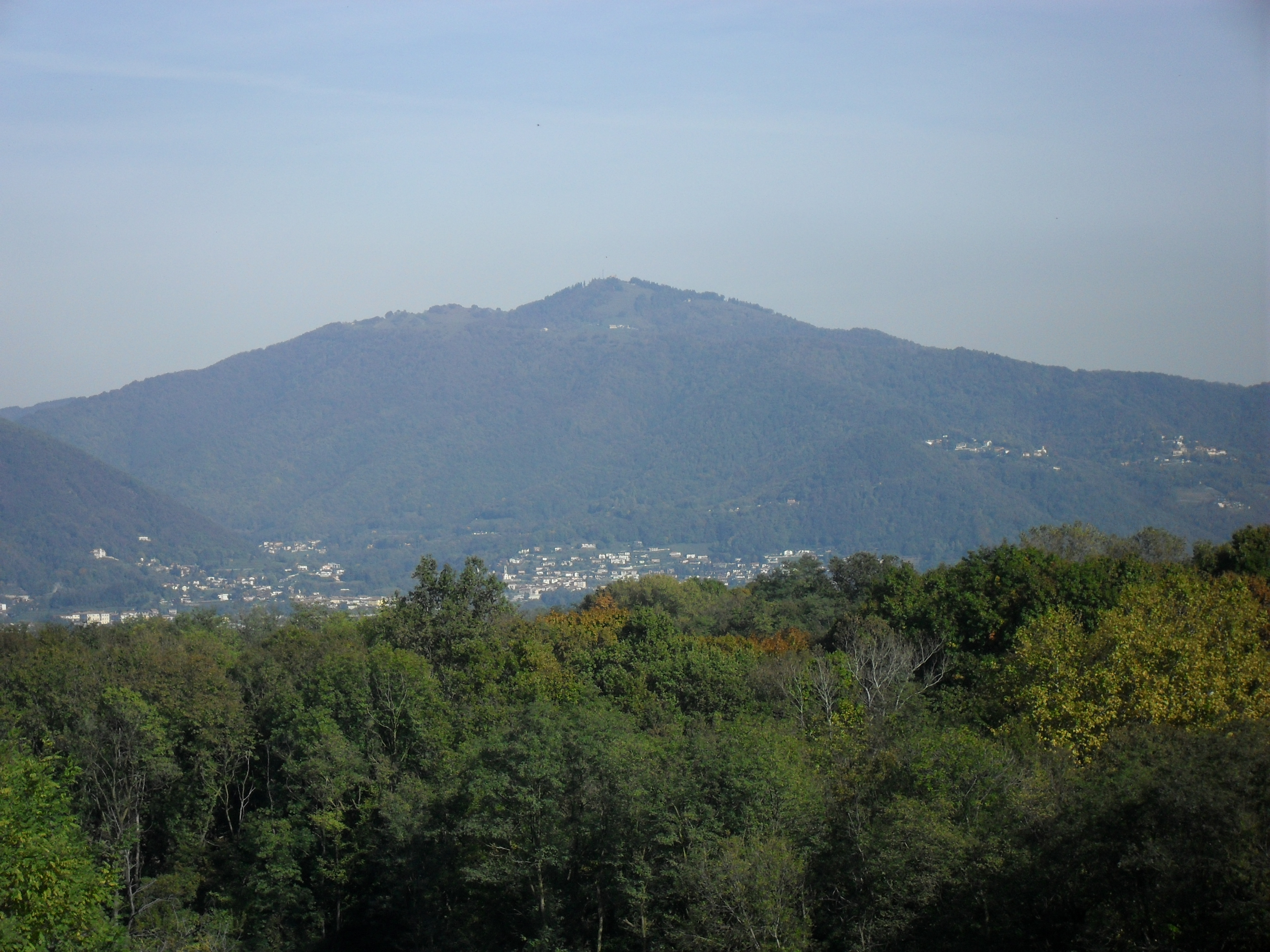

Highest point
- Elevation: 1,325 m (4,347 ft)
- Prominence: 206 m (676 ft)
- Parent peak: Sasso Gordona
- Isolation: 3.9 km (2.4 mi)
- Coordinates: 45°52′25″N 9°04′00″E

Geography
- Location within Alps
- Location: Lombardy, Italy (mountain partially in Switzerland)
- Parent range: Lugano Prealps

Monte Bisbino is a mountain of the Lugano Prealps, located west of Lake Como. It lies in the Italian region of Lombardy, just 200 metres south of the Swiss border with the canton of Ticino. It has an elevation of 1,325 metres above sea level, the Swiss border reaching a height of 1,244 metres.

Monte Bisbino can be reached with a paved road from Cernobbio (Italy). A church lies on the top.
