= Grona =

Grona may refer to:

- Gröna, a village and a former municipality in Saxony-Anhalt, Germany
- Monte Grona, a mountain in Lombardy, Italy
- Grona, a fortress and imperial palace in Göttingen, built in 915 and razed in 1387
- Grona (plant), a plant genus
