= Monte Moregallo =

Mountain in Italy

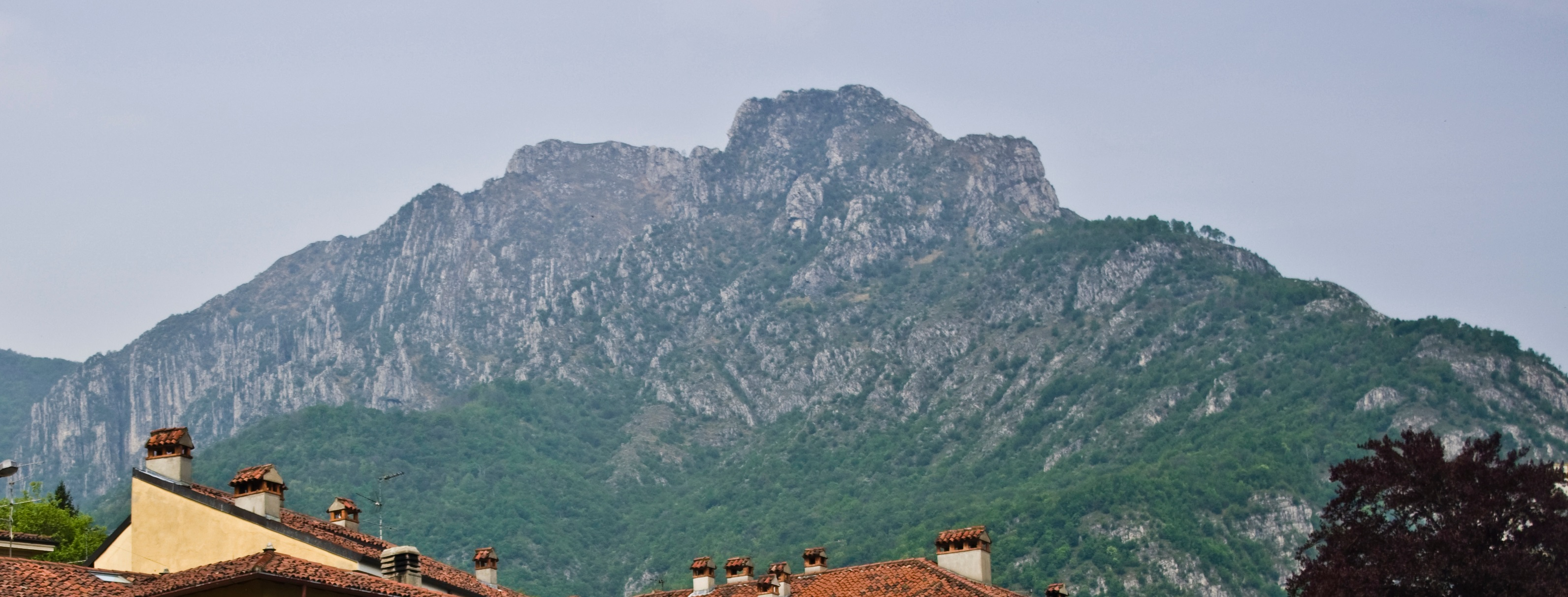
- Moregallo seen from Malgrate

Highest point
- Elevation: 1,276 m (4,186 ft)
- Prominence: 168 m (551 ft)
- Coordinates: 45°52′00″N 9°20′23″E

Geography
- Location within Lombardy
- Location: Lombardy, Italy
- Parent range: Comasche Prealps

Monte Moregallo is a mountain of Lombardy, Italy, with an elevation of 1,276 metres (4,186 ft). It is located in the Comasche Prealps, in the Province of Lecco, between Valmadrera and Mandello del Lario.

Moregallo forms the eastern corner of the Larian Triangle, and is located between Lake Como and the Corni di Canzo. It has three faces, the wooded northern face and the more rugged southern and eastern faces.

The peak can be reached through a long, difficult hike from Valmadrera and Mandello del Lario.
