= Denti della Vecchia =

Mountain in Switzerland

- Sasso Grande
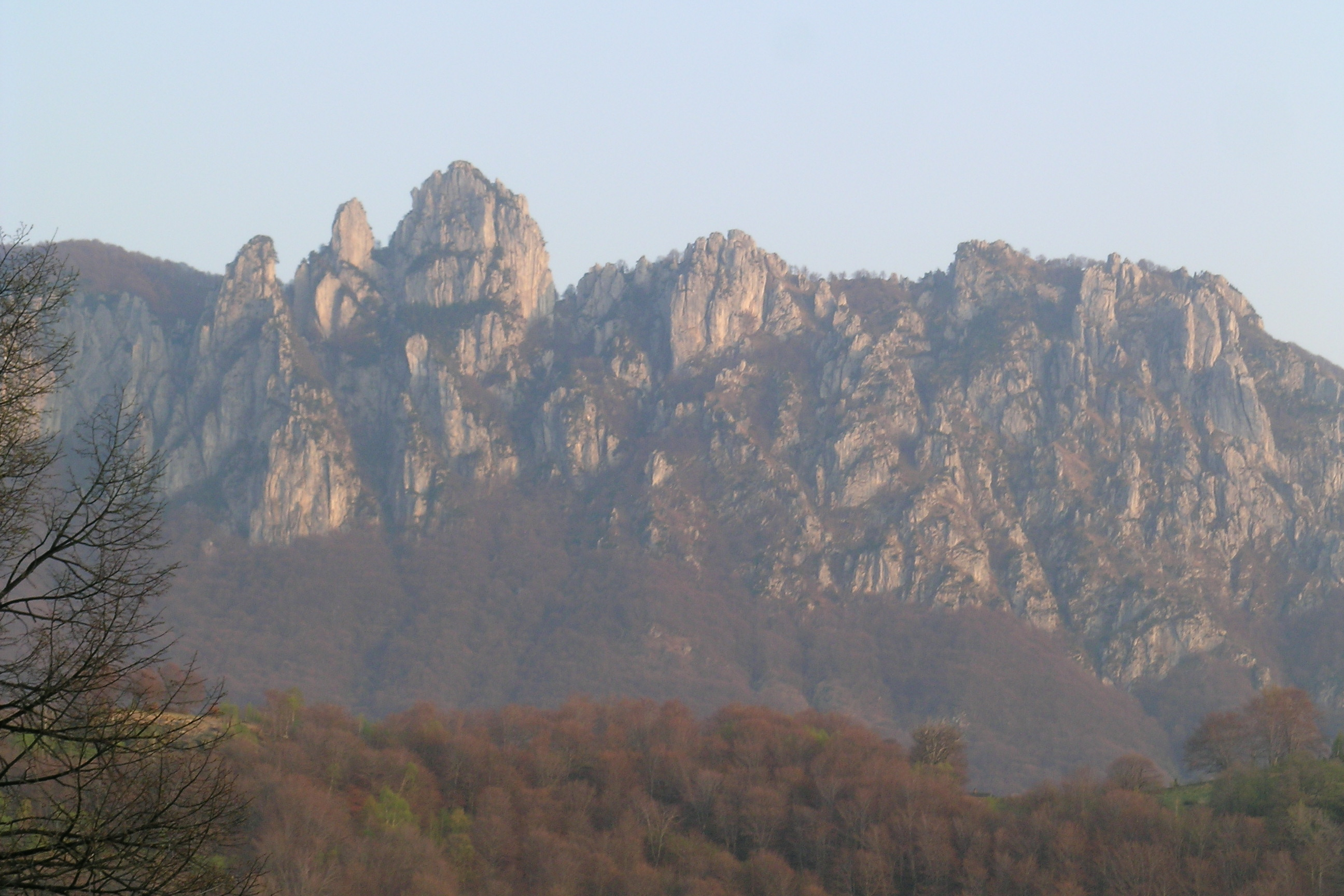
- The north-west side

Highest point
- Elevation: 1,491 m (4,892 ft)
- Prominence: 92 m (302 ft)
- Coordinates: 46°3′10″N 9°1′23″E

Geography
- Location within Alps
- Location: Lombardy, Italy; Ticino, Switzerland
- Parent range: Lugano Prealps

The Denti della Vecchia (1,491 m) (lit. "teeth of the old woman") are a mountain of the Lugano Prealps, located north of Lake Lugano on the border between Italy and Switzerland. They are composed of several summits of which the highest is named Sasso Grande.
