= Ramponio Verna =

- Frazione
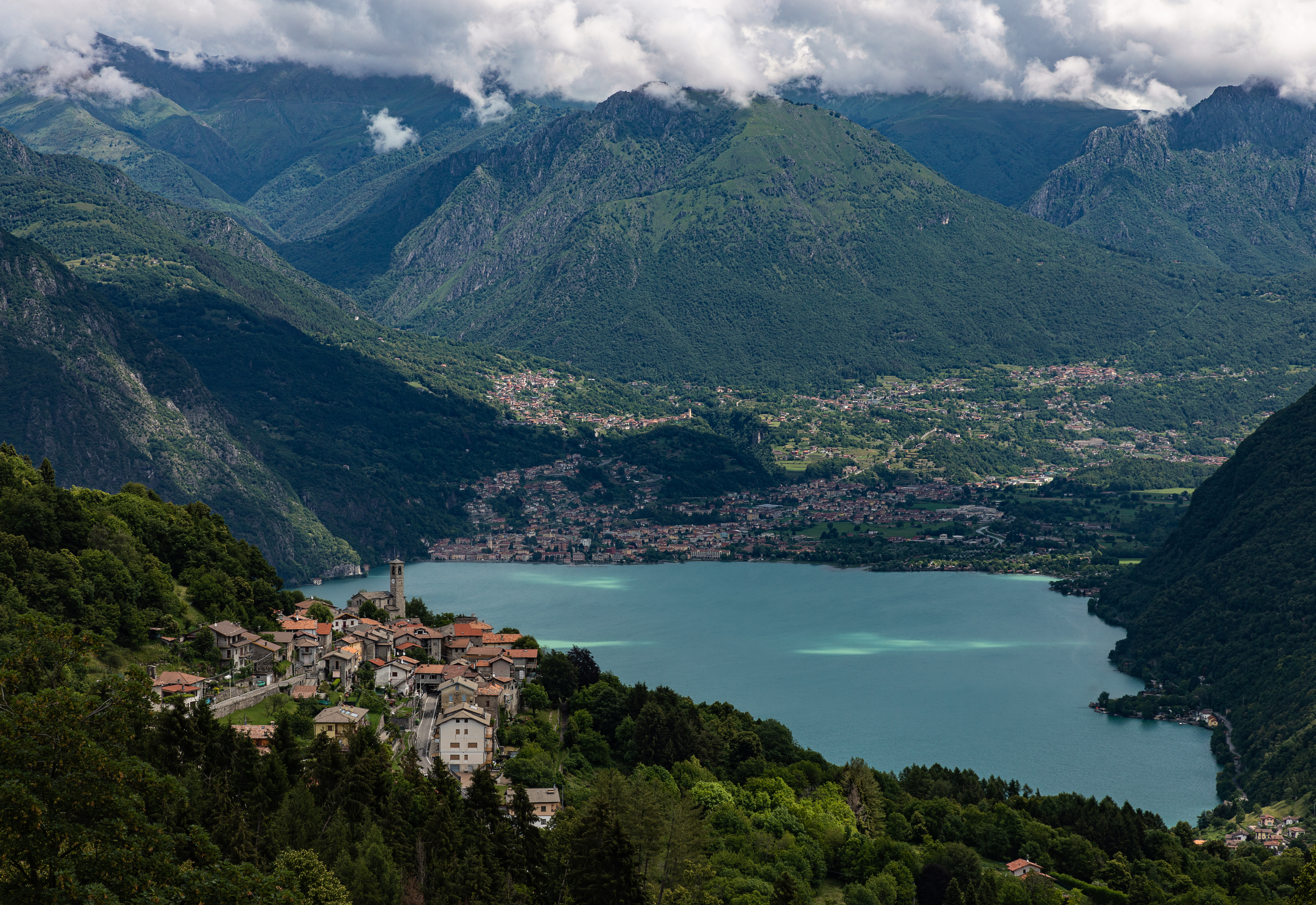

- Location of Ramponio Verna in Italy
- Coordinates: 45°59′N 9°4′E
- Country: Italy
- Region: Lombardy
- Province: Province of Como (CO)
- Comune: Alta Valle Intelvi

Area
  - Total: 4.9 km^{2} (1.9 sq mi)
- Elevation: 705 m (2,313 ft)

Population (Dec. 2004)
  - Total: 420
  - Density: 86/km^{2} (220/sq mi)
- Time zone: UTC+1 (CET)
  - Summer (DST): UTC+2 (CEST)
- Postal code: 22020
- Dialing code: 031

Ramponio Verna was a comune (municipality) in the Province of Como in the Italian region Lombardy, located about 60 kilometres (37 mi) north of Milan and about 20 kilometres (12 mi) north of Como. It's a frazione of Alta Valle Intelvi since 2017 and as of 31 December 2004, it had a population of 420 and an area of 4.9 square kilometres (1.9 mi^{2}).
