= Pellio Intelvi =

- Frazione
- Location of Pellio Intelvi in Italy
- Coordinates: 45°59′N 9°4′E
- Country: Italy
- Region: Lombardy
- Province: Como (CO)
- Comune: Alta Valle Intelvi

Area
  - Total: 10.2 km^{2} (3.9 sq mi)
- Elevation: 1,010 m (3,310 ft)

Population (31 December 2004)
  - Total: 938
  - Density: 92.0/km^{2} (238/sq mi)
- Time zone: UTC+1 (CET)
  - Summer (DST): UTC+2 (CEST)
- Postal code: 22020
- Dialing code: 031

Pellio Intelvi was a comune (municipality) in the Province of Como in the Italian region Lombardy, located about 60 kilometres (37 mi) north of Milan and about 20 kilometres (12 mi) north of Como, on the border with Switzerland. It is divided in two distinct centers, Pellio Inferiore (or Pelsotto) and Pellio Superiore (Pelsopra). It has been a frazione of Alta Valle Intelvi since 2017.

It is the birthplace of the Baroque sculptor Ercole Ferrata and of the architects Domenico Corbellini (18th century) and Carlo Lurago.

== Main sights ==
- Baroque Oratory of the Madonna del Fiume
- Church of St. George, with Baroque frescoes and stuccoes
- Church of St Michael Archangel
