= Monte Pian Nave =

Mountain in Italy

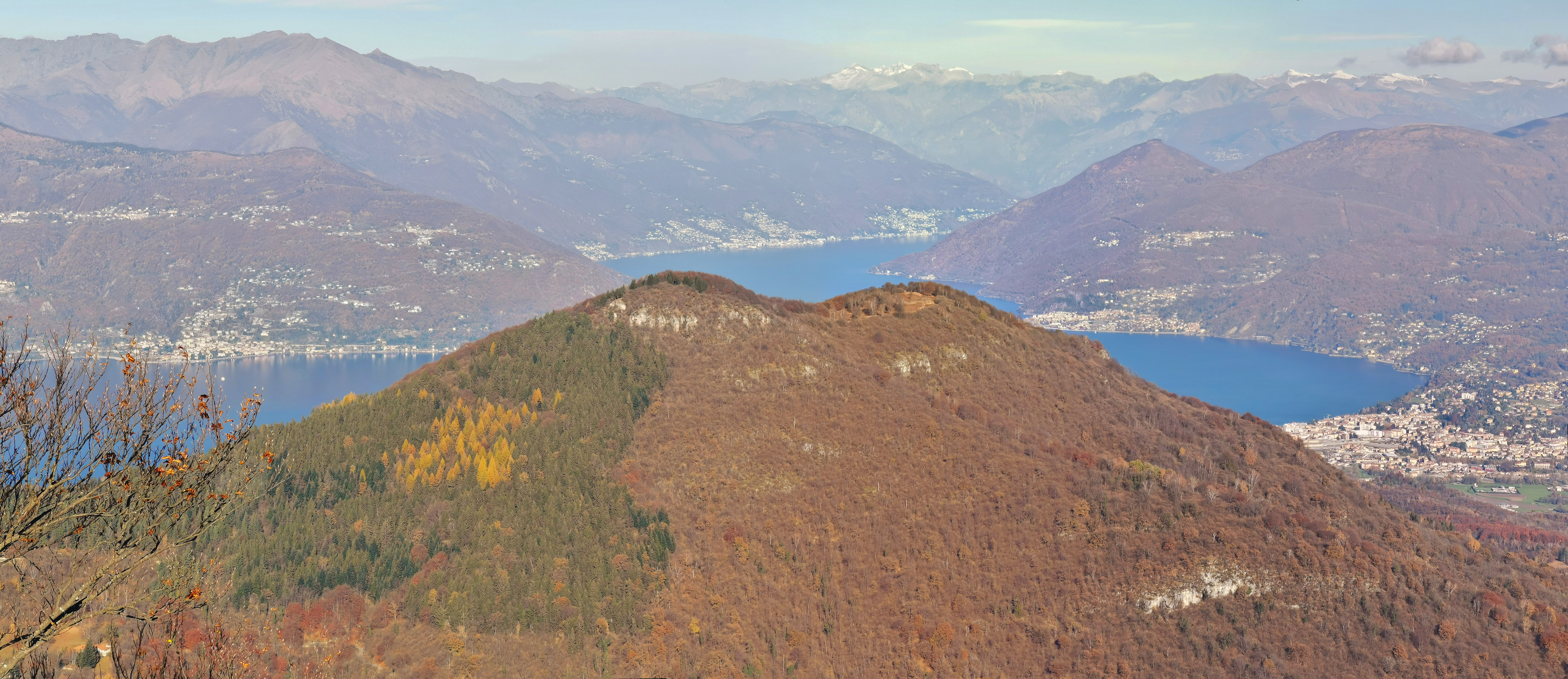

Highest point
- Elevation: 1,058 m (3,471 ft)
- Prominence: 238 m (781 ft)
- Coordinates: 45°56′56″N 8°43′10″E

Geography
- Location within Lombardy Location within Italy
- Location: Lombardy, Italy

Monte Pian Nave is a mountain located in Lombardy, Italy. It has an elevation of 1,058 metres (3,471 ft) above sea level. It is part of the Varese Prealps subgroup of the Lugano Prealps.
