= Monte Colmegnone =

Mountain in Italy

- Poncione di Laglio
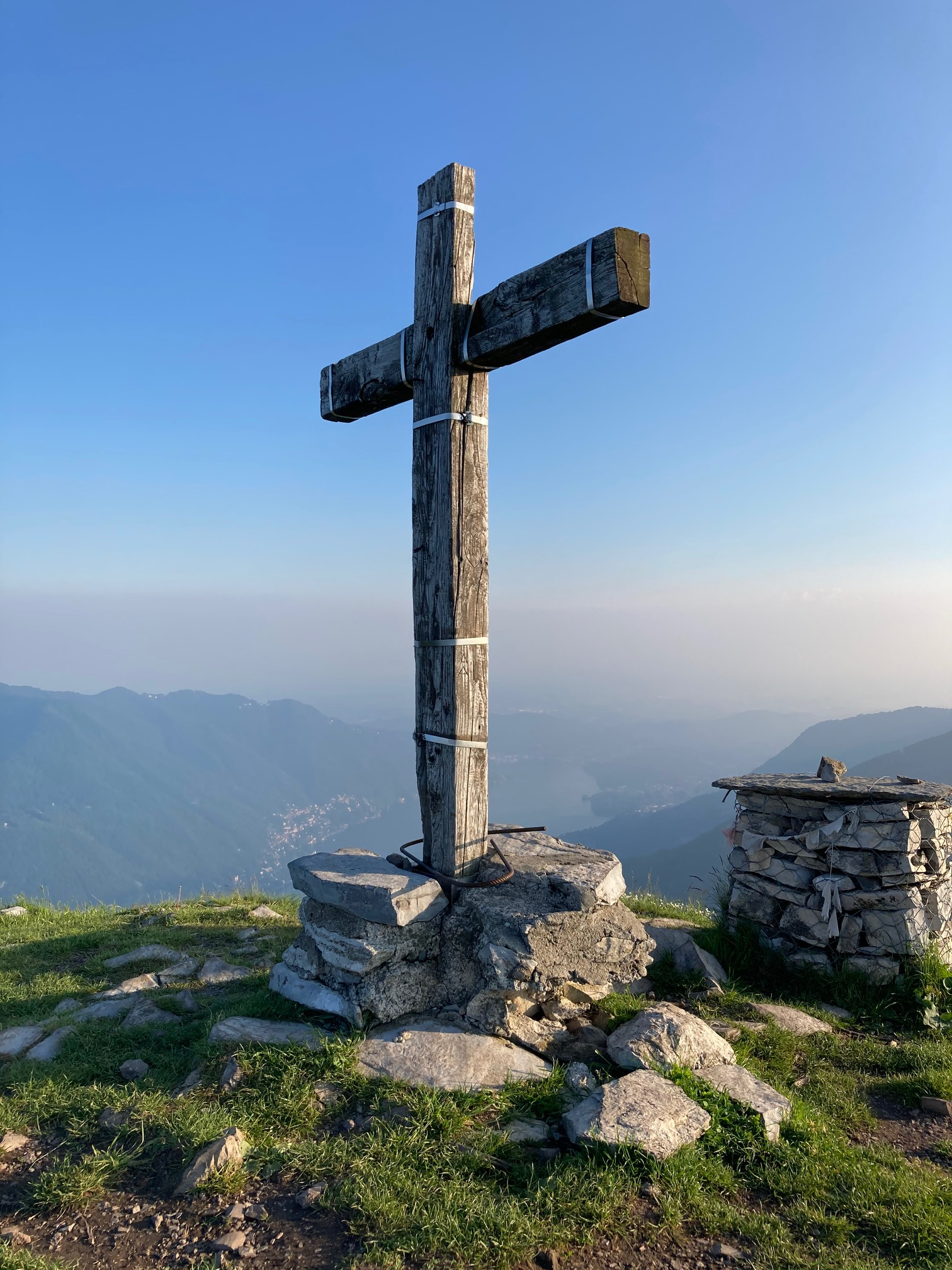
- The summit cross

Highest point
- Elevation: 1,383 m (4,537 ft)
- Listing: Mountains of Italy
- Coordinates: 45°53′33″N 9°07′06″E

Geography
- Location within Lombardy
- Location: Lombardy, Italy
- Parent range: Comasche Prealps

Monte Colmengone, also known as Poncione di Laglio, is a mountain of Lombardy, Italy, with an elevation of 1,383 metres (4,537 ft). It is located in the Comasche Prealps, in the Province of Como, between the municipalities of Carate Urio, Moltrasio and Laglio.

== Details ==
A private road reaches the summit from Rifugio Murelli, while ancient dirt roads allow to reach it from Laglio and Carate Urio. The peak offers a panoramic view over the southern part of Lake Como, Monte Rosa, the Matterhorn and the Bernese Alps.

Monte Colmegnone is partly covered in oak and beech woods, and inhabited by groups of chamoises.
