= Colle di Brianza =

Mountain in Italy

Coordinates: 45°49′12″N 9°24′02″E

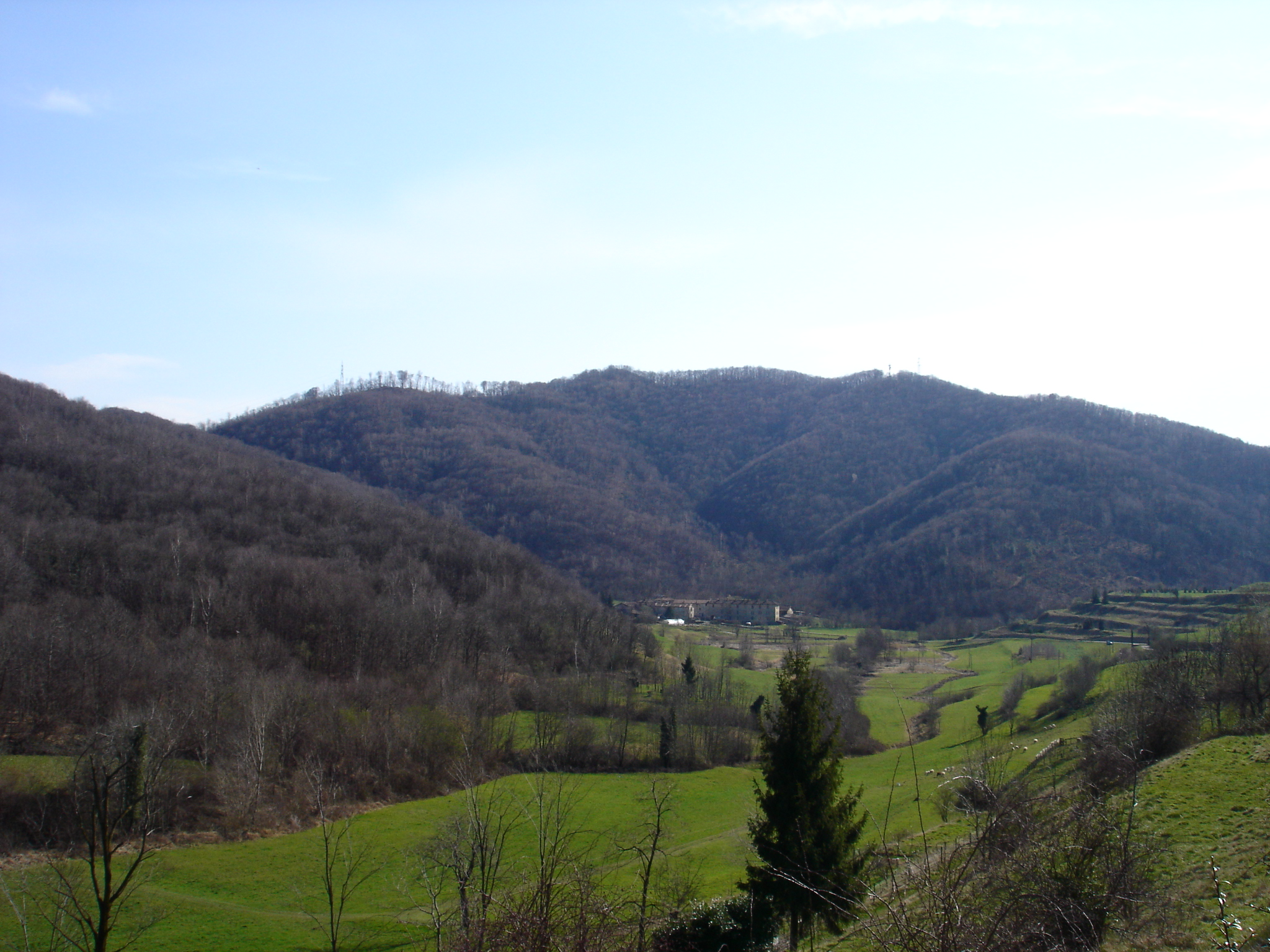

Highest point
- Elevation: 877 m (2,877 ft)

Geography
- Location: Lombardy, Italy

Colle di Brianza is a mountain in Lombardy, Italy. It has an elevation of 877 metres (2,877 ft).

Colle di Brianza, also known as Monte di San Genesio, is a mountain in the Lugano Prealps located in the province of Lecco. It is divided into three hills: Monte Regina (817 m above sea level), Monte Crocione (877 m above sea level), and Monte di San Genesio (832 m above sea level).

The Hermitage of San Genesio is located on Monte di San Genesio. From the late 1500s to 1770, it was inhabited by Augustinian friars. After a period of abandonment, it returned to its religious function thanks to the Camaldolese friars, who, from 1863 to 1938, rebuilt the convent and church, dedicating it to Saint Joseph. Today, the hermitage is privately owned.

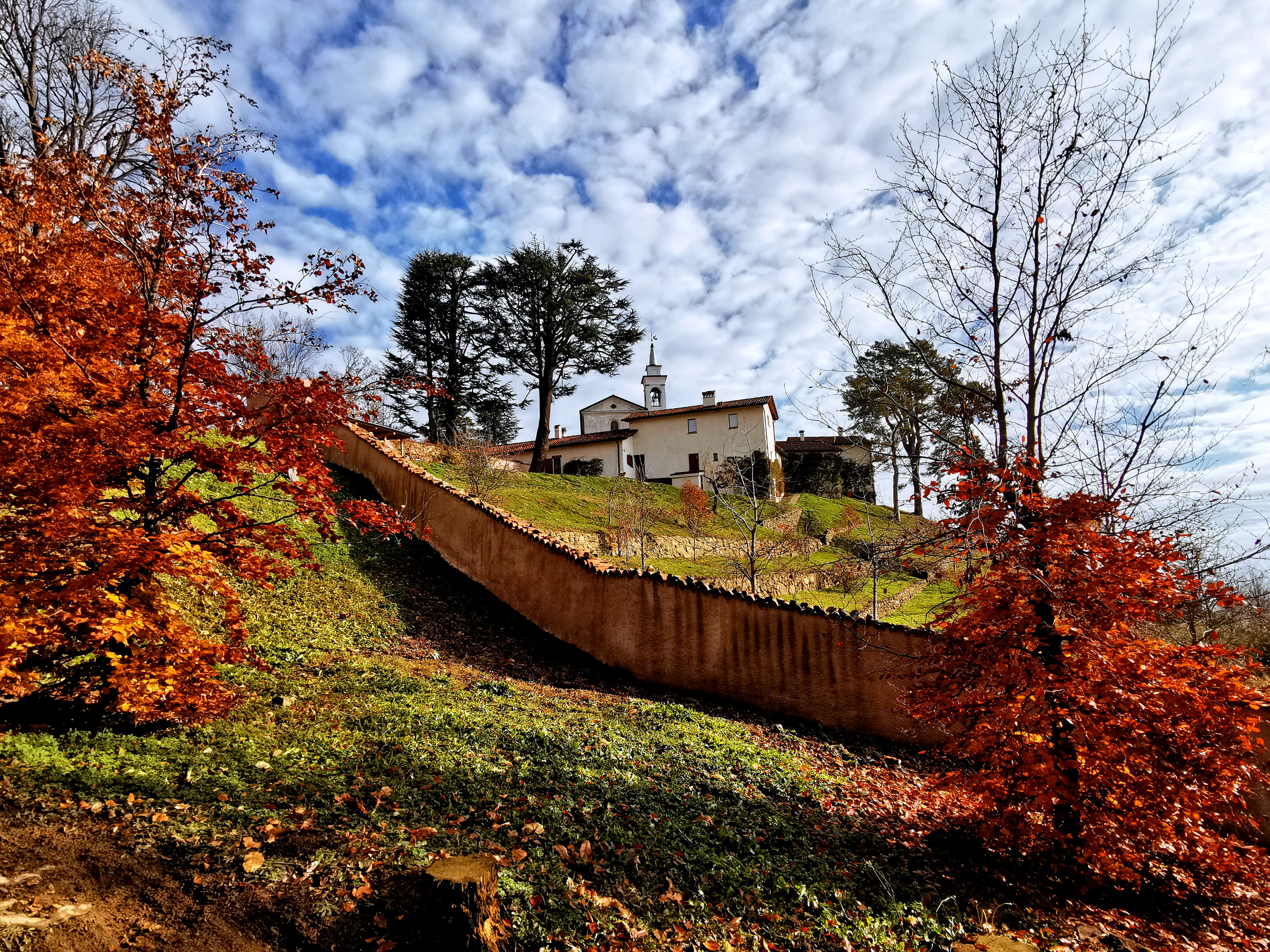
Hermitage of San Genesio on Monte di San Genesio
