= Alta Valle Intelvi =

- Comune
- Comune di Alta Valle Intelvi
- Location within Italy Location within Lombardy
- Coordinates: 45°59′05.28″N 9°1′37.56″E
- Country: Italy
- Region: Lombardy
- Province: Como (CO)
- Frazioni: Lanzo d'Intelvi, Pellio Intelvi, Ramponio, Scaria, Verna

Government
  - Mayor: Marcello Grandi

Area
  - Total: 24.95 km^{2} (9.63 sq mi)
- Elevation: 907 m (2,976 ft)

Population (31 August 2017)
  - Total: 2,939
  - Density: 117.8/km^{2} (305.1/sq mi)
- Time zone: UTC+1 (CET)
  - Summer (DST): UTC+2 (CEST)
- Postal code: 22024 and 22020
- Dialing code: 031
- Website: Official website

Alta Valle Intelvi is a comune (municipality) in the Province of Como in the Italian region Lombardy. It was created on 1 January 2017 after the merger of the former comuni of Lanzo d'Intelvi, Pellio Intelvi and Ramponio Verna.

== Main sights ==
The Balcone d'Italia, located in the area of Lanzo d'Intelvi, is a mountain view-point with extensive views over Lake Lugano and the city of Lugano, to the high Alps. It can be reached by road from Lanzo d'Intelvi.

To find out everything to see and do in Alta Valle Intelvi, visit the official tourism website: www.visitaltavalleintelvi.com
