= Camoghè =

Mountain in Switzerland

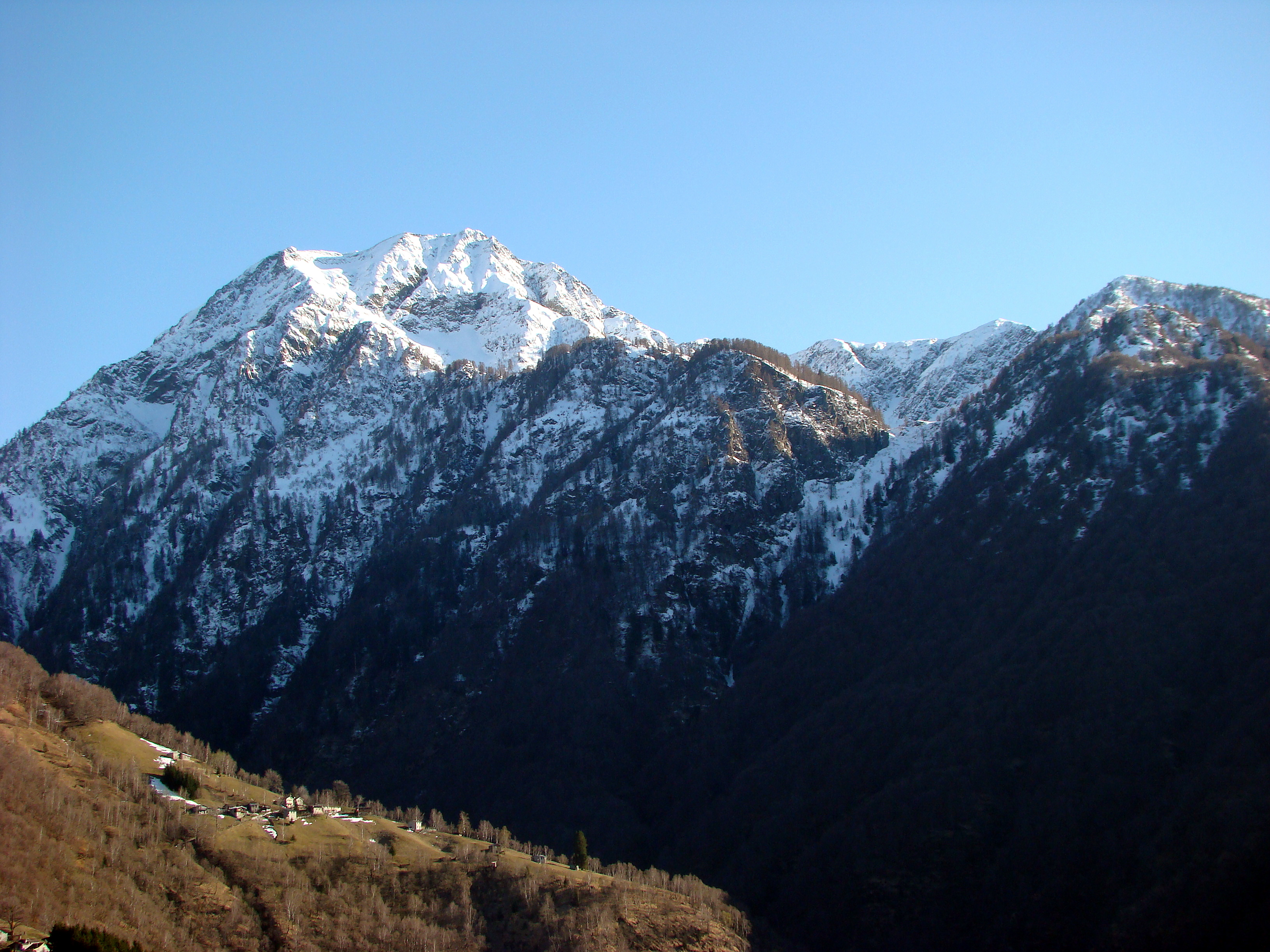
- Camoghè northern slopes from Val Morobbia

Highest point
- Elevation: 2,228 m (7,310 ft)
- Prominence: 283 m (928 ft)
- Parent peak: Pizzo di Gino
- Coordinates: 46°8′5.8″N 9°3′51.3″E

Geography
- Location within Switzerland
- Location: Ticino, Switzerland
- Parent range: Lugano Prealps

The Camoghè is a mountain of the Lugano Prealps, located east of Camorino in the canton of Ticino. It is the highest mountain that can be seen from Lugano city center.

== SOIUSA classification ==
According to the SOIUSA (International Standardized Mountain Subdivision of the Alps) the mountain can be classified in the following way:

- main part = Western Alps
- major sector = North Western Alps
- section = Lugano Prealps
- subsection = Prealpi Comasche
- supergroup = Catena Gino-Camoghè-Fiorina
- group = Gruppo Camoghè-Bar
- subgroup = Sottogruppo del Camoghè
- code = I/B-11.I-A.2.a
