= Lanzo d'Intelvi =

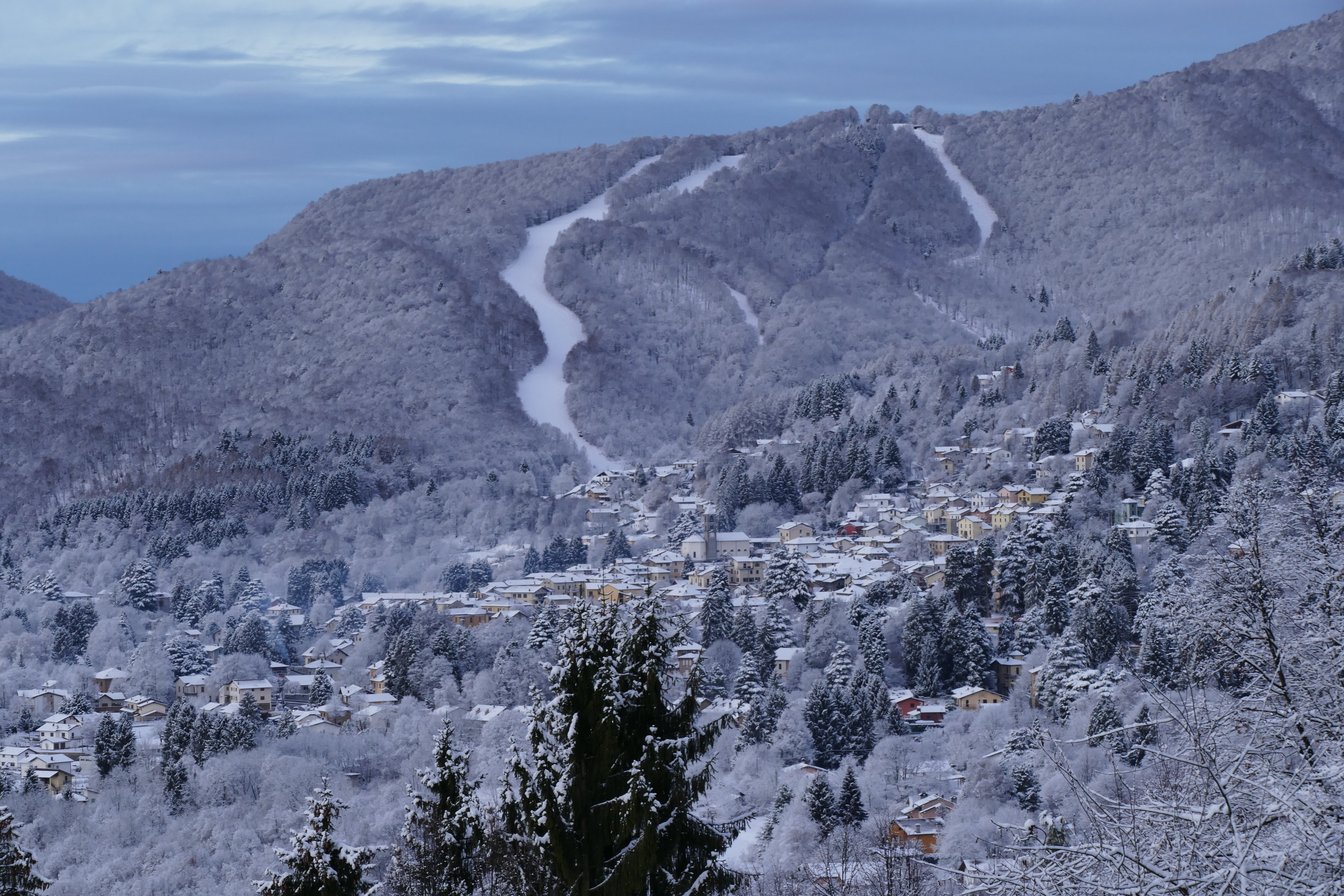
Lanzo d'Intelvi in winter

Lanzo d'Intelvi (Italian pronunciation: [ˈlantso dinˈtɛlvi]) is a village in Italy and a former comune (municipality) in the Province of Como in the Italian region Lombardy, located about 60 kilometres (37 mi) north of Milan and about 20 kilometres (12 mi) north of Como, on the border with Switzerland. It has been frazione of Alta Valle Intelvi since 2017.

This place near the Swiss border was chosen by rich Milan people of the early 20th century to build their own summer mansions. In Lanzo d'Intelvi there are a lot of old luxury liberty villas still original in their aspects.

There was a train to go to the lake of Lugano and then to Lugano with the boat. This mountain train is going to be replaced with a new one, building again another strong touristic environment.
