= Pizzo di Gino =

Mountain in Italy

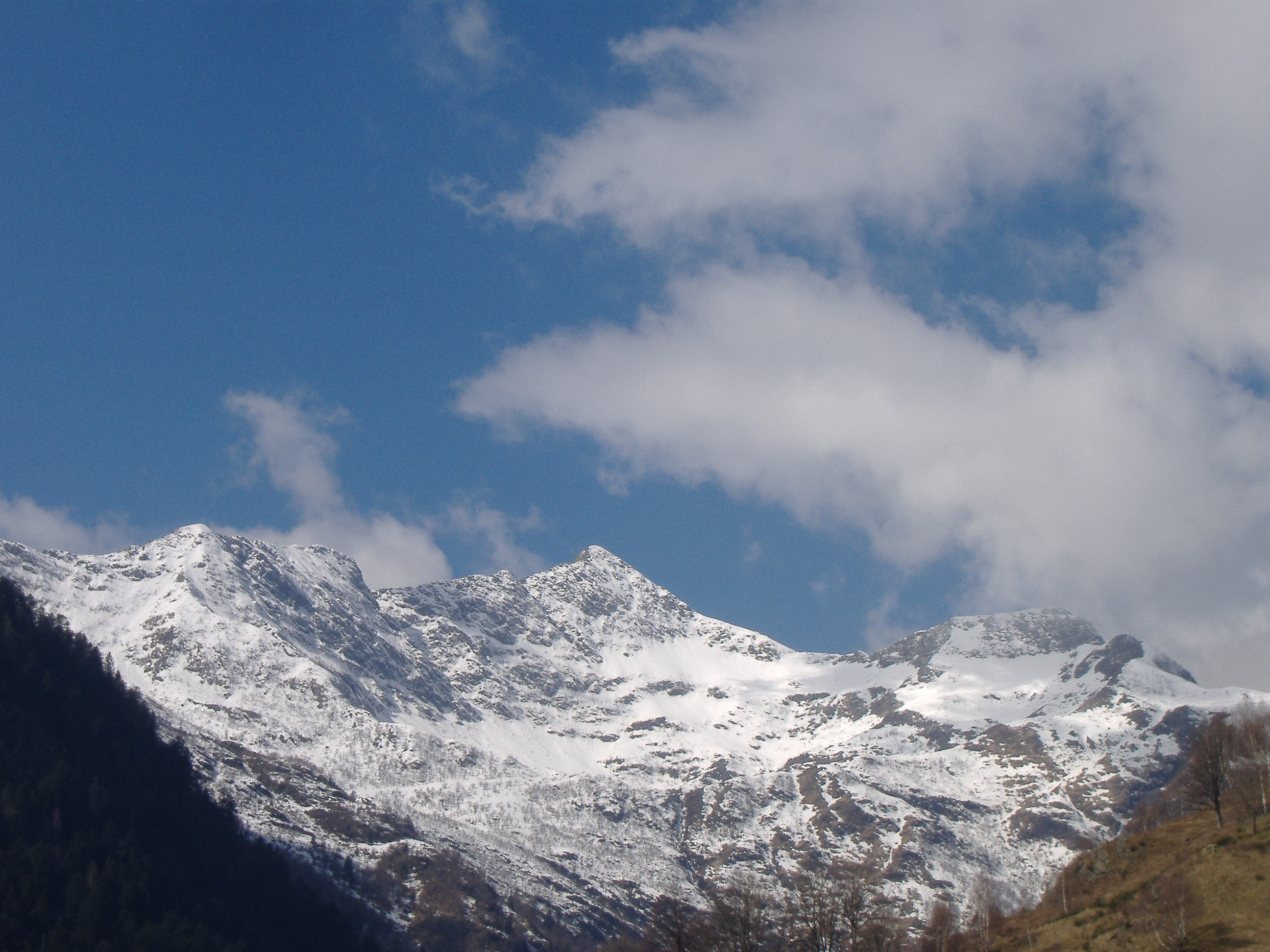

Highest point
- Elevation: 2,245 m (7,365 ft)
- Prominence: 367 m (1,204 ft)
- Coordinates: 46°07′24″N 9°08′43″E

Geography
- Location within Alps
- Location: Lombardy, Italy
- Parent range: Lugano Prealps

Pizzo di Gino is a mountain of Lombardy, Italy. With an elevation of 2,245 m it is the highest peak of the Lugano Prealps.

== SOIUSA classification ==
According to the SOIUSA (International Standardized Mountain Subdivision of the Alps) the mountain can be classified in the following way:

- main part = Western Alps
- major sector = North Western Alps
- section = Lugano Prealps
- subsection = Prealpi Comasche
- supergroup = Catena Gino-Camoghè-Fiorina
- group = Gruppo del Gino
- code = I/B-11.I-A.1

== Access to the summit ==
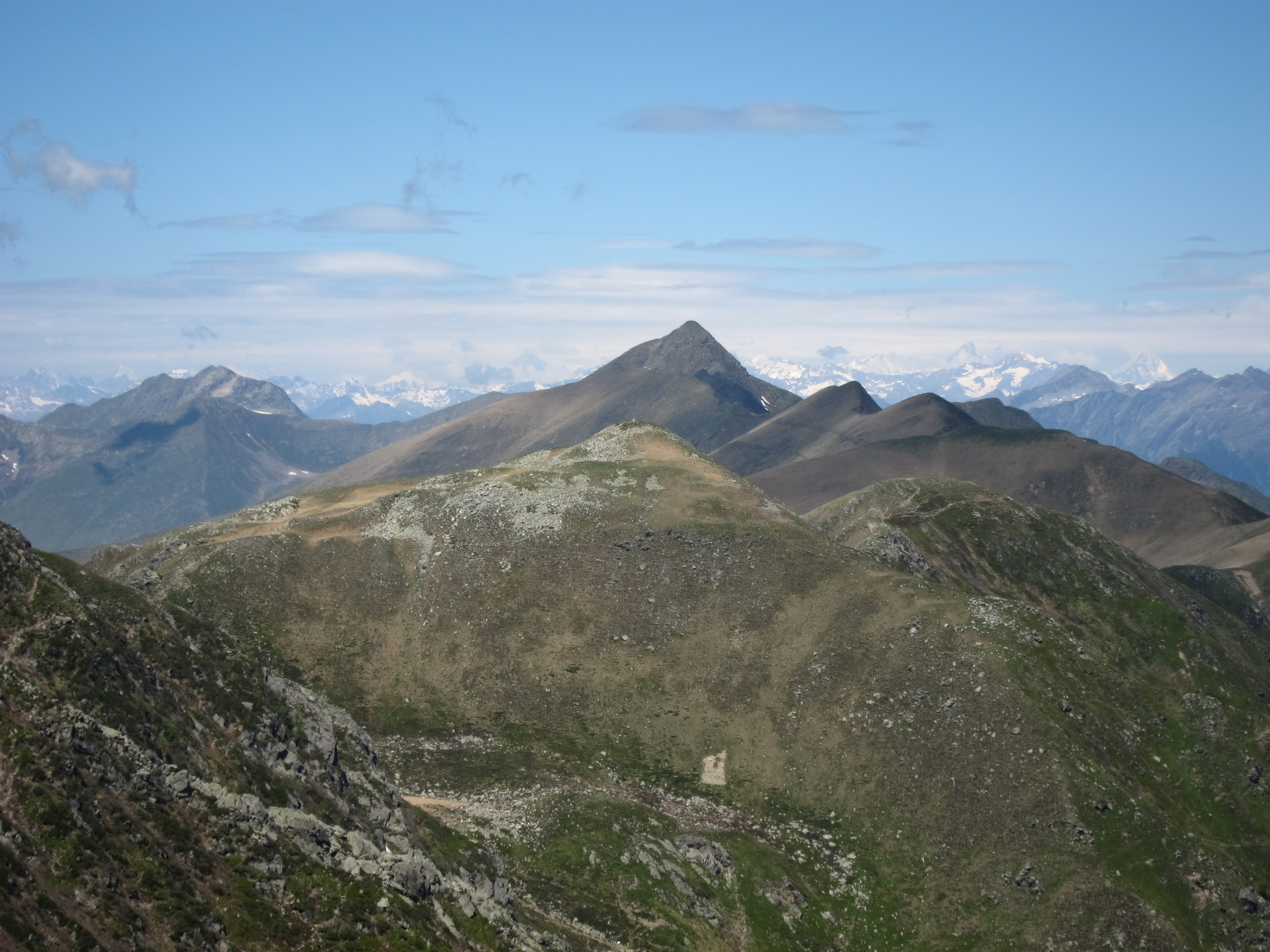
Pizzo di Gino seen from mountain Monte Bregagno

The easiest route for the summit starts from San Nazzaro Val Cavargna and passes by a mountain hut called Rifugio Croce di Campo (1,739 m).
