= Sasso Gordona =

Mountain in Italy

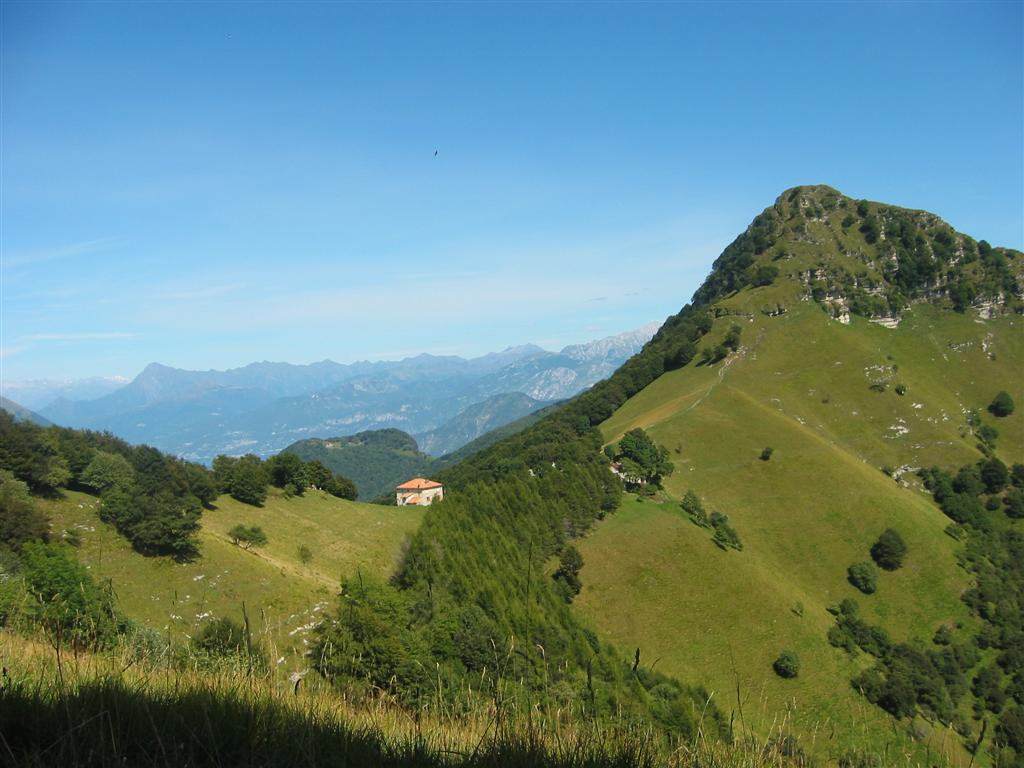
- Sasso Gordona with Rifugio Prabello (left)

Highest point
- Elevation: 1,410 m (4,630 ft)
- Prominence: 450 m (1,480 ft)
- Parent peak: Monte Generoso
- Coordinates: 45°54′42″N 09°04′50″E

Geography
- Location within Alps
- Location: Lombardy, Italy (mountain partially in Switzerland)
- Parent range: Lugano Prealps

Sasso Gordona is a mountain of the Lugano Prealps, located west of Lake Como. It lies in the Italian region of Lombardy, just north of the Swiss border with the canton of Ticino. It has an elevation of 1,410 metres above sea level. The Swiss border reaches a height of 1,200 metres, below Rifugio Prabello.

West of Sasso Gordona is the Rifugio Prabello, a mountain hut owned by the Italian Alpine Club.
