= Monte Grona =

Mountain in Italy

Coordinates: 46°03′45″N 9°12′37″E

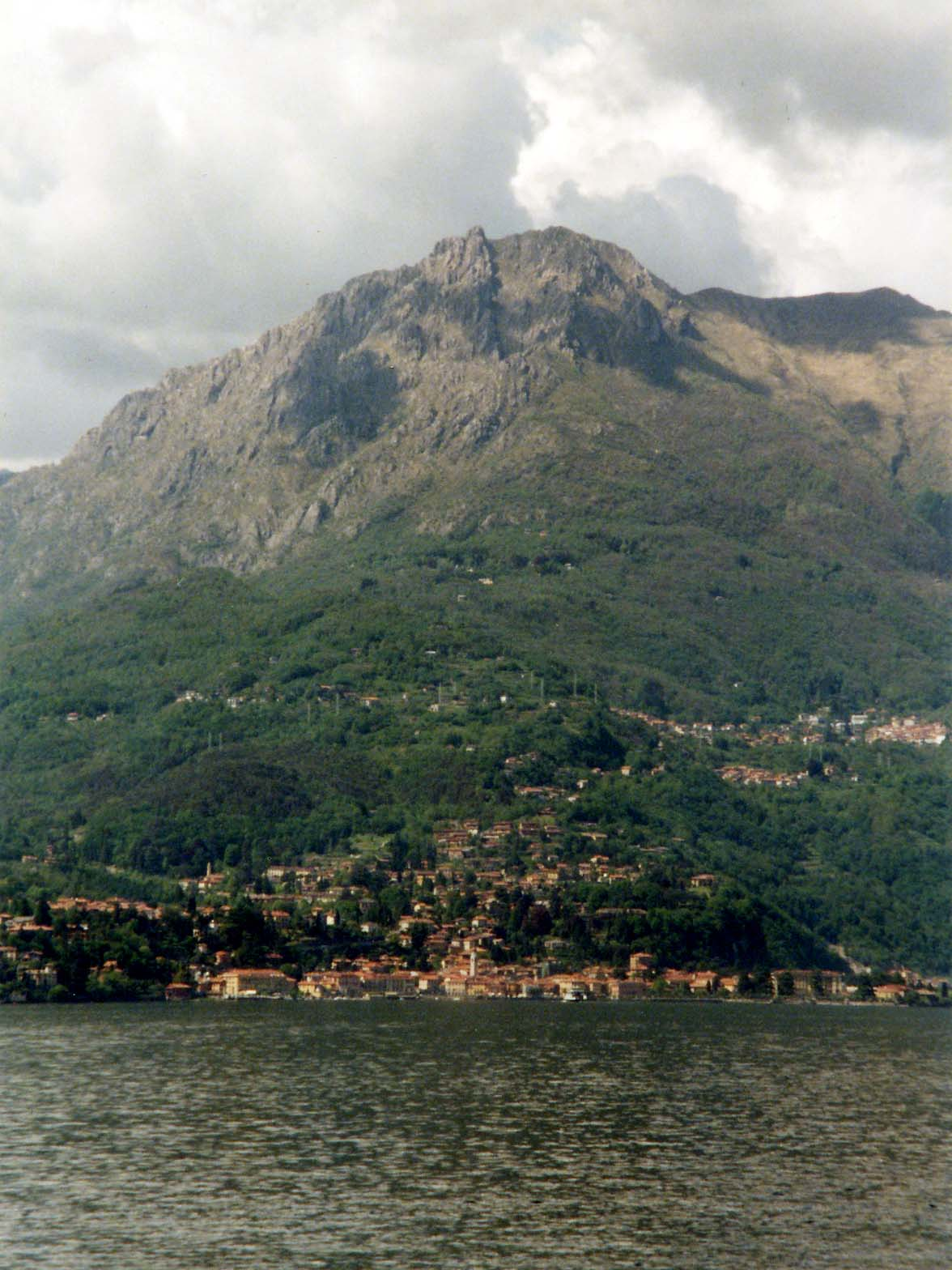

Highest point
- Elevation: 1,736 m (5,696 ft)

Geography
- Location: Lombardy, Italy
- Parent range: Lugano Prealps

Monte Grona is a mountain of Lombardy, Italy. It has an elevation of 1,736 metres and belongs to the province of Como.

== SOIUSA classification ==
According to the SOIUSA (International Standardized Mountain Subdivision of the Alps) the mountain can be classified in the following way:

- main part = Western Alps
- major sector = North Western Alps
- section = Lugano Prealps
- subsection = Prealpi Comasche
- supergroup = Catena Gino-Camoghè-Fiorina
- group = Gruppo del Gino
- code = I/B-11.I-A.1
