= Monte San Primo =

Mountain in Italy

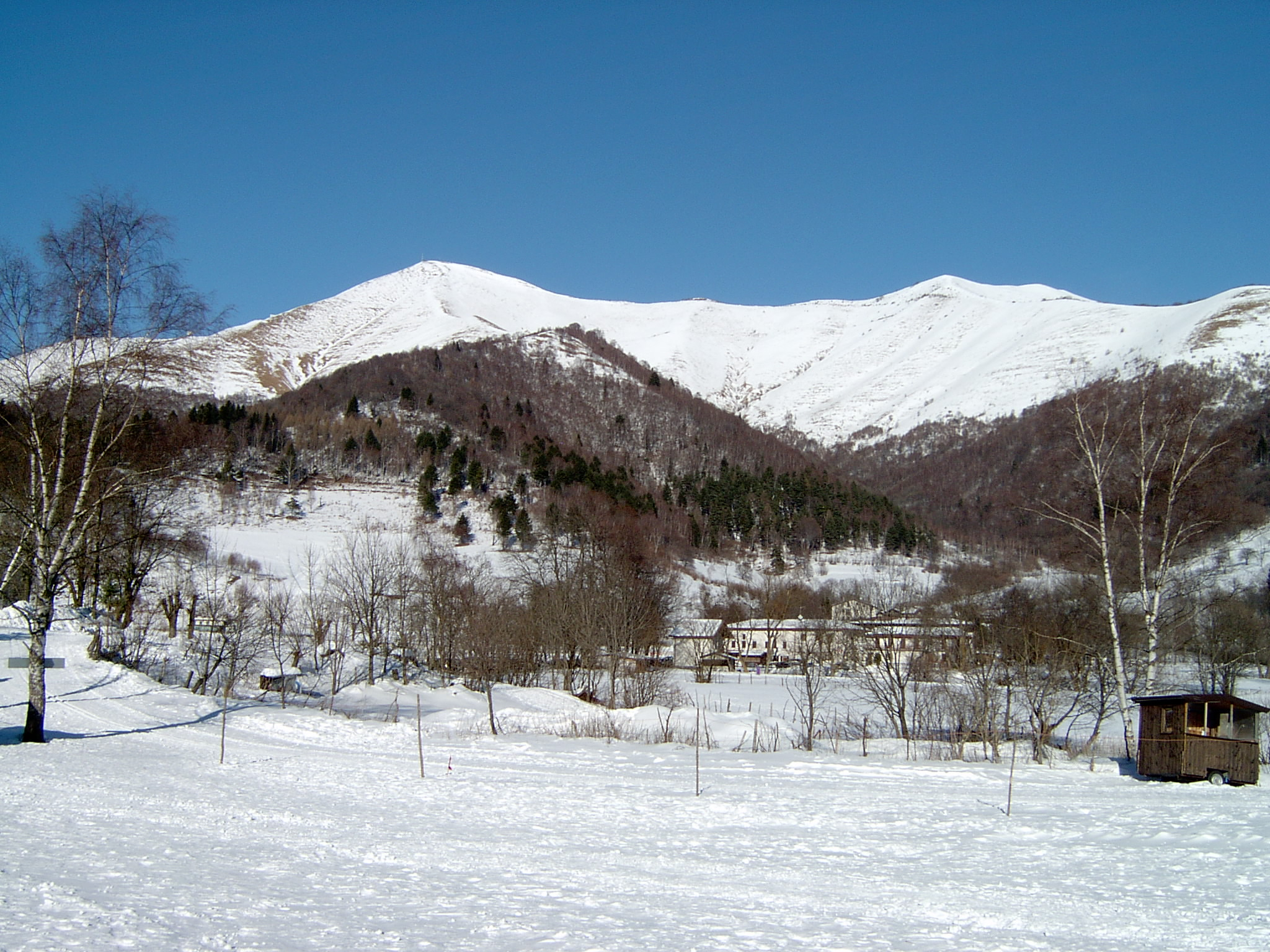
- Monte San Primo in winter

Highest point
- Elevation: 1,682 m (5,518 ft)
- Prominence: 1,407 m (4,616 ft)
- Isolation: 9.76 km (6.06 mi)
- Coordinates: 45°55′00″N 9°12′32″E

Geography
- Location within Alps
- Location: Lombardy, Italy
- Parent range: Lugano Prealps

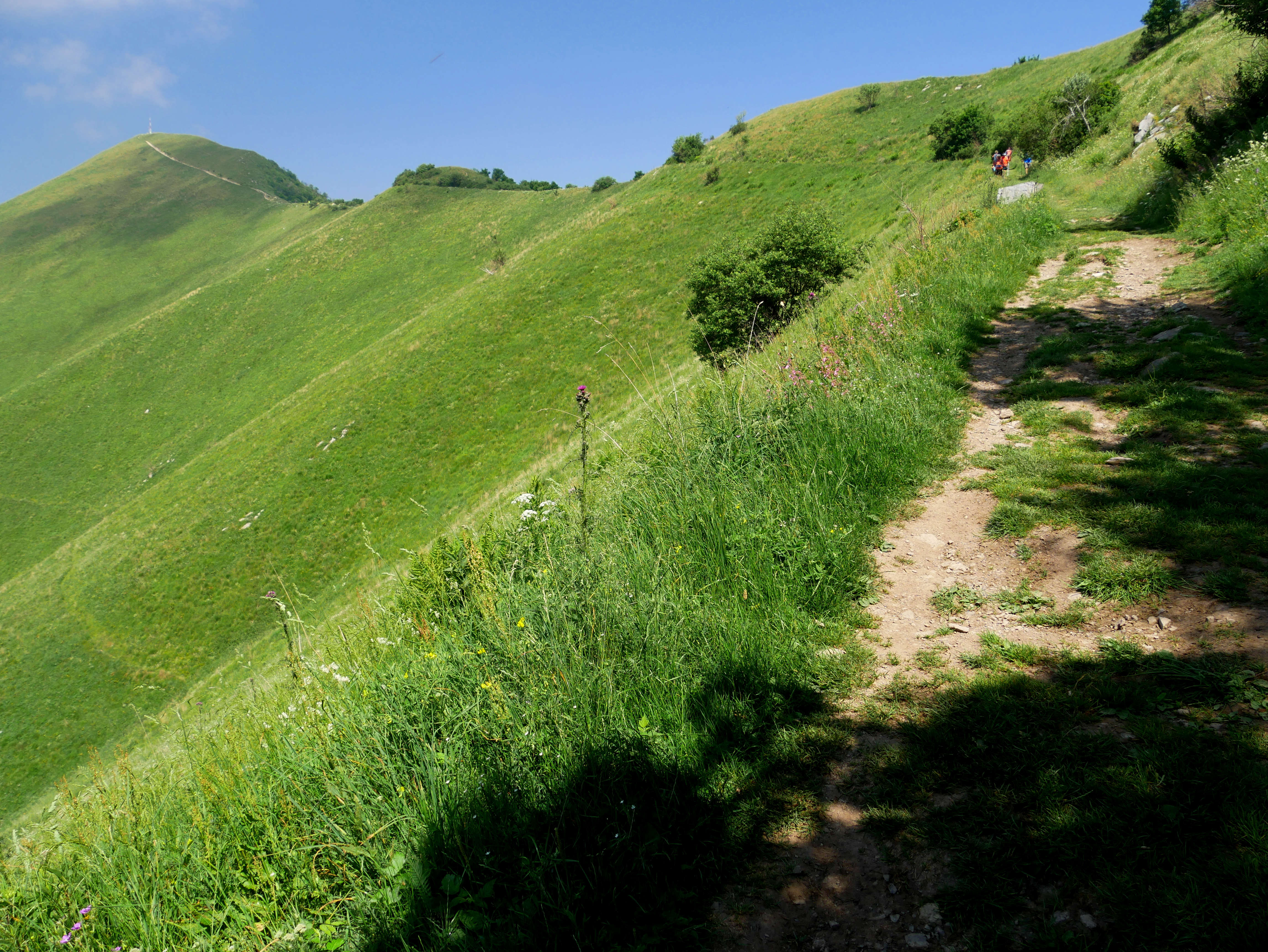
Path to Monte San Primo

Monte San Primo is a mountain of Lombardy, Italy. It is 1,682 metres (5,518 ft) high and belongs to the province of Como. The mountain offers scenic views and is a popular destination for hiking and outdoor activities.

== SOIUSA classification ==
According to the SOIUSA (International Standardized Mountain Subdivision of the Alps) the mountain can be classified in the following way:

- main part = Western Alps
- major sector = North Western Alps
- section = Lugano Prealps
- subsection = Prealpi Comasche
- supergroup = Catena Gino-Camoghè-Fiorina
- group = Gruppo del San Primo
- group = Massiccio del San Primo
- code = I/B-11.I-C.8.a
