= Pizzo della Croce =

Mountain of Lombardy, Italy

Coordinates: 45°56′09″N 9°03′21″E

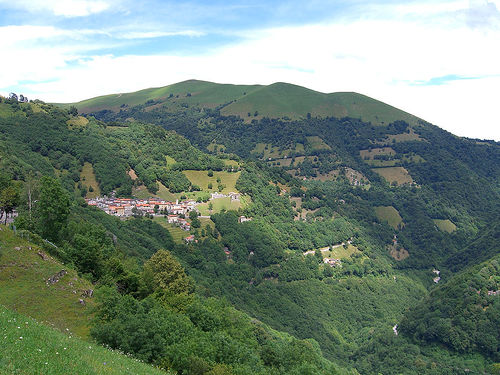

Highest point
- Elevation: 1,491 m (4,892 ft)

Geography
- Location: Lombardy, Italy

Pizzo della Croce is a mountain of Lombardy, Italy. It has an elevation of 1,491 metres.
