= Monte Ceresino =

Mountain in Italy

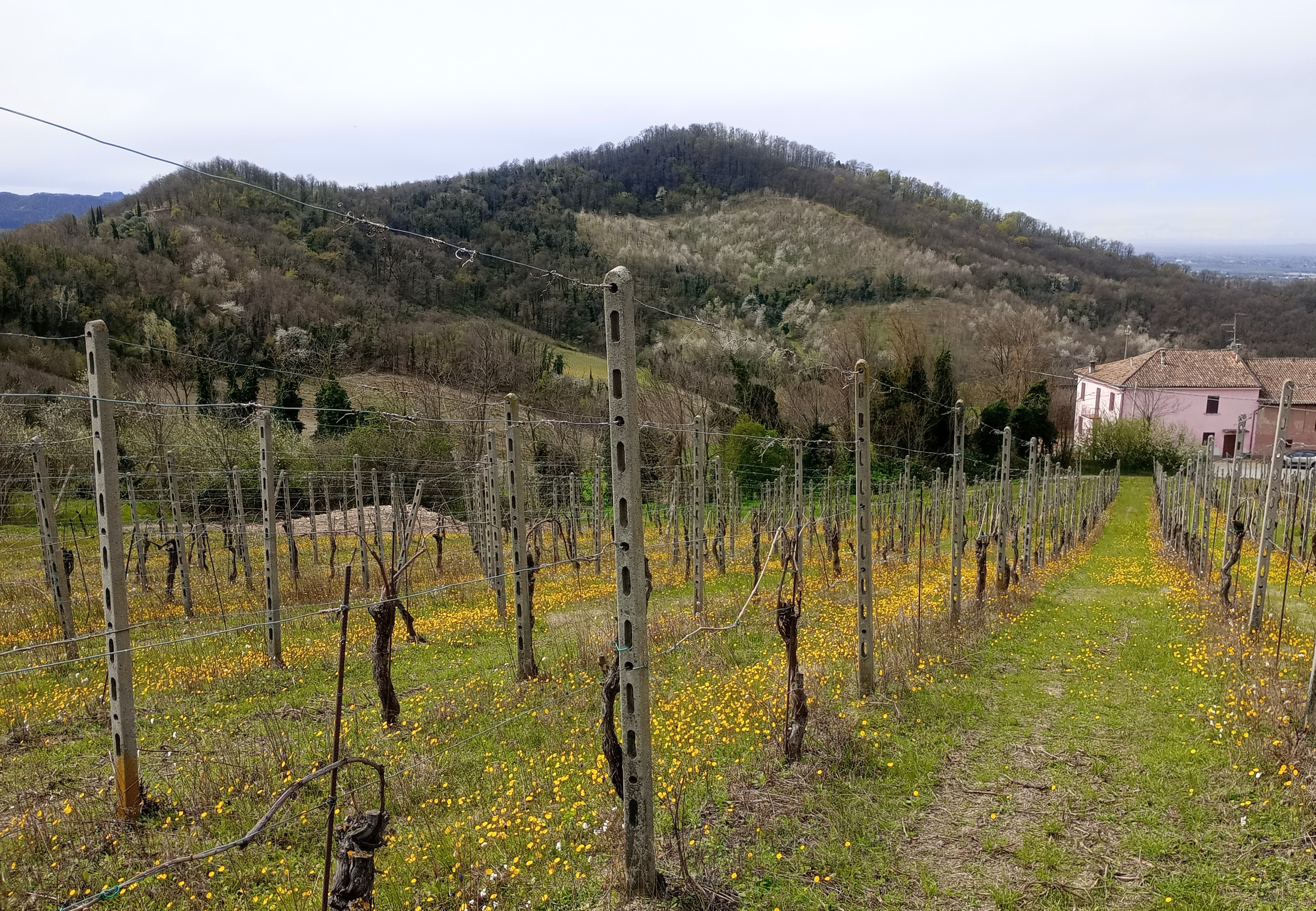
- The hill as seen from Verminetto

Highest point
- Elevation: 433 m (1,421 ft)
- Prominence: 133 m (436 ft)
- Coordinates: 44°58′55″N 9°09′07″E

Geography
- Location within Italy
- Location: Lombardy, Italy

Monte Ceresino is a mountain of Lombardy, Italy, located in the Province of Pavia. It has an elevation of 433 metres.

It is located at the top of two different valleys: that of the Rile (a hamlet in Lombardy), which descends to Casteggio, and that of San Zeno, which descends to Fumo. Part of the mountains slopes in the central-eastern part of Oltrepò Pavese are cultivated with Vineyards.
