= Monte di Tremezzo =

Mountain in Italy

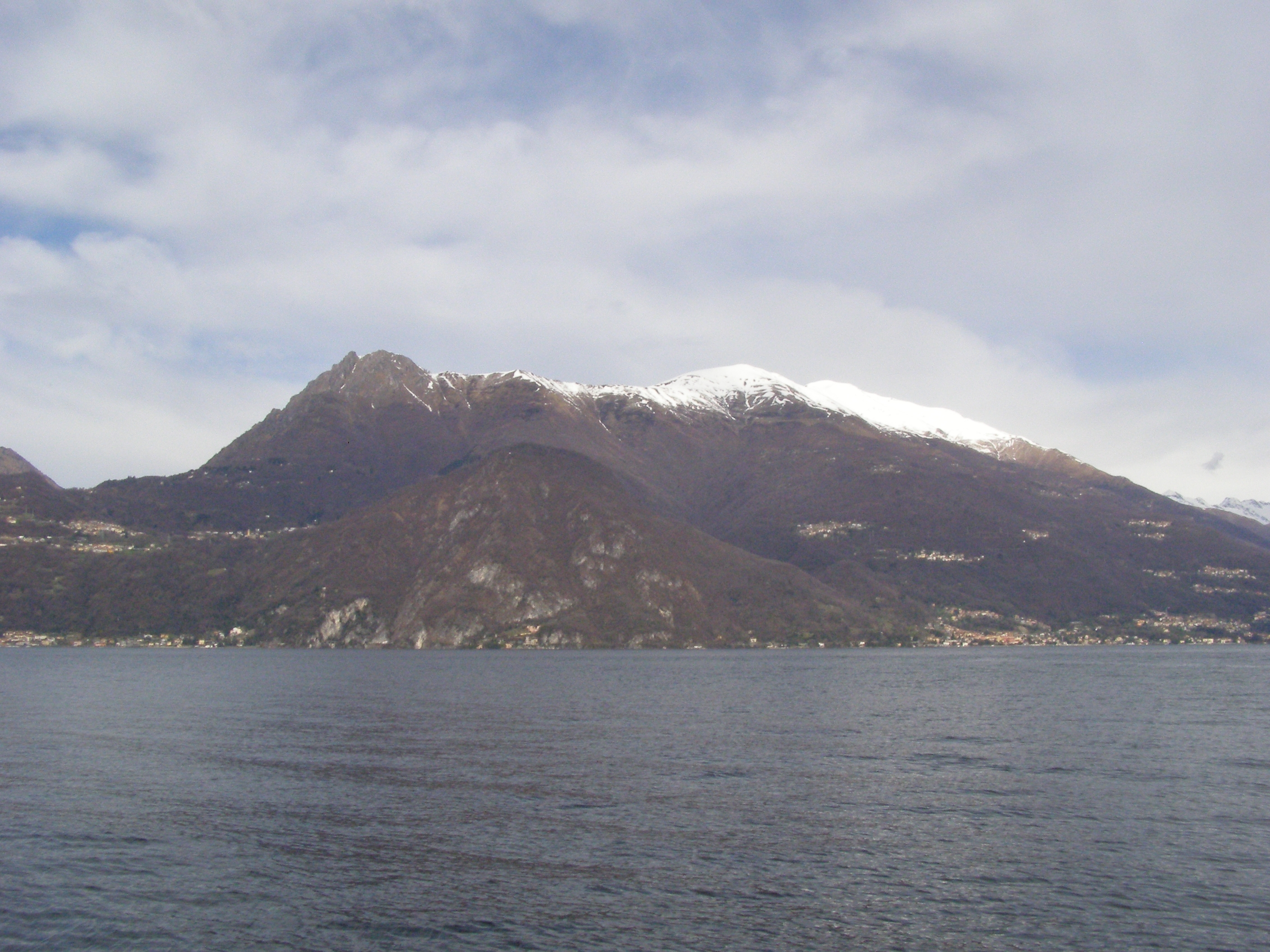
- Monte di Tremezzo from Lake Como

Highest point
- Elevation: 1,700 m (5,600 ft)
- Prominence: 962 m (3,156 ft)
- Coordinates: 46°00′07″N 9°11′07″E

Geography
- Location within Alps
- Location: Lombardy, Italy
- Parent range: Lugano Prealps

Monte di Tremezzo is a mountain of the Lugano Prealps in Lombardy, Italy. It is the highest summit of a ridge just south of Porlezza commune, lying between Lake Lugano and Lake Como. Due to its modest height (by alpine standards) it is a relatively easy mountain to climb, but due to its great prominence it provides a good view across the lakes, and over to the High Alps; mountains as far away as Finsteraarhorn, Dom and Monte Leone can be seen on a clear day.
