= Cimone della Bagozza =

Mountain in Italy

Coordinates: 46°00′40″N 10°15′02″E

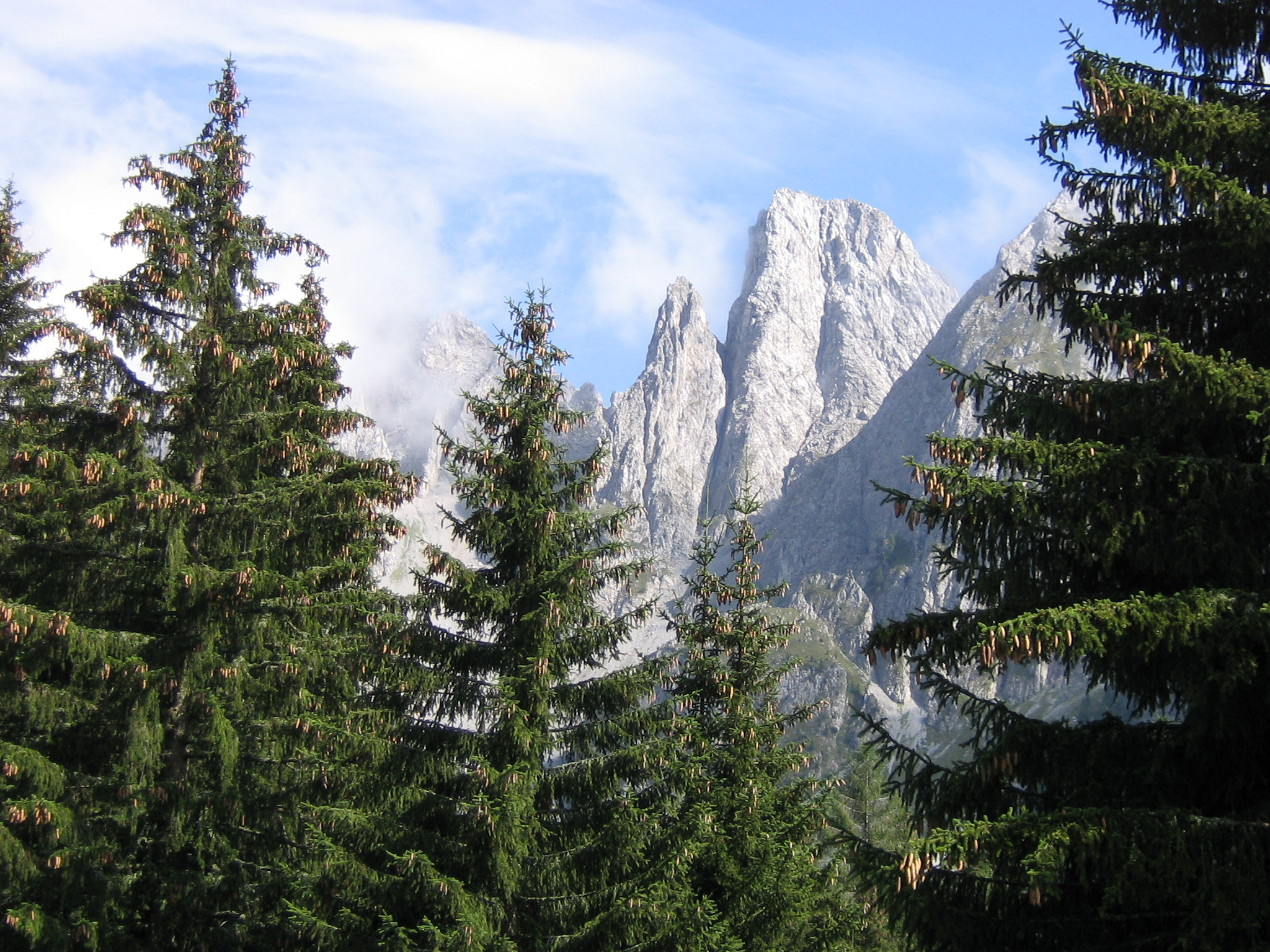

Highest point
- Elevation: 2,407 m (7,897 ft)

Geography
- Location: Lombardy, Italy
- Parent range: Bergamo Alps

Cimone della Bagozza is a mountain of Lombardy, Italy. It is located within the Bergamo Alps.
