= Sighignola =

Mountain in Italy

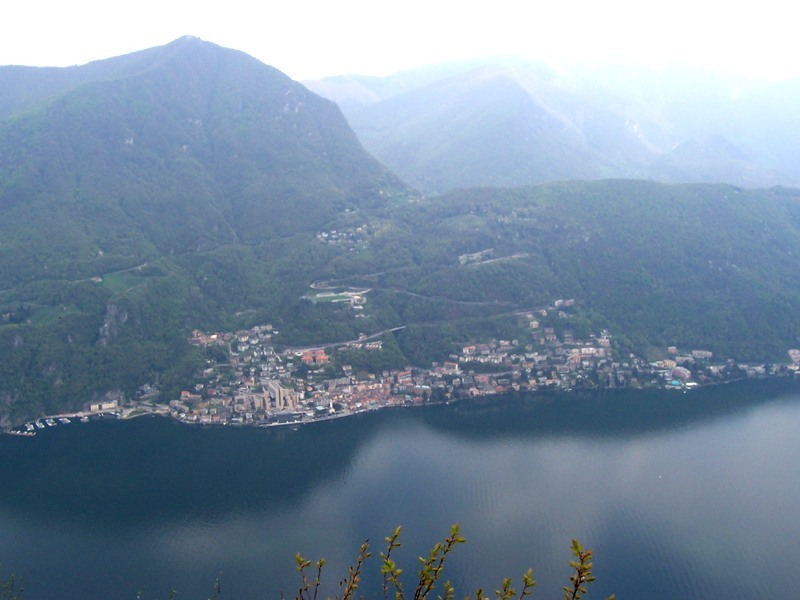
- Sighignola rises above Campione d'Italia, as seen from Monte San Salvatore to the west of Lake Lugano

Highest point
- Elevation: 1,314 m (4,311 ft)
- Prominence: 464 m (1,522 ft)
- Parent peak: Monte Generoso
- Coordinates: 45°58′06″N 8°59′36″E

Geography
- Location within Alps
- Location: Lombardy, Italy (near the Swiss border)
- Parent range: Lugano Prealps

Climbing
- Easiest route: Hike or drive via Lanzo d’Intelvi

Sighignola is a mountain of the Lugano Prealps, located on the border between the Italian region of Lombardy and the Swiss canton of Ticino. A panoramic terrace just below the summit, and directly on the Italian side of the border, provides extensive views especially to the west, over Lake Lugano and the city of Lugano, to the Alps. For this reason, the site is often known as the Balcone d'Italia.

The eastern, Italian, slopes are relatively gentle, and the viewing terrace can be reached by road from Lanzo d’Intelvi, a frazione of the Italian comune of Alta Valle Intelvi, to the east. The slopes to the west down to Lake Lugano are much steeper, and the upper slopes are within the Swiss municipality of Arogno. However, the lakeside below the mountain is occupied by the Italian exclave of Campione d'Italia.

In 1969 it was planned to construct a cable car from Sighignola, across the Swiss upper slopes, to Campione d'Italia. Whilst construction was started, the cable car never opened, and in 2009 an agreement was reached between the Italian and Swiss authorities to remove the remains of the cable car structure.

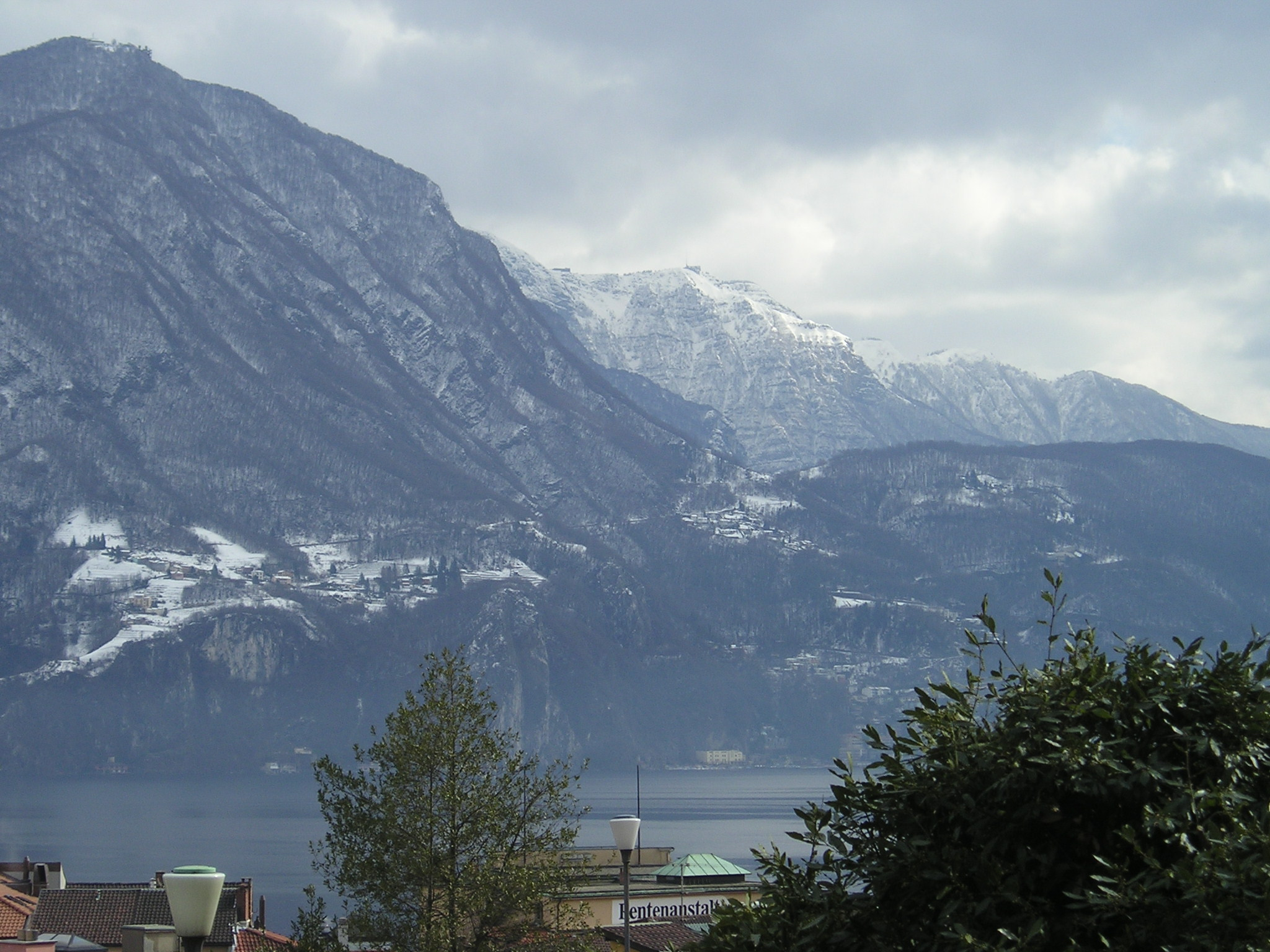
Sighignola (top left) in winter, seen from the city of Lugano

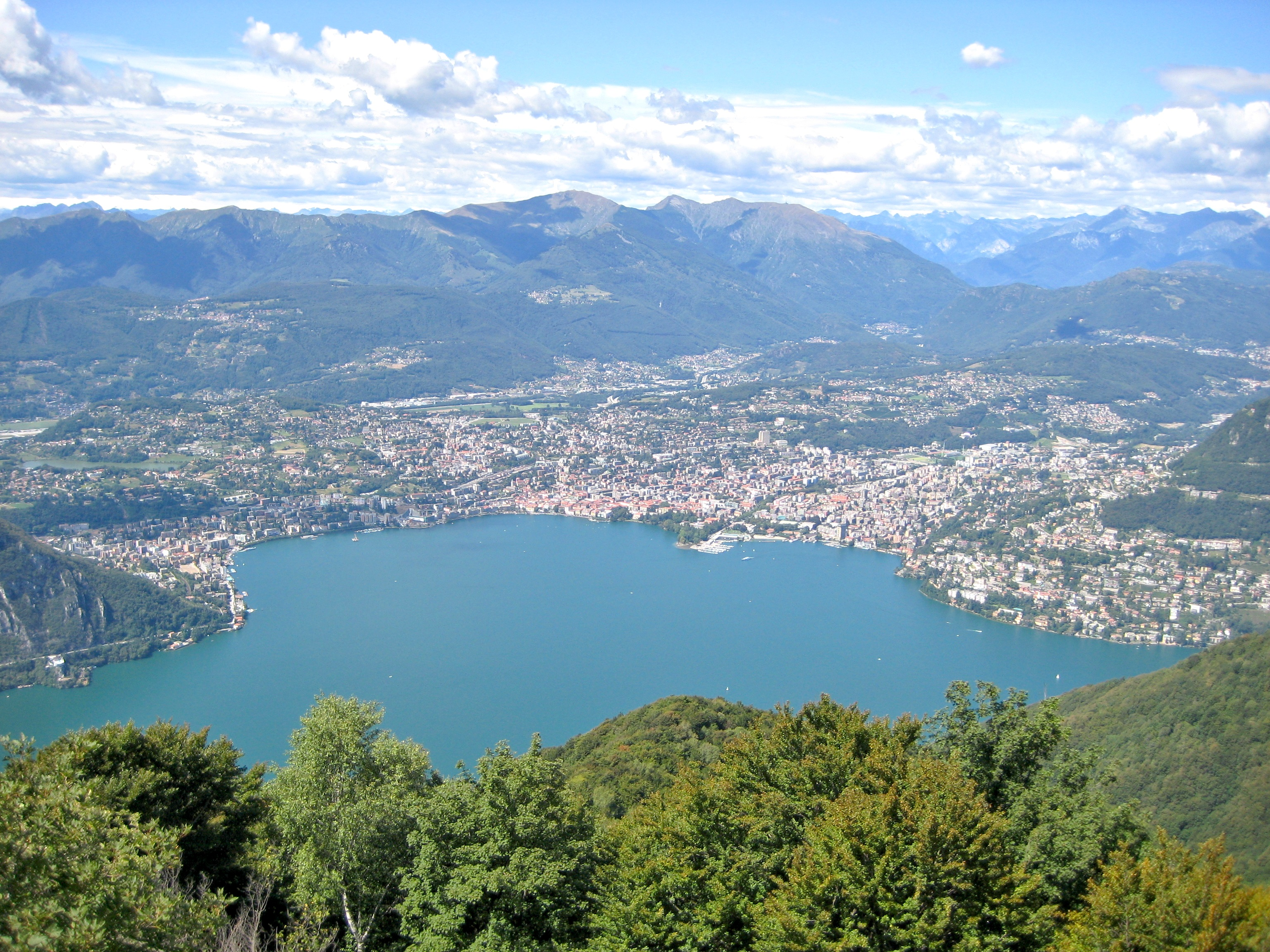
Lugano and the Alps, seen from Sighignola's Balcone d'Italia
