= Monte Budellone =

Mountain in Italy

- Location within Italy

Highest point
- Elevation: 258 m (846 ft)
- Coordinates: 45°34′N 10°25′E

Geography
- Location: Lombardy, Italy

Monte Budellone is a mountain of Lombardy, Italy, It has an elevation of 258 metres. It features a national monument, the "Buco del Frate," an important cave system which features fossils, bats and numerous invertebrate specimens.
