= Monte Bregagno =

Mountain in Italy

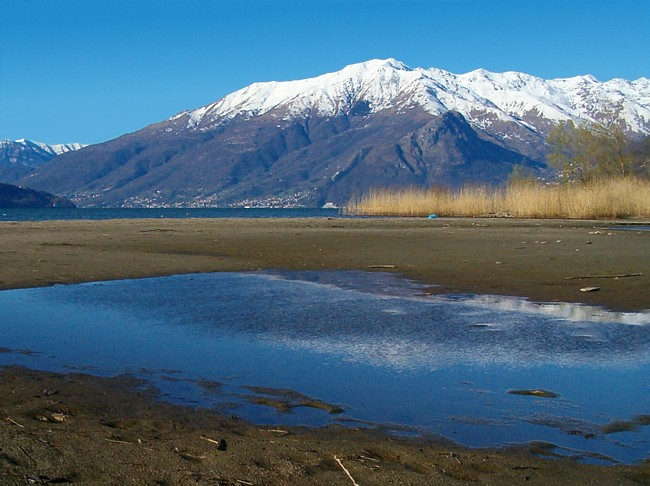

Highest point
- Elevation: 2,107 m (6,913 ft)
- Prominence: 147 m (482 ft)
- Coordinates: 46°05′50″N 9°13′16″E

Geography
- Location within Italy
- Location: Lombardy, Italy
- Parent range: Lugano Prealps

Monte Bregagno is a mountain of Lombardy, Italy, It has an elevation of 2,107 metres.

== SOIUSA classification ==
According to the SOIUSA (International Standardized Mountain Subdivision of the Alps) the mountain can be classified in the following way:

- main part = Western Alps
- major sector = North Western Alps
- section = Lugano Prealps
- subsection = Prealpi Comasche
- supergroup = Catena Gino-Camoghè-Fiorina
- group = Gruppo del Gino
- code = I/B-11.I-A.1
