= Monte Galbiga =

Mountain in Italy

Coordinates: 46°00′43″N 9°09′39″E

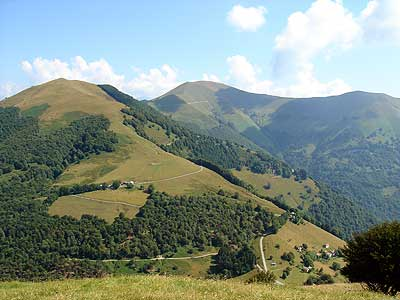

Highest point
- Elevation: 1,698 m (5,571 ft)

Geography
- Location: Lombardy, Italy

Monte Galbiga is a mountain of Lombardy, Italy. It has an elevation of 1698 metres. It has been a hiking destination for over a century.
