= Lugano Prealps =

Mountain range in the Alps

- Prealpi Lombarde Occidentali
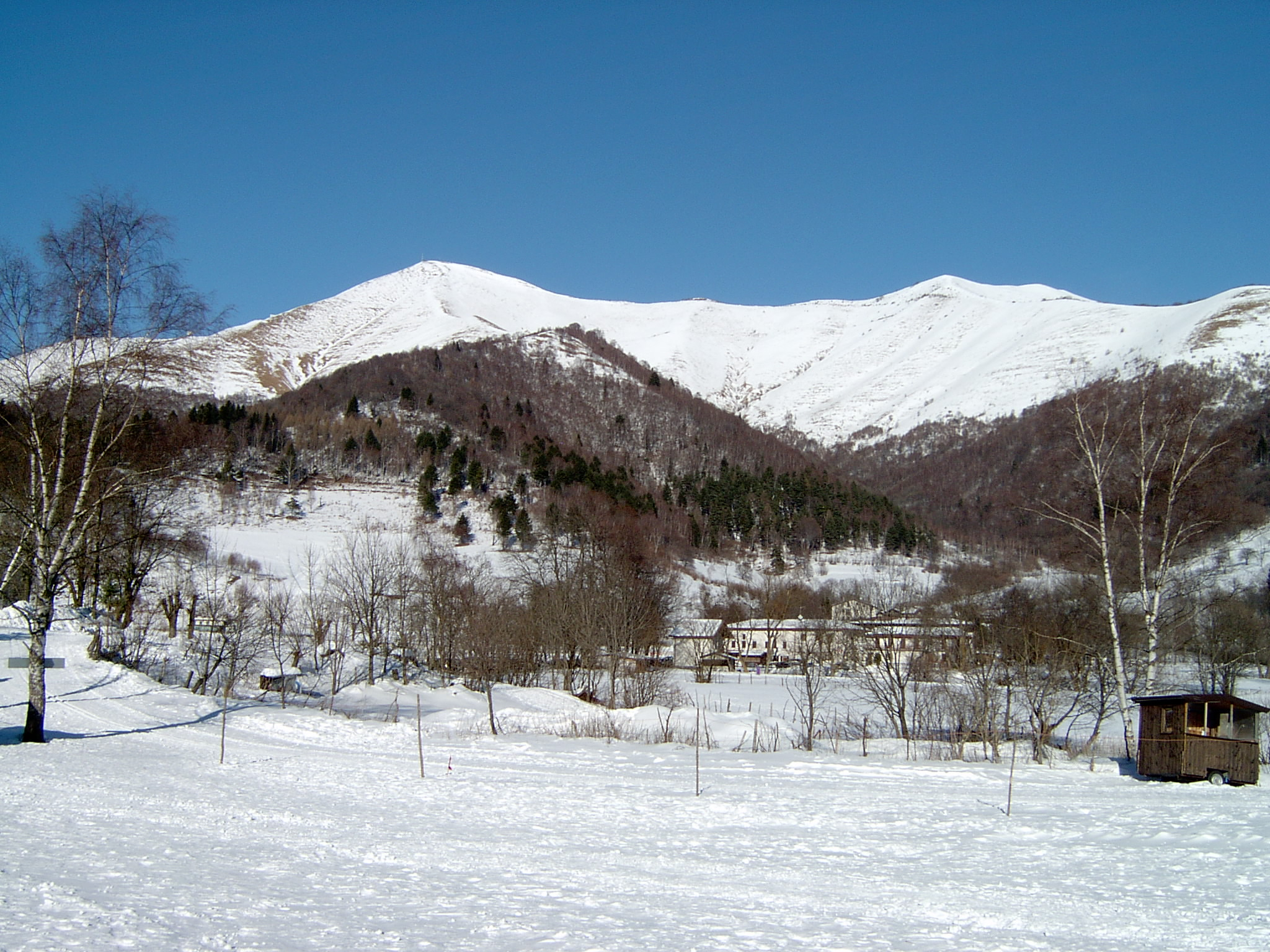
- Monte San Primo in winter from Pian del Tivano

Highest point
- Peak: Pizzo di Gino
- Elevation: 2,245 m (7,365 ft)
- Coordinates: 46°06′03″N 9°12′20″E

Naming
- Native name: Prealpi Luganesi (Italian)

Geography
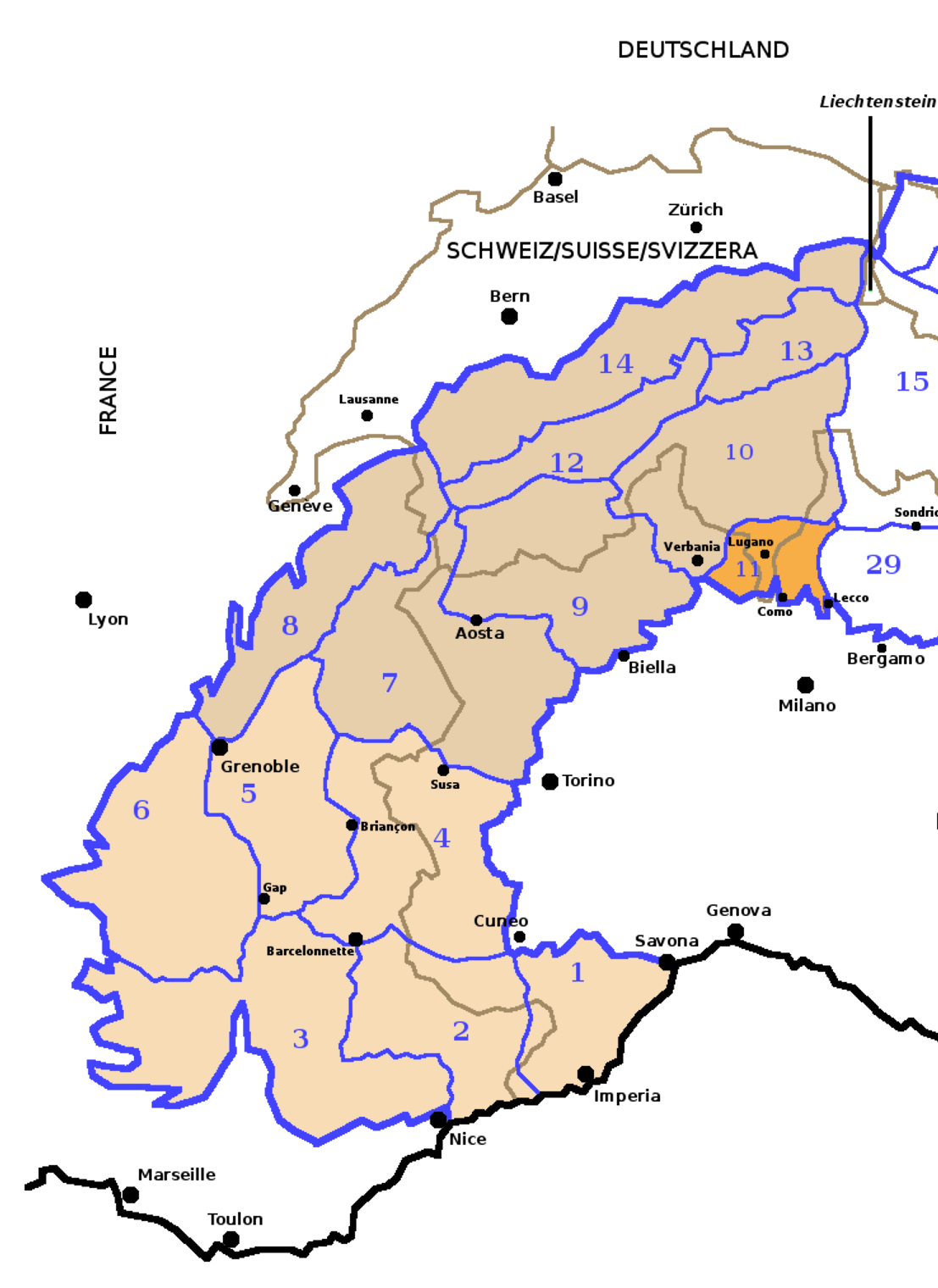
- Lugano Prealps (section no. 11) within the Western Alps
- Countries: Switzerland and Italy
- Canton, Region: Ticino and Lombardy
- Parent range: Alps
- Borders on: Bergamasque Alps and Prealps, Lepontine Alps, Western Rhaetian Alps and Po plain

Geology
- Orogeny: Alpine orogeny
- Rock type: Sedimentary rocks

The Lugano Prealps (Prealpi Luganesi or Prealpi Lombarde Occidentali in Italian) are a mountain range in the western part of the Alps. They are located in Canton Ticino (southern Switzerland) and Lombardy (northern Italy).

== Geography ==
Administratively the Italian part of the range belongs to the provinces of Como and Varese, while the Swiss one is divided between the districts of Bellinzona, Locarno, Lugano and Mendrisio.

The western slopes of the mountains are drained by the Ticino, the eastern ones by Adda and the southern-central part of them by Lambro, Olona and other minor rivers and streams, all of them directly or indirectly tributaries of the Po.

=== SOIUSA classification ===
According to SOIUSA (International Standardized Mountain Subdivision of the Alps) the mountain range is an Alpine section, classified in the following way:

- main part = Western Alps
- major sector = North Western Alps
- section = Lugano Prealps
- code = I/B-11

=== Borders ===
Lugano Prealps' borders are (clockwise):

- Lago Maggiore (west),
- Ticino from Locarno to Bellinzona, San Jorio Pass (2.010 m, which connects them with the Lepontine Alps) and San Jorio valley till to Gravedona (north);
- Como lake (east);
- Po Plain (south).

=== Subdivision ===
The Lugano Prealps are divided into two subsections:

- Como Prealps - SOIUSA code:I/B-11.I
- Varese Prealps - SOIUSA code:I/B-11.II,

which are separated by the Monte Ceneri Pass.

These subsections are further divided in supergroups:

- Como Prealps:
  - supergroup catena Gino-Camoghè-Fiorina - SOIUSA code:I/B-11.I-A
  - supergroup catena Tremezzo-Generoso-Gordona - SOIUSA code:I/B-11.I-B
  - supergroup catena del Triangolo Lariano - SOIUSA code:I/B-11.I-B
- Varese Prealps:
  - supergroup catena Tamaro-Gambarogno-Lema - SOIUSA code:I/B-11.II-A,
  - supergroup catena Piambello-Campo dei Fiori-Nudo - SOIUSA code:I/B-11.II-B.

== Summits ==
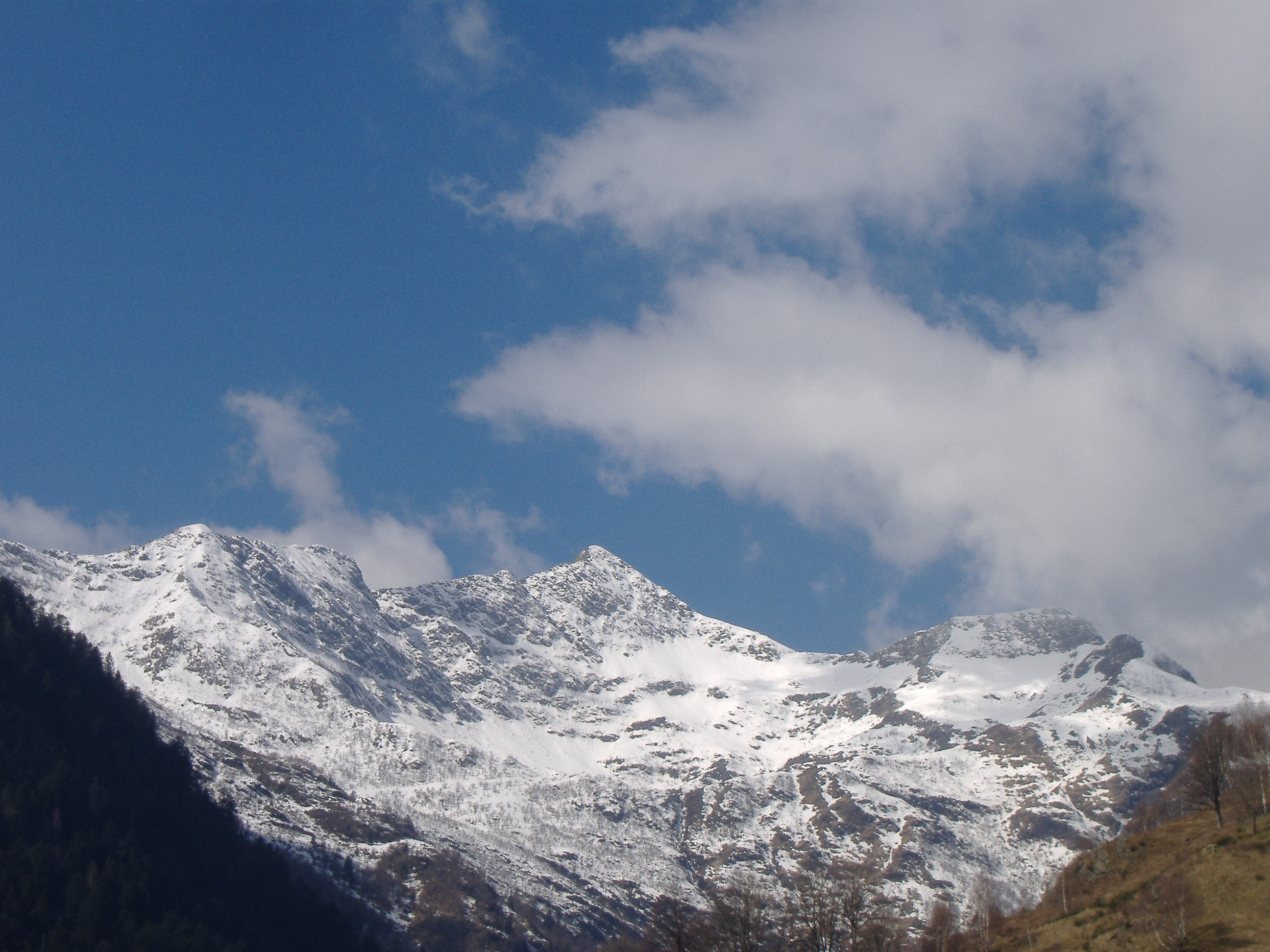
Pizzo di Gino

The chief summits of the range are:

Name	metres	feet
Pizzo di Gino	2,245	7,363
Camoghè	2,226	7,301
Gazzirola	2,116	6,940
Monte Bregagno	2,107	6,910
Monte Tamaro	1,967	6,451
Monte Gradiccioli	1,936	6,352
Monte Grona	1,736	5,694
Monte Generoso	1,704	5,589
Monte di Tremezzo	1,700	5,600
Monte San Primo	1,685	5,526
Monte Lema	1,621	5,316
Corni di Canzo	1,373	4,503
Sighignola	1,314	4,311
Monte Nudo	1,235	4,050
Monte Pian Nave	1,058	3,471
Monte Minisfreddo	1,047	3,435
Poncione di Ganna	993	3,258
Monte Chiusarella	913	2,995
Colle di Brianza	877	2,877
Monte Monarco	858	2,815

== Maps ==
- Italian official cartography (Istituto Geografico Militare - IGM); on-line version: www.pcn.minambiente.it
- Swiss official cartography (Swiss Federal Office of Topography - Swisstopo); on-line version: map.geo.admin.ch
