= Varese Prealps =

Mountain range in the Alps

- Western Lugano Prealps
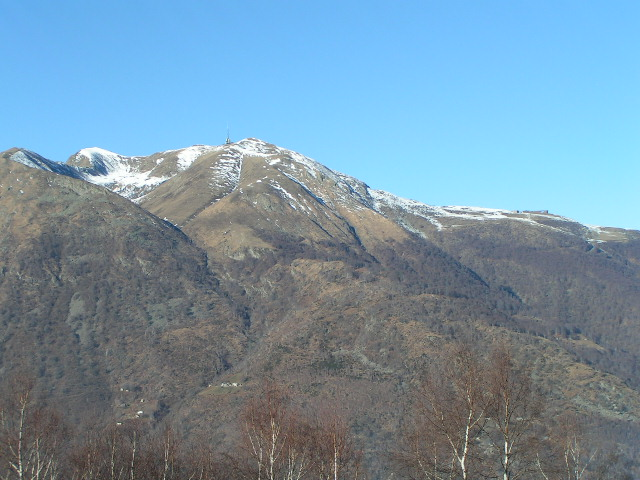
- Monte Tamaro, the highest mountain in the Varese Prealps

Highest point
- Peak: Monte Tamaro
- Elevation: 1,967 m (6,453 ft)

Naming
- Native name: Prealpi Varesine (Italian)

Geography
- Countries: Switzerland and Italy
- Canton, Region: Ticino and Lombardy
- Parent range: Lugano Prealps
- Borders on: Comasche Prealps, Lepontine Alps and Po plain

Geology
- Orogeny: Alpine orogeny
- Rock type: Sedimentary rocks

The Varese Prealps (Italian: Prealpi Varesine) are a subsection of the Lugano Prealps, located between the Italian Province of Varese and Canton Ticino in Switzerland, between Lake Maggiore, Lake Lugano, the Val d'Agno and the Po Plain.

They include two main ranges, separated by the Tresa valley: to the north the Tamaro-Gambarogno-Lema range, and to the south the Piambello-Campo dei Fiori-Nudo range. The Tamaro-Gambarogno-Lema range includes the tallest mountains in the Varese Prealps, Monte Tamaro (1,967 m), Monte Gradiccioli (1,936 m) and Monte Lema (1,621 m).

The Piambello-Campo dei Fiori-Nudo range is further divided in a number of massifs. The Campo dei Fiori massif, whose highest peak is Punta di Mezzo (1,227 m), is located just north of Varese, between Lake Varese to the south, the Val di Rasa to the east and the Valcuvia to the north. The Martica-Chiusarella massif, whose highest peak is Monte Martica (1,032 m), lies to its east, between Varese, the Val di Rasa, the Valcuvia and the Valganna. Further to the east is the Minisfreddo-Poncione massif, which includes Monte Minisfreddo (the highest at 1,042 m), Monte San Bernardo, Poncione di Ganna and Monte Rho di Arcisate.

The Piambello massif is located east of the Valganna, southwest of Lake Lugano and northwest of Valceresio. Its peaks include Monte Piambello (the highest at 1,129 m), Monte Sette Termini, Monte La Nave, Monte Mezzano and Monte Castelvecchio. South-east of it is the San Giorgio-Pravello massif, consisting of Monte San Giorgio (1,097 m), Monte Pravello (1,015 m), Monte Orsa and Monte Sant'Elia. Finally, the Valcuvia massif is located between Valcuvia, Valtravaglia and Lake Maggiore; it includes Monte Nudo, the highest peak in the southern Varese Prealps at 1,235 meters above sea level, as well as Sasso del Ferro (1,062 m), Poggio Sant'Elsa, Pizzo di Cuvignone (1,018 m), the Pizzoni di Laveno (1,035 m), Monte San Martino (1,087 m) and Monte Pian Nave (1,058 m).

The Campo dei Fiori Regional Park and the Cinque Vette Park are located in the Varese Prealps.

== Main peaks ==
The main mountains, arranged by descending elevation above sea level, are:

- Monte Tamaro - 1,967 m
- Monte Gradiccioli - 1,936 m
- Monte Gambarogno - 1,734 m
- Monte Magno - 1,640 m
- Monte Lema - 1,621 m
- Monte Paglione - 1,554 m
- Monte Nudo - 1,235 m
- Punta di Mezzo (Campo dei Fiori) - 1,227 m
- Monte Colonna - 1,203 m
- Monte Rogoria - 1,184 m
- Monte Piambello - 1,129 m
- Monte Tre Croci - 1,111 m
- Monte San Giorgio - 1,097 m
- Monte San Martino - 1,087 m
- Sasso del Ferro - 1,062 m
- Monte Pian Nave - 1,058 m
- Monte Minisfreddo - 1,042 m
- Pizzoni di Laveno - 1,035 m
- Monte Martica - 1,032 m
- Pizzo di Cuvignone - 1,018 m
- Monte Pravello - 1,015 m
- Monte Orsa - 998 m
- Poncione di Ganna - 993 m
- Monte La Nave - 988 m
- Monte Sette Termini - 972 m
- Poggio Sant'Elsa - 950 m
- Monte Rho di Arcisate - 935 m
- Monte Chiusarella - 913 m
- Monte Monarco - 858 m
- Monte Mondonico - 807 m
- Monte Scerrè - 796 m
- Monte Crocino - 690 m
- Monte Sant'Elia - 678 m
- Monte Castelvecchio - 623 m
- Monte Useria - 555 m
