= Poncione =

Poncione may refer to the following mountains in the Lepontine Alps in Switzerland and in the Varese Prealps in Italy:

- Poncione dei Laghetti
- Poncione dei Laghetti (Lavertezzo)
- Poncione di Braga
- Poncione di Piotta
- Poncione di Valleggia
- Poncione di Vespero
- Poncione Piancascia
- Poncione Pro do Rodùc
- Poncione Rosso
- Poncione di Ganna
- Poncione d'Arzo
