= Valganna (valley) =

Valley in Italy

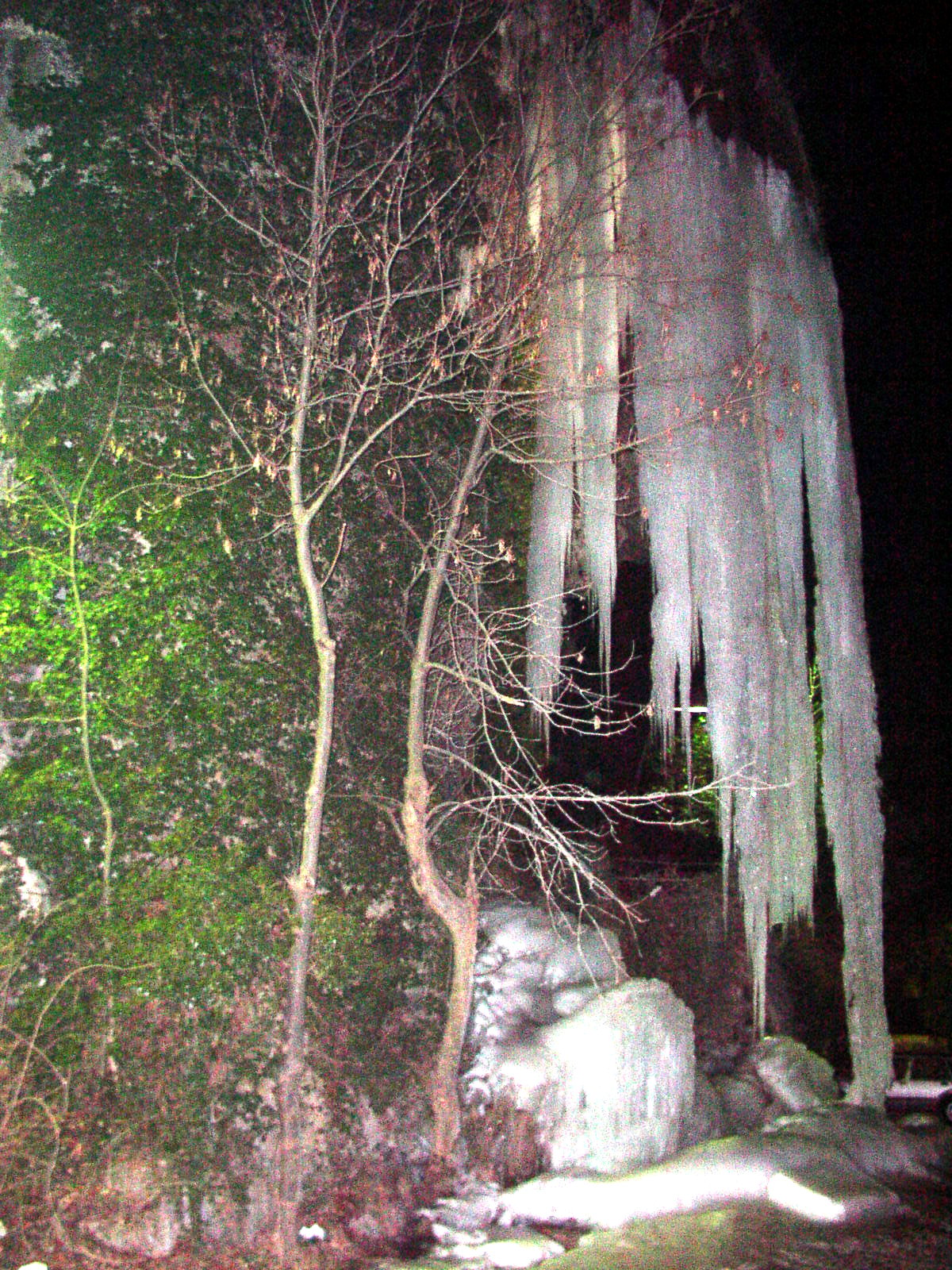
Valganna waterfalls during winter

The Valganna is a valley in the Lugano Prealps, located north of Varese in northwestern Lombardy, Italy. Its main peaks are Monte Piambello, Poncione di Ganna, Monte Monarco, Monte Martica, Monte Chiusarella and Monte Minisfreddo. It is crossed by the Olona and Margorabbia rivers, and two small lakes, Lago di Ganna and Lago di Ghirla, are located in the valley.

Three municipalities are located in the valley; Valganna, Cunardo and Induno Olona.

The Valganna is known for its caves and its waterfalls, often frozen during winter.
