= Monte Scerrè =

Mountain in Italy

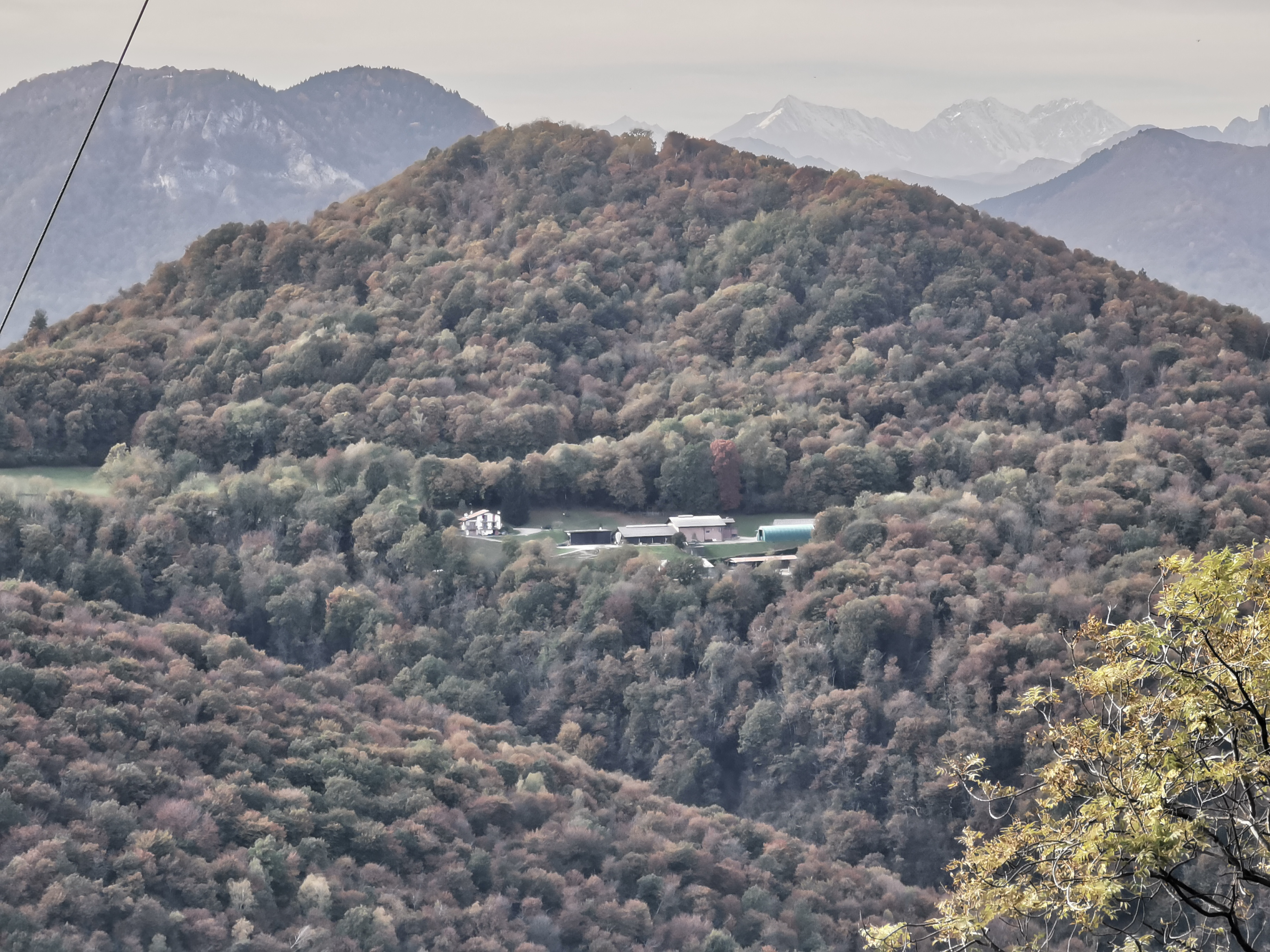
- Monte Scerrè seen from Boarezzo

Highest point
- Elevation: 796 m (2,612 ft)
- Prominence: 106 m (348 ft)
- Coordinates: 45°55′04″N 8°48′21″E

Geography
- Location within Lombardy
- Location: Lombardy, Italy
- Parent range: Varese Prealps

Monte Scerrè, also known as Scerè, is a mountain of Lombardy, Italy, with an elevation of 796 metres (2,612 ft). It is located in the Varese Prealps, in the Province of Varese.

It lies in the territory of the municipalities of Cunardo, Valganna and Bedero Valcuvia, with the hamlet of Mondonico situated about one hundred meters below the peak. Along with nearby Monte Mondonico, it divides the Valcuvia from the Valganna.

The source of the Bevera, a small stream that flows into the Olona after eight kilometres, is located on Monte Scerrè.

A chapel to the Madonna degli Alpini (Our Lady of the Alpini) and trenches and machine-gun posts of the Cadorna Line are located on the mountain.
