= Monte Orsa =

Mountain in Italy

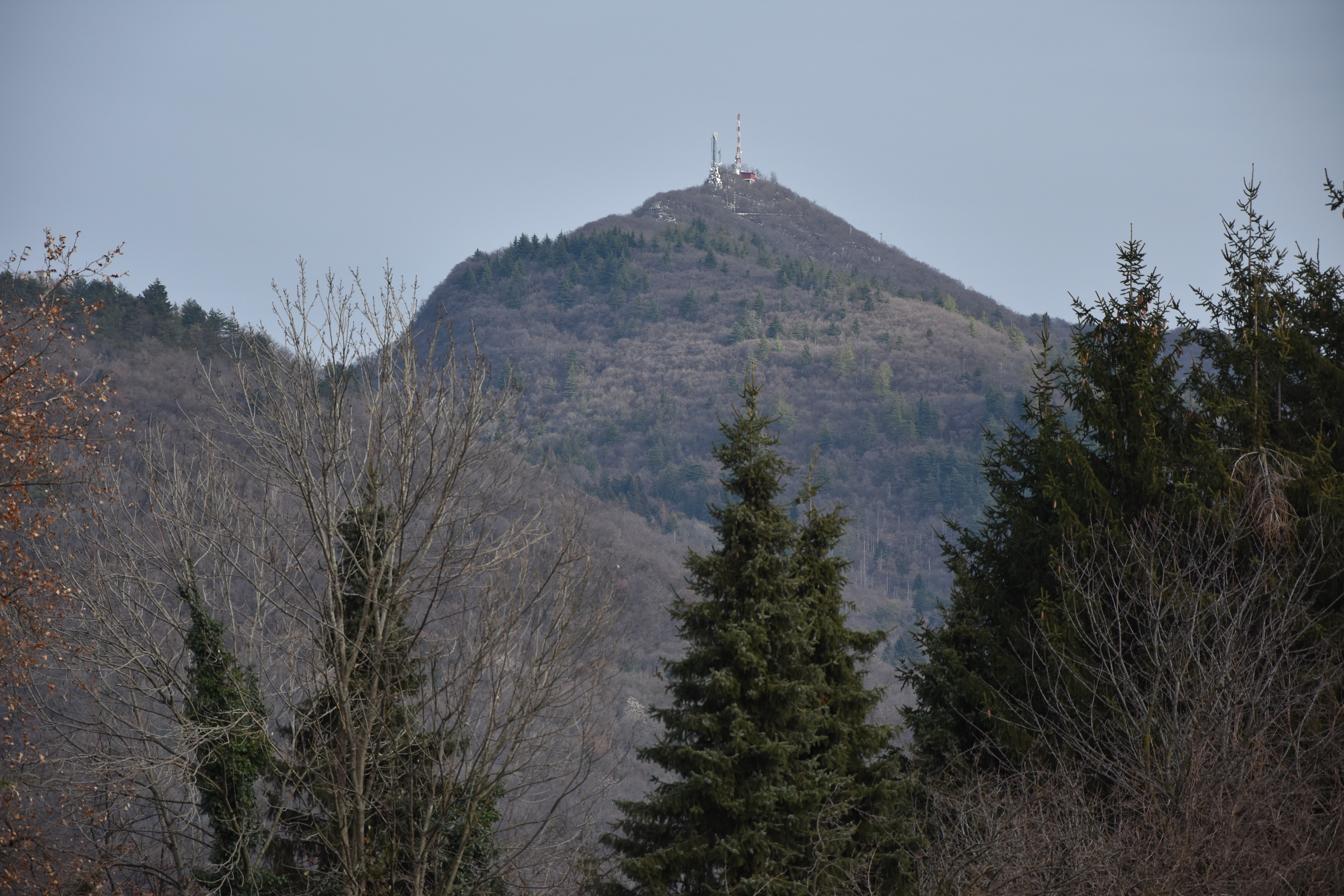
- Monte Orsa seen from Brenno Useria

Highest point
- Elevation: 998 m (3,274 ft)
- Coordinates: 45°53′17″N 8°54′54″E

Geography
- Location within Lombardy
- Location: Lombardy, Italy
- Parent range: Varese Prealps

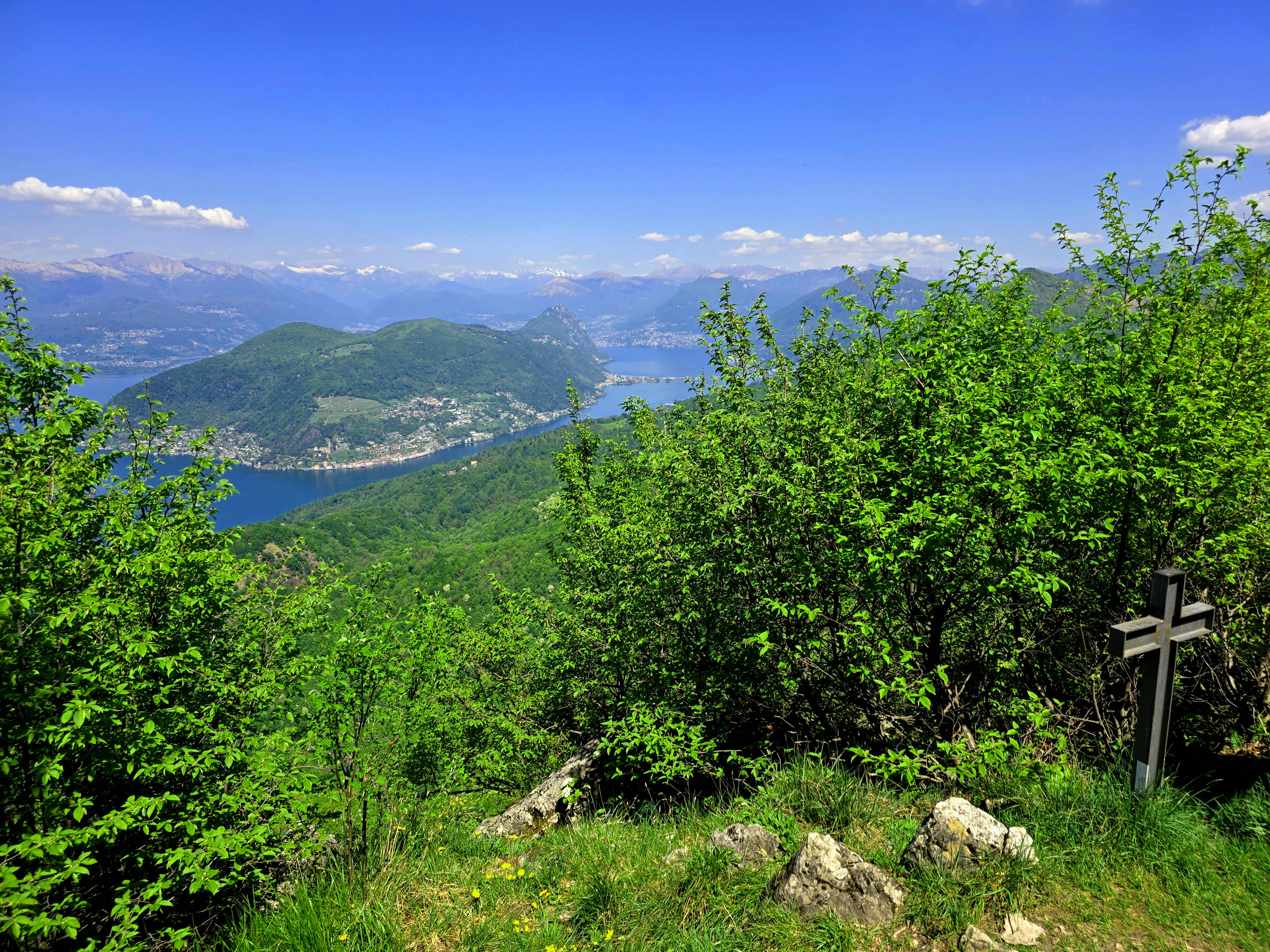
Lugano Lake from Monte Orsa

Monte Orsa is a mountain of Lombardy, Italy, with an elevation of 998 metres (3,274 ft). It is located in the Varese Prealps, in the Province of Varese, near the border with Switzerland.

Overlooking Lake Lugano on the northern side and the towns of Saltrio and Viggiù on the southern side, Monte Orsa is the third highest peak of the Val Ceresio after Monte Piambello and Monte Pravello.

A road reaches the peak, where two large repeaters are located, starting from Viggiù, but has been closed to traffic since 2013. Several hiking paths also lead to the summit.

Well-preserved trenches, tunnels, machine-gun posts and observation posts of the Cadorna Line can be visited on the sides and just below the summit of the mountain.
