= Monte San Martino (Varese Prealps) =

Mountain in Italy

Coordinates: 45°55′37″N 8°44′41″E

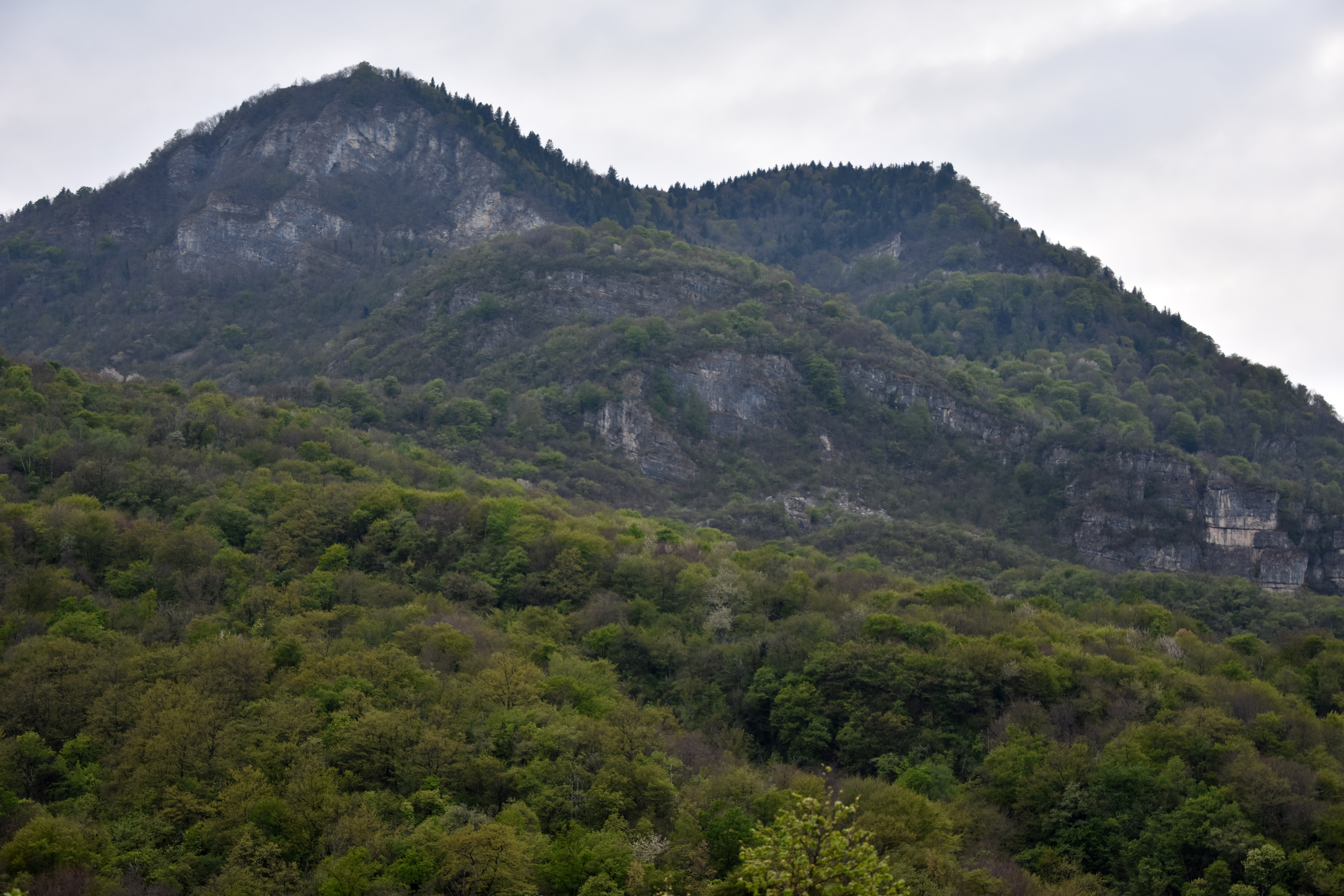
- San Martino seen from Cassano Valcuvia

Highest point
- Elevation: 1,087 m (3,566 ft)

Geography
- Location within Lombardy
- Location: Lombardy, Italy
- Parent range: Varese Prealps

Monte San Martino is a mountain of Lombardy, Italy, with an elevation of 1,087 metres (3,566 ft). It is located in the Varese Prealps, in the Province of Varese, overlooking the Valcuvia.

The mountain was fortified during the First World War, when trenches, observation posts, shelters, galleries and artillery batteries were built as part of the Cadorna Line, aimed at preventing an invasion from Switzerland. During the Second World War, in November 1943, Monte San Martino was the location of one of the first clashes between Italian partisans, led by Colonel Carlo Croce, and German and Fascist forces.

The peak, where a small church (San Martino in Culmine) is located, can be reached by car from Duno, or through paths that allow hikers to visit the restored remains of the Cadorna Line.
