= Campo dei Fiori Regional Park =

Nature reserve in Lombardy, Italy

Parco regionale Campo dei Fiori
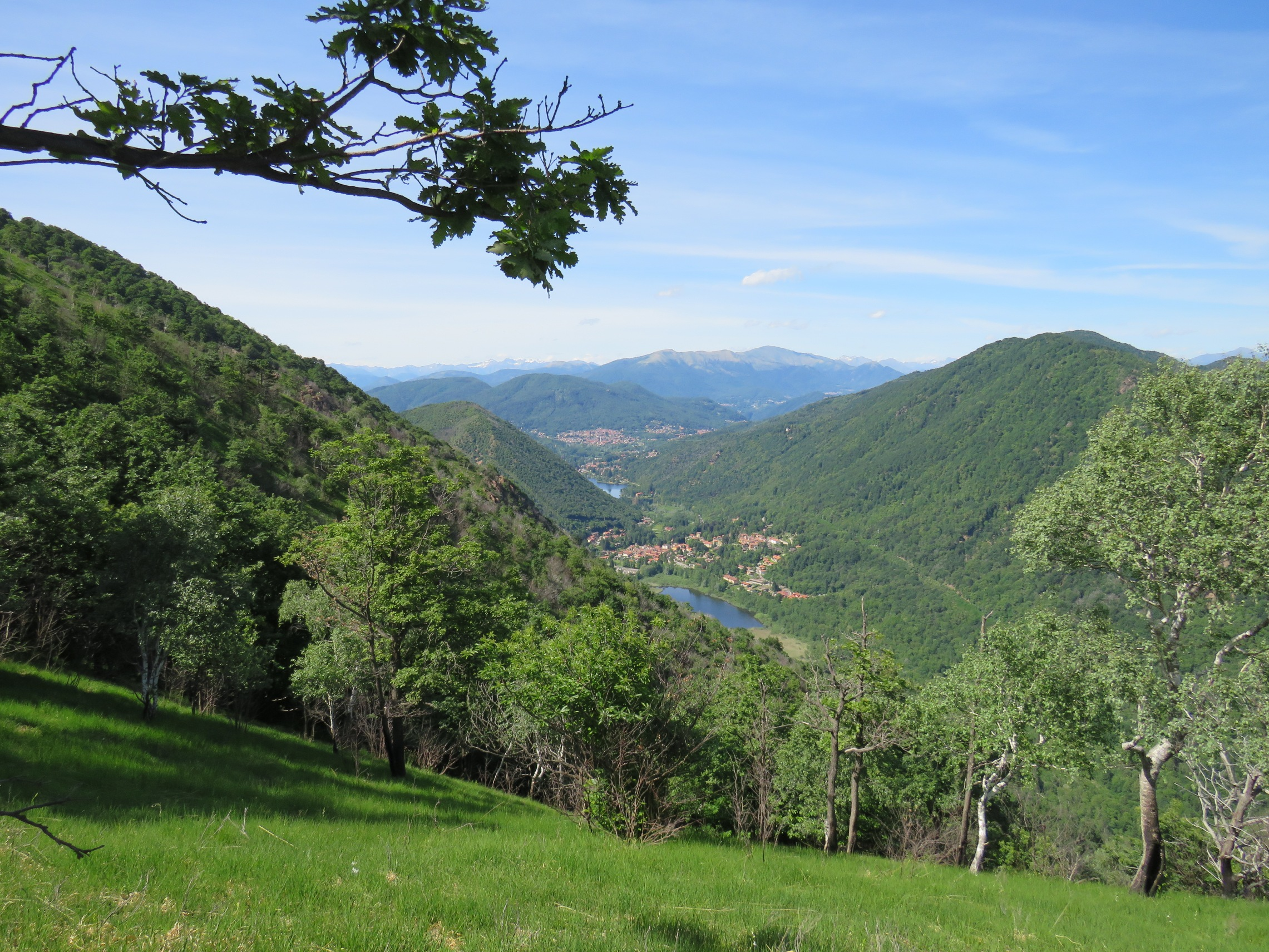
- Interactive map of Parco regionale Campo dei Fiori
- Location: Lombardy, Italy
- Coordinates: 45°52′08″N 08°46′28″E
- Area: 6,300 ha (15,600 acres)
- Established: 1984
- Website: www.parcocampodeifiori.it/hh/index.php

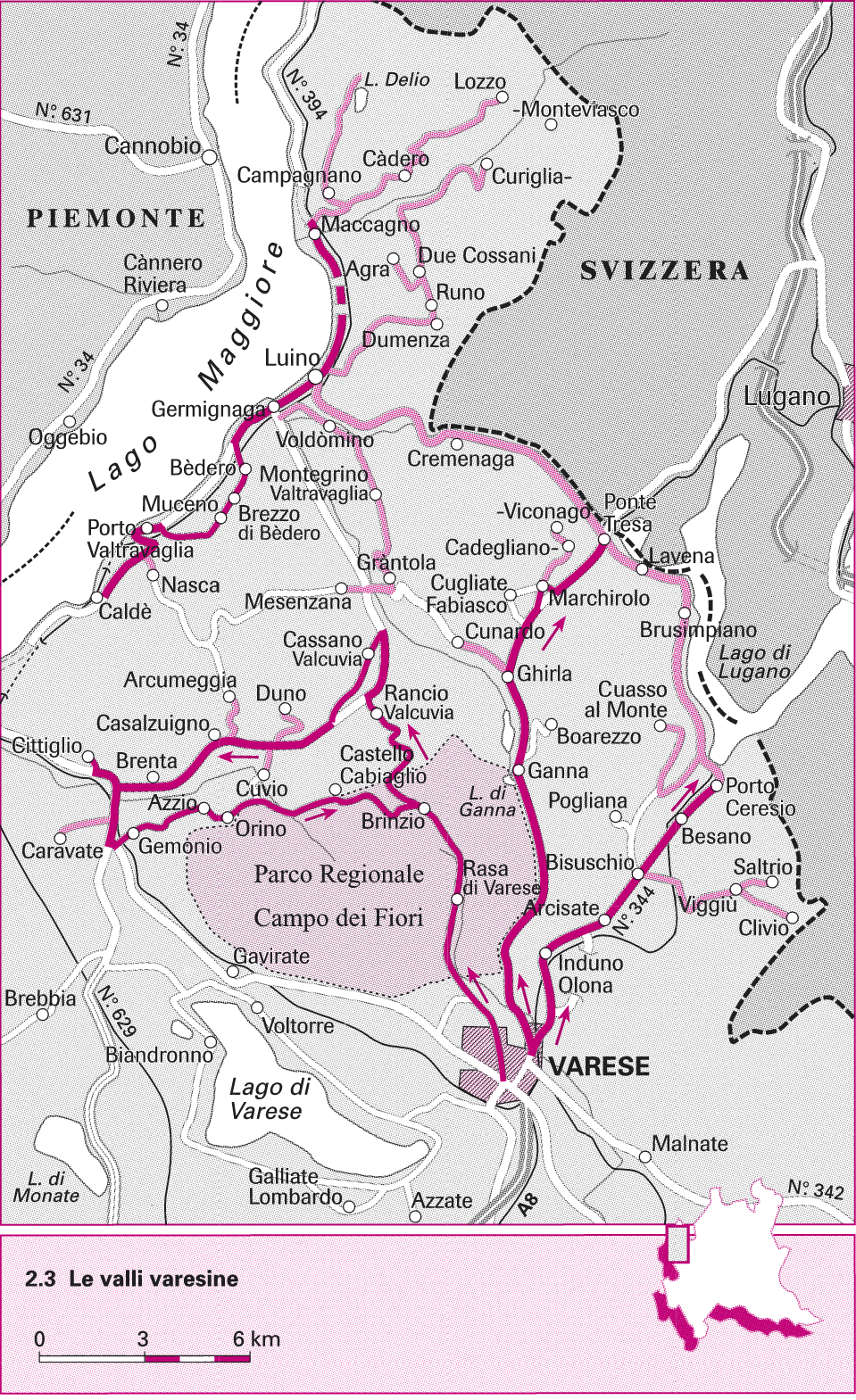
Location map of the park within the territory of the Varese valleys

The Campo dei Fiori Regional Park (Italian: Parco regionale Campo dei Fiori) is a nature reserve in Lombardy, Italy. Established in 1984 and enlarged in 2009, it comprises the Campo dei Fiori and Martica massifs in the Varese Prealps, between the Valganna, the Valcuvia and the city of Varese.

The park, which covers the territory of fourteen municipalities (all in the province of Varese), includes the UNESCO World Heritage site of the Sacro Monte di Varese and the Site of Community Importance of the Campo dei Fiori caves (all told, 130 caves are found inside the park, with an overall extension of 30 kilometres). Also part of the park are six natural reserves: Lake Ganna, Lake Brinzio, Campo dei Fiori, Martica-Chiusarella, and the bogs of Carecc and Pau Majur. The park's lowest point is 370 metres above sea level, the highest is the Punta di Mezzo of the Campo di Fiori, 1,227 metres above sea level.

The flora includes chestnuts, ashes, lindens, sycamores, beeches, birches, Scotch pines, and maples; fifteen trees have been designated as "green monuments" due to their size and age. The fauna includes red deer, roe deer, wild boars, foxes, hares, beech martens, European badgers, European fat dormouses, European polecats, red squirrels, black kites, European honey buzzards, common buzzards, Eurasian sparrowhawks, Eurasian goshawks, peregrine falcons, short-toed snake eagles, and Western marsh harriers.

The park is crossed by twenty main marked hiking paths as well as a number of unmarked secondary paths.
