= Carlo Croce =

Carlo Croce may refer to:

- Carlo Croce (soldier) (1892–1944), Italian soldier and Resistance member during World War II
- Carlo M. Croce (born 1944), Italian medical doctor
- Carlo Croce (sailor) (born 1945), Italian yacht racer
