= Induno Olona =

- Comune
- Comune di Induno Olona
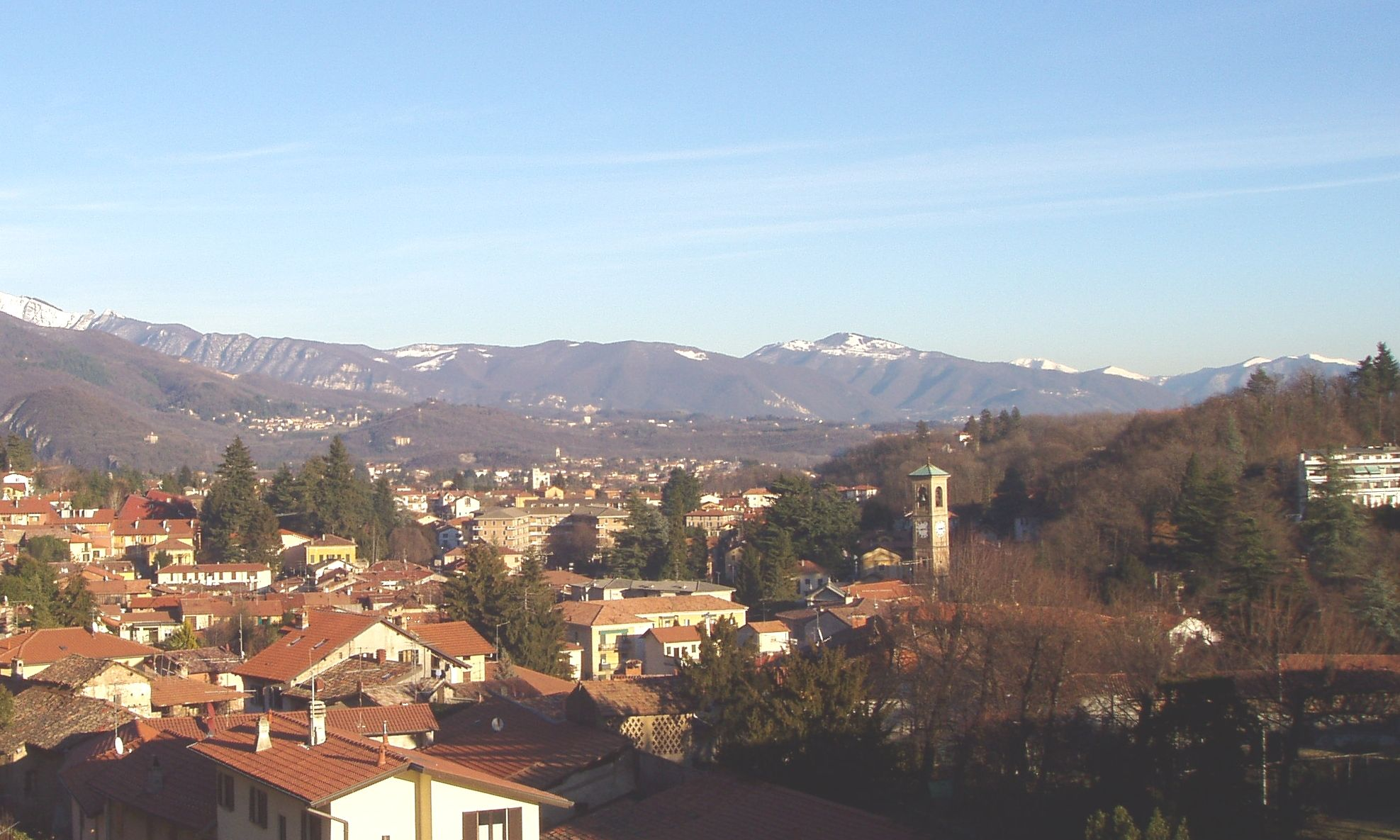

- Coat of arms

- Location within Italy Location within Lombardy
- Coordinates: 45°51′08″N 08°50′19″E
- Country: Italy
- Region: Lombardy
- Province: Varese (VA)
- Frazioni: Olona, Frascarolo, Motta, Pezza, Dardo, Broglio, San Paolo, San Pietro, San Cassano, San Bernardino

Government
  - Mayor: Marco Cavallin

Area
  - Total: 12.45 km^{2} (4.81 sq mi)
- Elevation: 394 m (1,293 ft)

Population (31 December 2017)
  - Total: 10,252
  - Density: 823.5/km^{2} (2,133/sq mi)
- Demonym: Indunesi (d'Olona)
- Time zone: UTC+1 (CET)
  - Summer (DST): UTC+2 (CEST)
- Postal code: 21056
- Dialing code: 0332
- Patron saint: San Giovanni Battista/Saint John the Baptist
- Website: Official website

Induno Olona is a town and comune in Italy, in north-western Lombardy, 60 kilometres (37 mi) north of Milan, in the Province of Varese. It had a population, in 2021, of c. 10,287.

== Topography ==
The town is located between Valganna and Valceresio and it is crossed by the river Olona. Among the Prealps of Varese, in particular under Monte Monarco (832 metres above sea level).

At the end of World War II, on 25 October 1950, after a referendum, Induno became an independent town.
