= Monte Castelvecchio =

Mountain in Italy

- Location within Lombardy Location within Italy

Highest point
- Elevation: 623 m (2,044 ft)
- Coordinates: 45°56′56″N 8°47′51″E

Geography
- Location: Lombardy, Italy
- Parent range: Varese Prealps

Monte Castelvecchio is a mountain in Lombardy, Italy, with an elevation of 623 metres (2,044 ft). It is located in the Varese Prealps, in the Province of Varese, in the municipality of Cunardo.

Due to its commanding position over the Valcuvia and Val Marchirolo, Monte Castelvecchio has been fortified since the Early Middle Ages. In 900 Liutprand, King of the Lombards, built a fort (later a castle) atop the mountain, which later came under the control of the House of Visconti; the castle, from which the mountain derives its current name (Castelvecchio meaning "old castle"), was burned in 1164, 1447 and 1517. In the 18th century, the ruins were dismantled and the material used to build Cunardo's parish church.
