= Monte Sette Termini =

Mountain in Italy

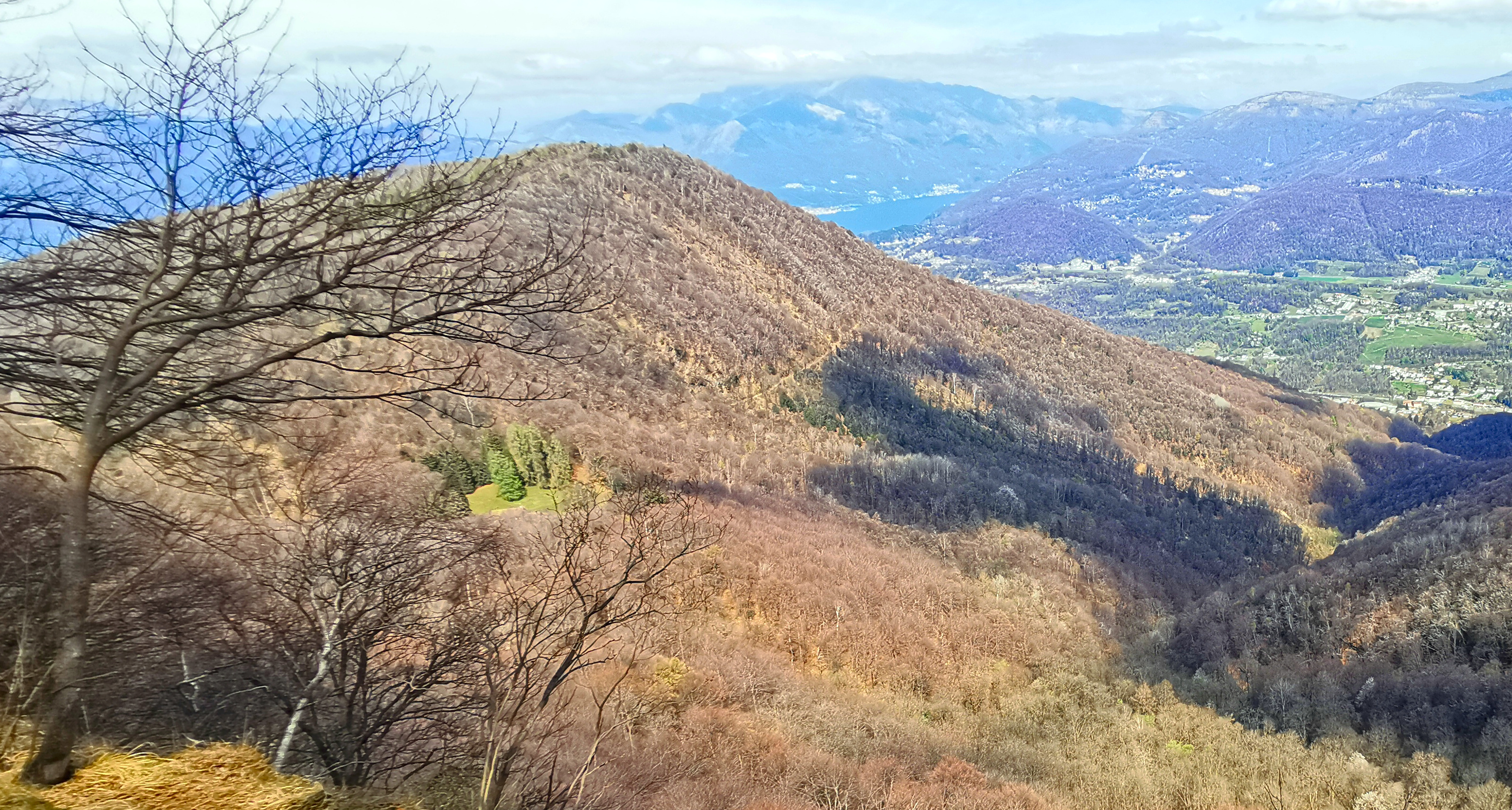
- Sette Termini seen from Monte La Nave

Highest point
- Elevation: 972 m (3,189 ft)
- Prominence: 147 m (482 ft)
- Coordinates: 45°58′20″N 8°47′57″E

Geography
- Location within Lombardy
- Location: Lombardy, Italy
- Parent range: Varese Prealps

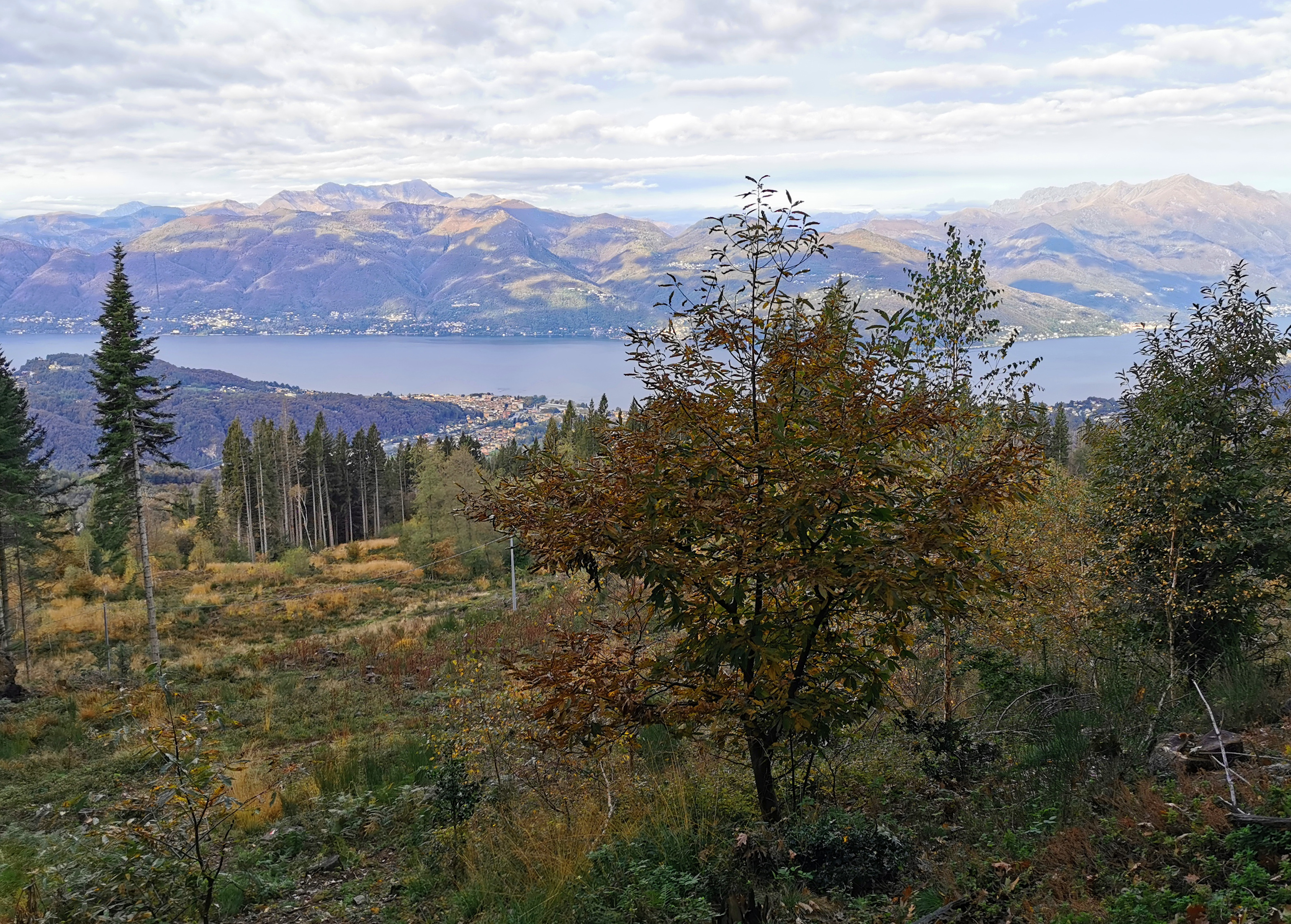
Montegrino Valtravagliaː Lake Maggiore from the trail to Monte Sette Termini

Monte Sette Termini, also known as I Bedroni or I Bedeloni, is a mountain of Lombardy, Italy, with an elevation of 972 metres (3,189 ft). It is located in the Varese Prealps, in the Province of Varese, a few kilometers from the border with Switzerland.

Its name ("Seven Limits") is derived from seven rocks that once marked the limits of the territory of seven surrounding villages (Cugliate, Fabiasco, Arbizzo, Viconago, Montegrino, Bosco and Cremenaga).

The sides of the mountain are covered in woods, mostly birches, known as Bedroni or Bedeloni in Lombard dialect. Beeches, Cornish oaks, Italian oaks, pines and ashes are also present. During the First World War the Sette Termini was fortified as part of the Cadorna Line, aimed at preventing an invasion from Switzerland; its remains can still be seen.

An old military road from Cugliate-Fabiasco and Montegrino Valtravaglia leads till near the peak.
