= Pizzo di Cuvignone =

Mountain in Italy

Coordinates: 45°55′54″N 8°40′21″E

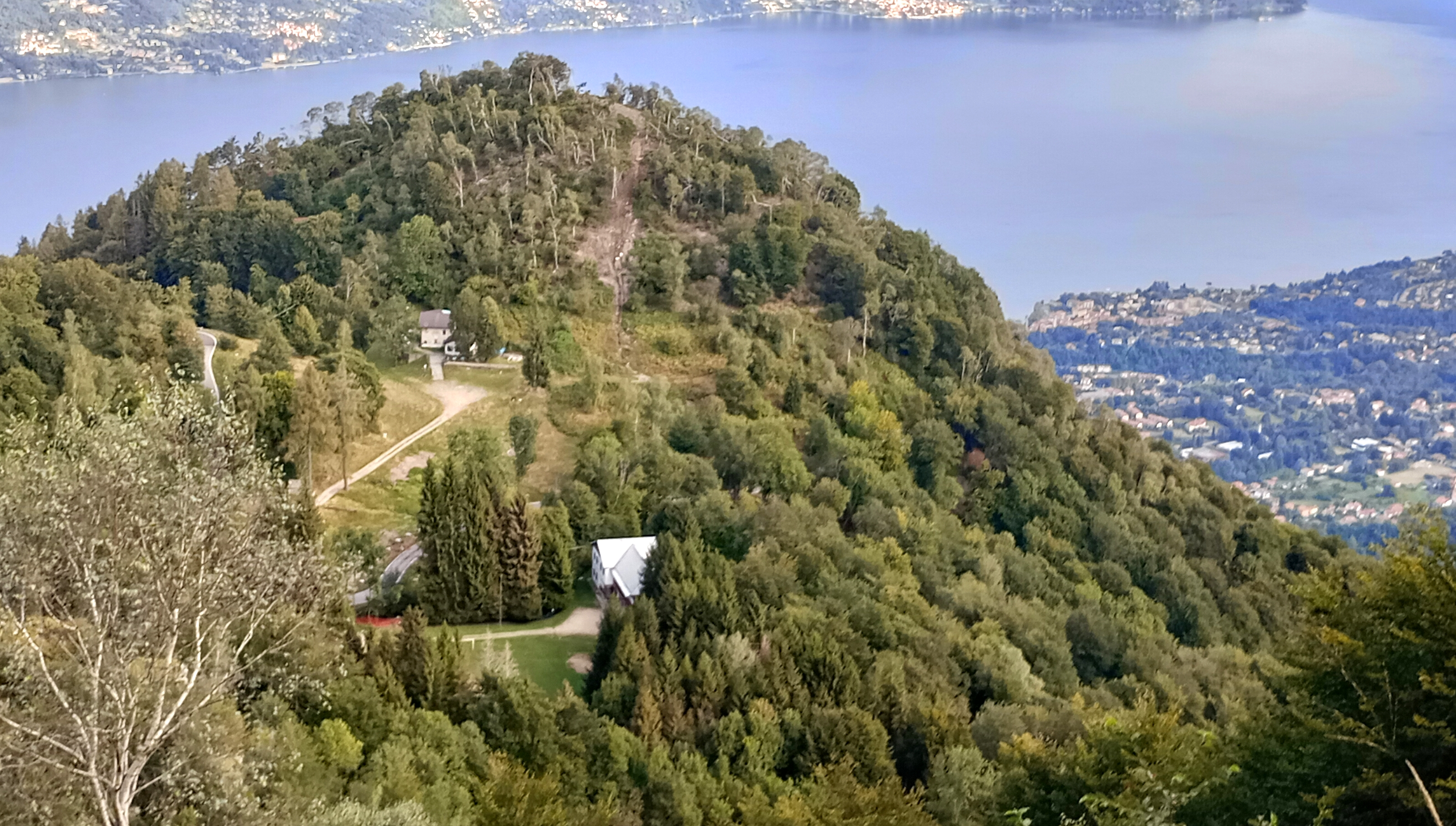

Highest point
- Elevation: 1,018 m (3,340 ft)

Geography
- Location: Lombardy, Italy
- Parent range: Varese Prealps

The Pizzo di Cuvignone is a mountain of Lombardy, Italy, with an elevation of 1,018 metres (3,340 ft). It is located in the Varese Prealps, in the Province of Varese, near the Cuvignone Pass which links the Valtravaglia to the Valcuvia.

It is mostly composed of limestone and covered in woods of oak, ash, beech and birch.

The peak can be reached by hiking paths from the pass or from Caldè, on Lake Maggiore. A mountain hut operated by the Italian Alpine Club, Rifugio De Grandi Adamoli, is located a short distance from the peak.
