= Monte Paglione =

Mountain in Italy and Switzerland

- Location within Italy Location within Switzerland

Highest point
- Elevation: 1,554 m (5,098 ft)
- Coordinates: 46°06′06″N 8°48′22″E

Geography
- Location: Lombardy, Italy and Canton Ticino, Switzerland
- Parent range: Varese Prealps

Monte Paglione is a mountain of the Varese Prealps, with an elevation of 1,554 metres (5,098 ft).

== Details ==
It is located on the border between Italy (Lombardy) and Switzerland (Canton Ticino), and represents the northernmost point of the Province of Varese.

Its sides are covered in beech woods, whereas the peak, overlooking Lake Maggiore, is grassy.

The peak can be reached on foot from Italy (Passo Forcora) or Switzerland (Indemini, Monti di Gerra).
