= Monte Legnoncino =

Mountain in Italy

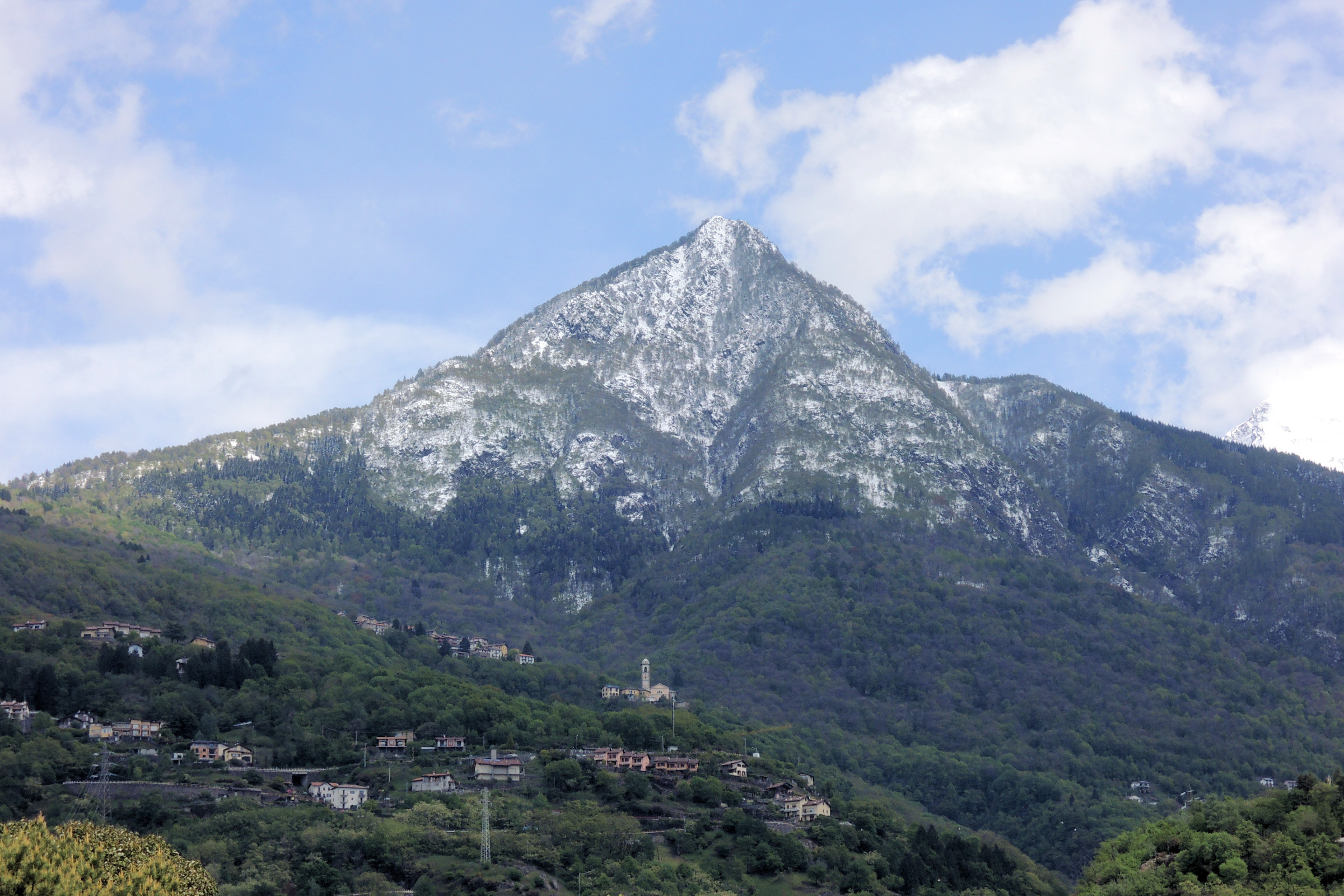
- Monte Legnoncino seen from Dervio

Highest point
- Elevation: 1,718 m (5,636 ft)

Geography
- Location: Lombardy, Italy
- Parent range: Orobic Alps

Monte Legnoncino is a mountain of the Orobic Alps, in the Italian region of Lombardy, with an elevation of 1,718 metres (5,636 ft).

Located at the western end of the Orobic Alps, overlooking northern Lake Como, on the border between the provinces of Lecco and Sondrio, the Legnoncino is part of the Monte Legnone massif. The Sella del Legnone, where the Rifugio Roccoli Lorla is located, divides Monte Legnoncino from the higher Monte Legnone; Legnoncino means "little Legnone" in Italian.

The peak of the Legnoncino can be reached in less than an hour from the Rifugio Roccoli Lorla, either through a hiking path or an old military road. Trenches and tunnels of the Cadorna Line can be found all over the mountain.

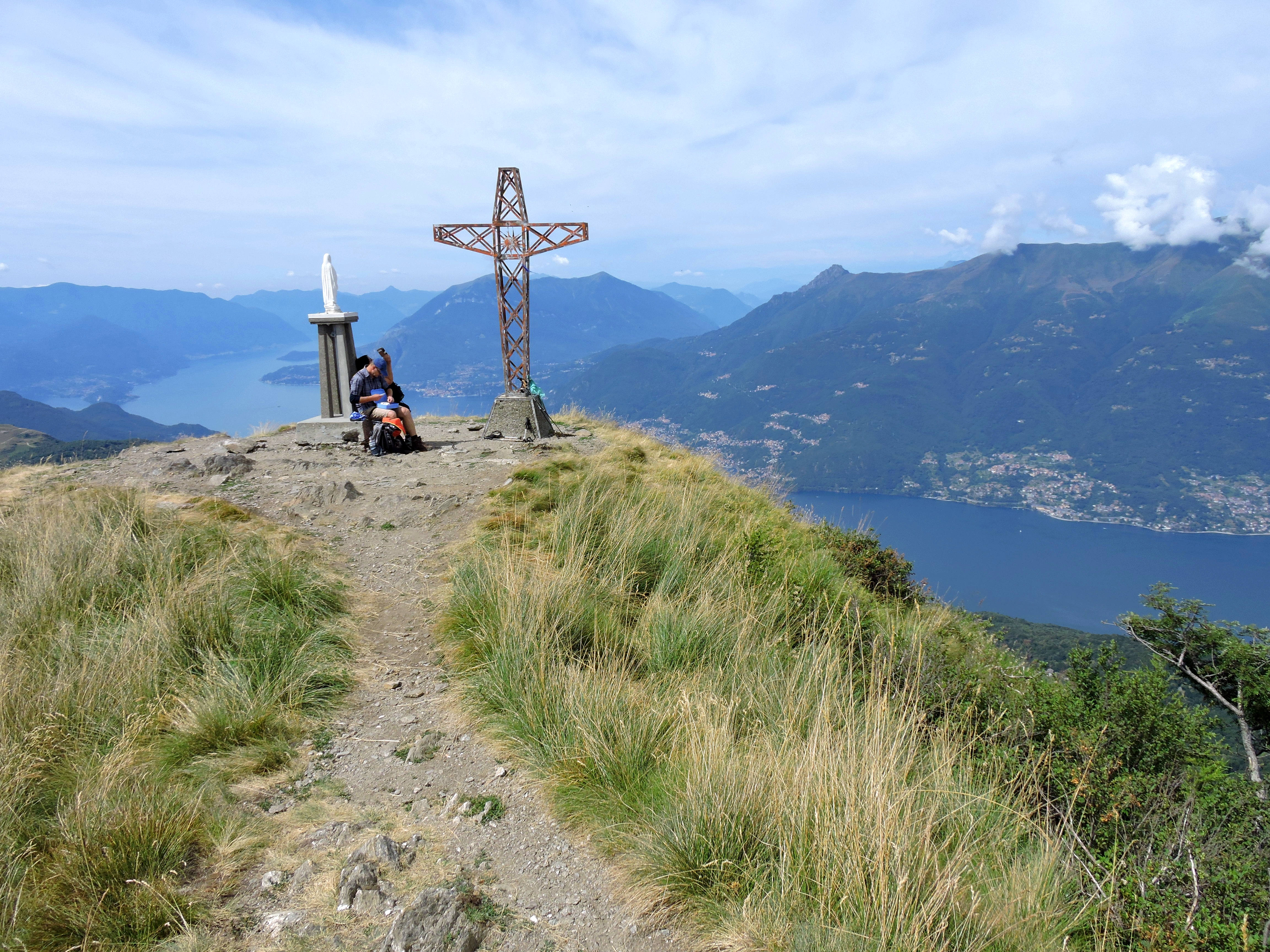
Lake Como, seen from the summit of Monte Legnoncino
