= Monte Nudo =

Mountain in Italy

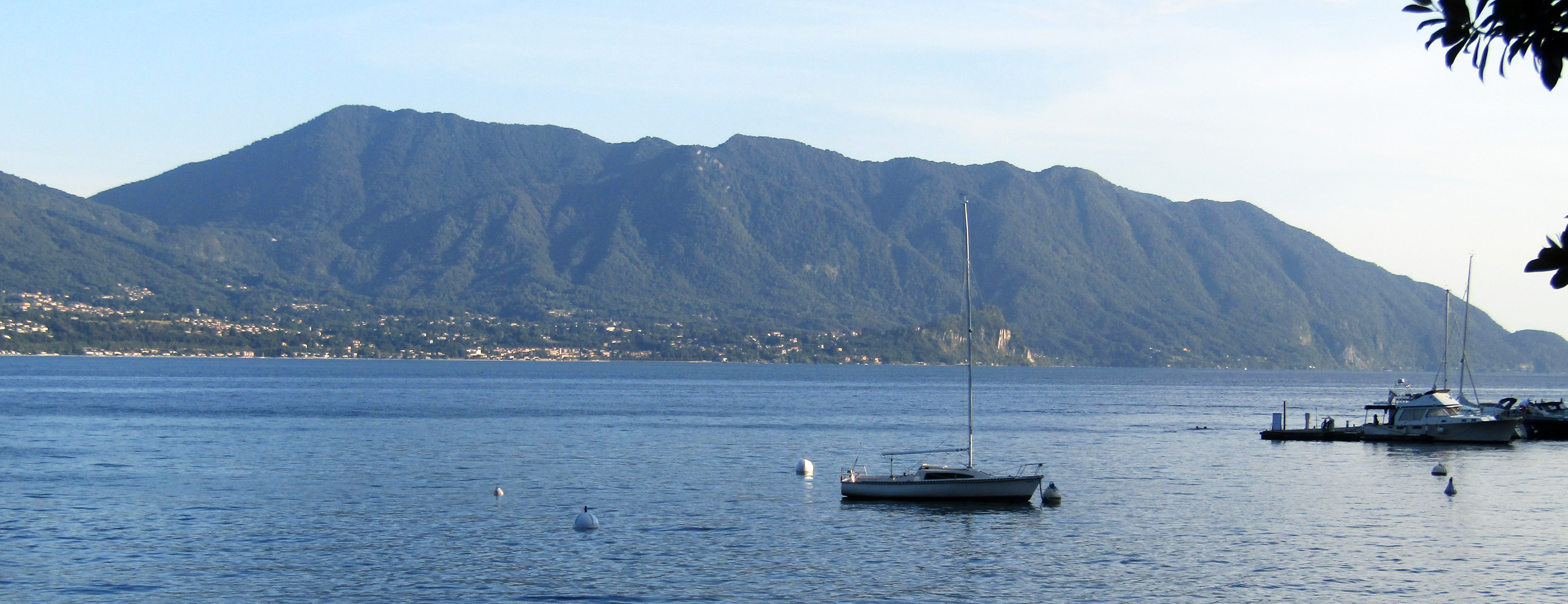

Highest point
- Elevation: 1,237 m (4,058 ft)
- Prominence: 953 m (3,127 ft)
- Coordinates: 45°55′24″N 08°41′18″E

Geography
- Location: Lombardy, Italy
- Parent range: Lugano Prealps

Monte Nudo is a mountain of Lombardy, Italy. It has an elevation of 1,237 metres. Administratively it belongs to the province of Varese.

== Etymology ==
In Italian Nudo means Naked; this comes from the lack of trees which characterized the mountain until the 1970s.

== SOIUSA classification ==
According to the SOIUSA (International Standardized Mountain Subdivision of the Alps) the mountain can be classified in the following way:

- main part = Western Alps
- major sector = North Western Alps
- section = Lugano Prealps
- subsection = Varese Prealps
- supergroup = Catena Piambello-Campo dei Fiori-Nudo
- group = Gruppo del Nudo
- subgroup = Gruppo del Monte Nudo
- code = I/B-11.II-B.4.c
