= Monte Rogoria =

Mountain in Switzerland

- Monte Rogorio, Motto Croce
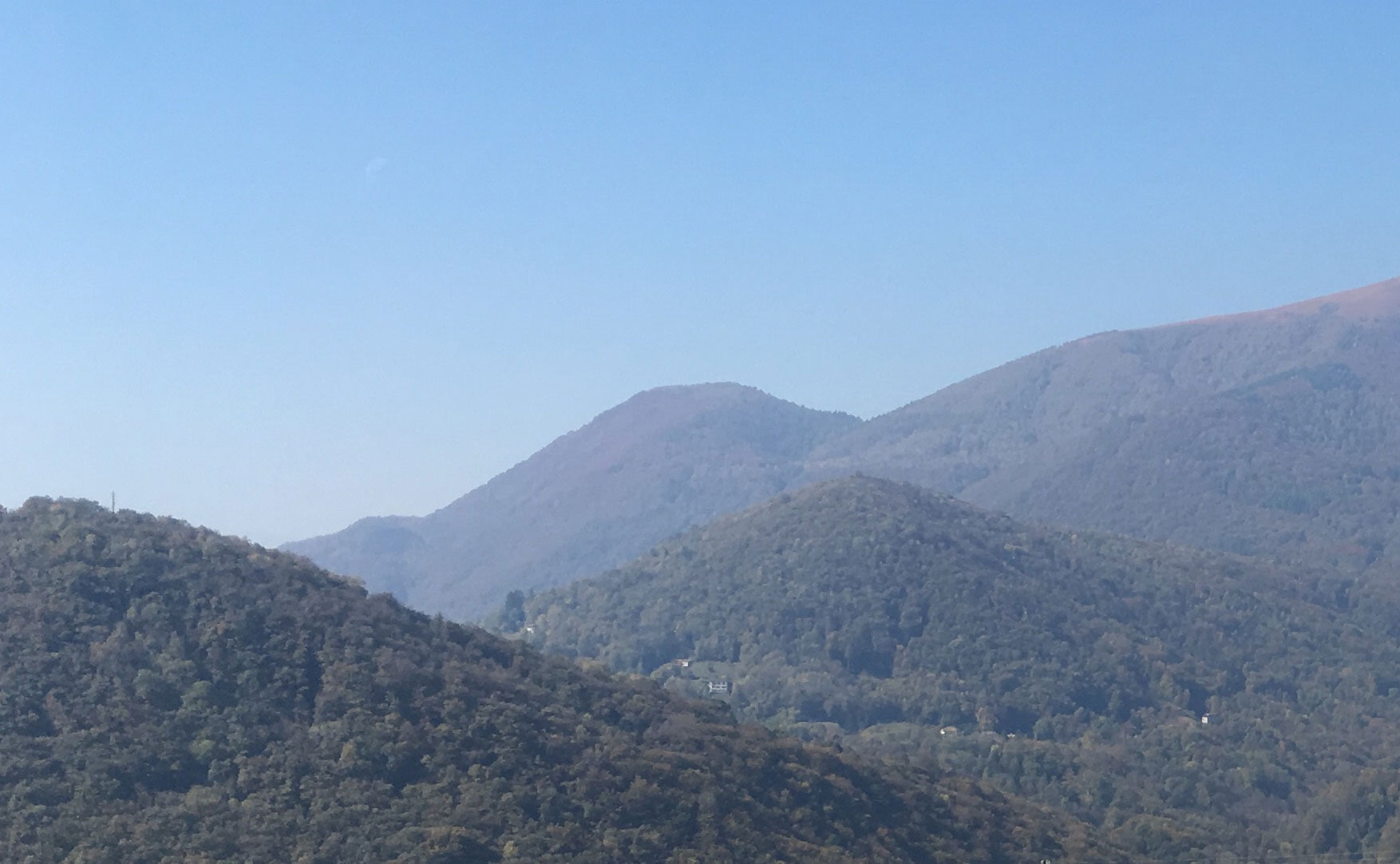
- In the center of the horizon: Monte Rogoria

Highest point
- Elevation: 1,184 m (3,885 ft)
- Prominence: 67 m (220 ft)Forcola / Passo di Monte Faëta
- Coordinates: 46°1′21.5″N 8°49′14.84″E

Geography
- Location within Alps Location within Switzerland Location within Italy
- Location: Ticino, Switzerland / Lombardy, Italy
- Parent range: Lugano Prealps

Monte Rogoria (also known as Monte Rogorio or Motto Croce) is a mountain of the Lugano Prealps, located on the border between Switzerland and Italy, north of Astano, at the foot of the Monte Lema. The summit and the majority of the mountain are in the Swiss canton of Ticino, whilst a part of the north-western flank lies in the Italian region of Lombardy. It has an elevation of 1,184 metres above sea level. The view from the summit of the mountain encompasses the Lake Maggiore, the Borromean Islands and the Monte Rosa massif. There is no official hiking trail leading to the summit itself, but there are trails to the mountain pass Forcola respectively Passo di Monte Faëta at an altitude of 1,117 metres located close to the summit plateau. Starting points are: Astano, Miglieglia and Dumenza.
