= Monte Gradiccioli =

Mountain in Switzerland

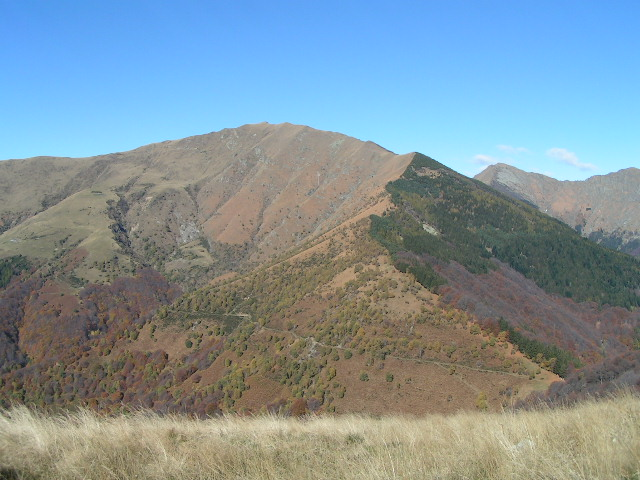
- The east side

Highest point
- Elevation: 1,936 m (6,352 ft)
- Prominence: 213 m (699 ft)
- Parent peak: Monte Tamaro
- Coordinates: 46°05′03.5″N 8°51′57″E

Geography
- Location within Switzerland
- Location: Ticino, Switzerland
- Parent range: Lugano Prealps

Monte Gradiccioli is a mountain of the Lugano Prealps, located between Indemini and Sigirino in the canton of Ticino. It lies south of Monte Tamaro, on the range between Lake Maggiore and Lake Lugano.
