= Monte Chiusarella =

Mountain in Italy

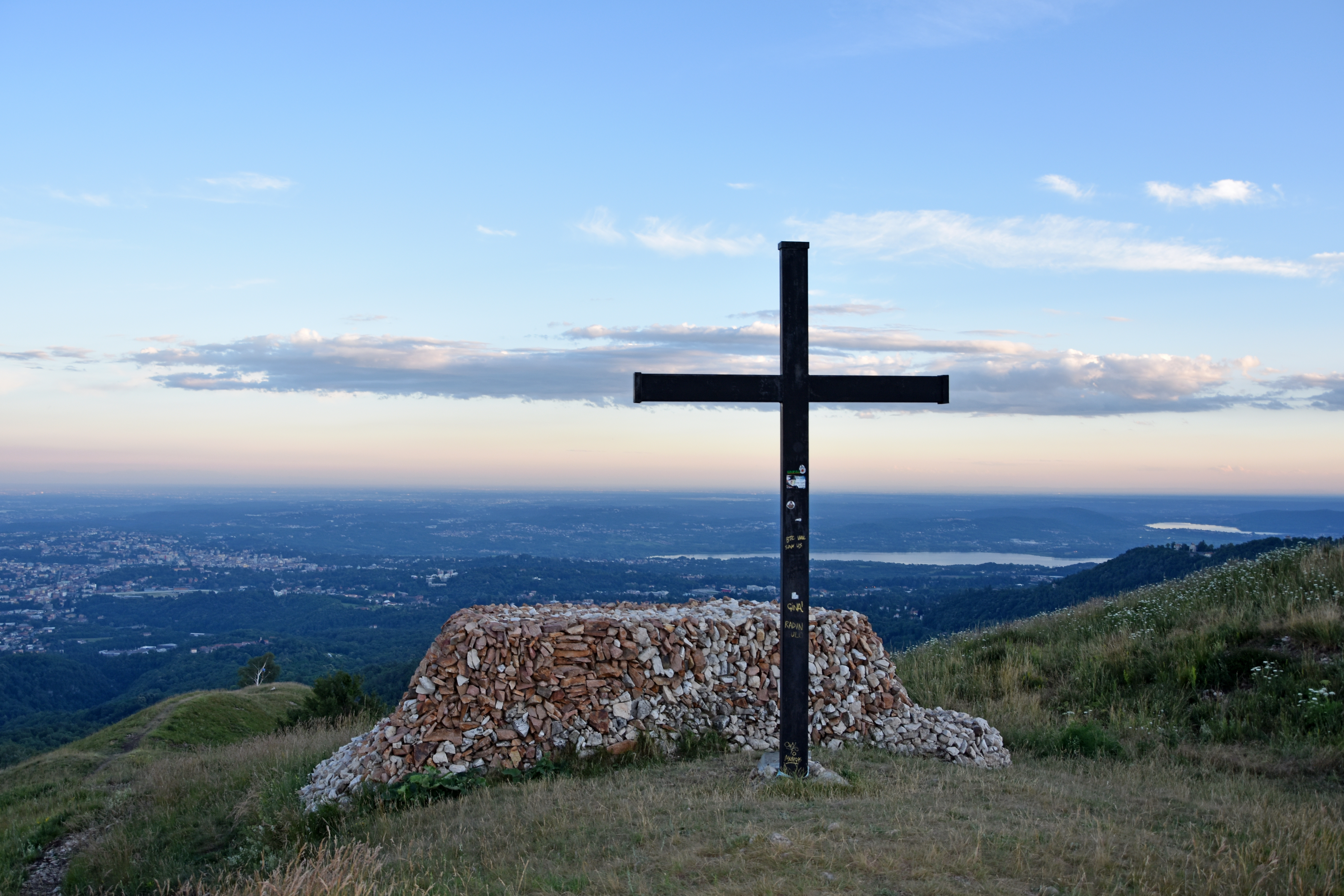
- Cross near the peak of the mountain

Highest point
- Elevation: 913 m (2,995 ft)
- Coordinates: 45°52′24.10″N 8°48′51.48″E

Geography
- Location within Alps
- Location: Lombardy, Italy
- Parent range: Varese Prealps

Monte Chiusarella is a mountain of Lombardy, Italy, with an elevation of 913 metres (2,995 ft). It is located in the Varese Prealps, in the Province of Varese, within the nature reserve of Campo dei Fiori.
