= Monte Tamaro =

Mountain in Switzerland

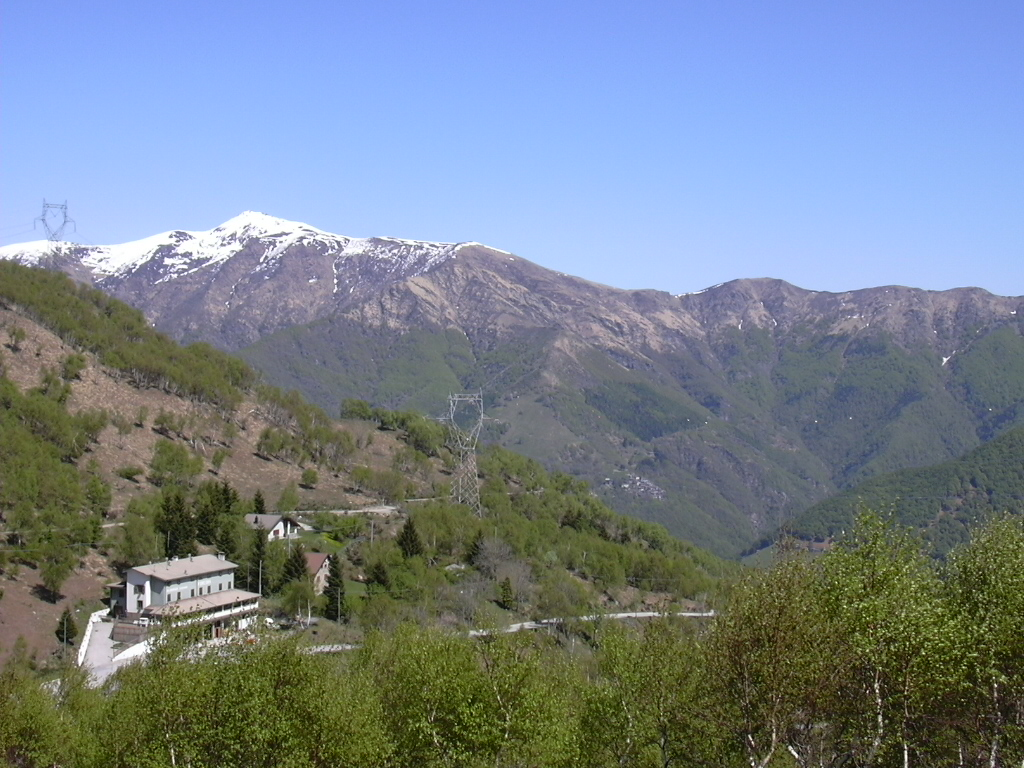

Highest point
- Elevation: 1,962 m (6,437 ft)
- Prominence: 1,408 m (4,619 ft)
- Isolation: 13.3 km (8.3 mi)
- Coordinates: 46°06′14.1″N 8°51′57.7″E

Geography
- Location within Switzerland
- Location: Ticino, Switzerland
- Parent range: Lugano Prealps

Climbing
- Easiest route: Aerial tramway and trail to the summit

Monte Tamaro is a mountain of the Lugano Prealps, overlooking Lake Maggiore in the Swiss canton of Ticino. Reaching a height of 1,962 metres above sea level, it is the highest summit of the chain located between Lake Maggiore and Lake Lugano, which also includes Monte Lema. It is also the most prominent summit of the canton.

== SOIUSA classification ==
According to the SOIUSA (International Standardized Mountain Subdivision of the Alps) the mountain can be classified in the following way:

- main part = Western Alps
- major sector = North Western Alps
- section = Lugano Prealps
- subsection = Varese Prealps
- supergroup = Catena Tamaro-Gambarogno-Lema
- group = Gruppo del Tamaro
- subgroup = Massiccio del Tamaro
- code = I/B-11.II-A.1.a

== See also ==
- List of most isolated mountains of Switzerland

== Notes ==
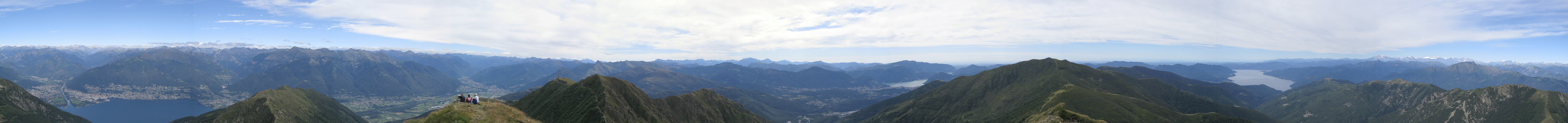
Panorama from the summit of Monte Tamaro.
