= Poncione Rosso =

Mountain in Switzerland

- Location within Switzerland

Highest point
- Elevation: 2,505 m (8,219 ft)
- Prominence: 272 m (892 ft)
- Parent peak: Cima di Bri
- Coordinates: 46°17′57.6″N 8°54′41.6″E

Geography
- Location: Ticino, Switzerland
- Parent range: Lepontine Alps

The Poncione Rosso is a mountain of the Lepontine Alps, located in the Swiss canton of Ticino. It lies on the chain separating the valleys of Verzasca and Leventina.
