= Monte Lema =

Mountain in Switzerland

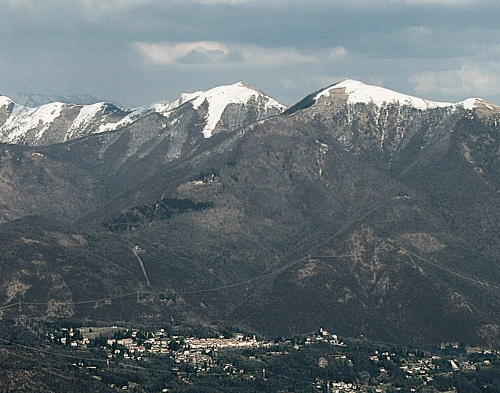

Highest point
- Elevation: 1,621 m (5,318 ft)
- Prominence: 140 m (460 ft)
- Parent peak: Monte Tamaro
- Coordinates: 46°2′24.2″N 8°49′54.4″E

Geography
- Location within Alps
- Location: Ticino, Switzerland; Lombardy, Italy
- Parent range: Lugano Prealps

Climbing
- Easiest route: Aerial tramway

Monte Lema (1,621 m) is a mountain of the Lugano Prealps, located on the border between Switzerland and Italy. Its summit can easily reached by cable car from the village of Miglieglia (Ticino).

== SOIUSA classification ==
According to the SOIUSA (International Standardized Mountain Subdivision of the Alps) the mountain can be classified in the following way:

- main part = Western Alps
- major sector = North Western Alps
- section = Lugano Prealps
- subsection = Varese Prealps
- supergroup = Catena Tamaro-Gambarogno-Lema
- group = Gruppo del Tamaro
- subgroup = Gruppo del Lema
- code = I/B-11.II-A.1.c

== See also ==
- List of mountains of Switzerland accessible by public transport
