= Poncione di Vespero =

Mountain in Switzerland

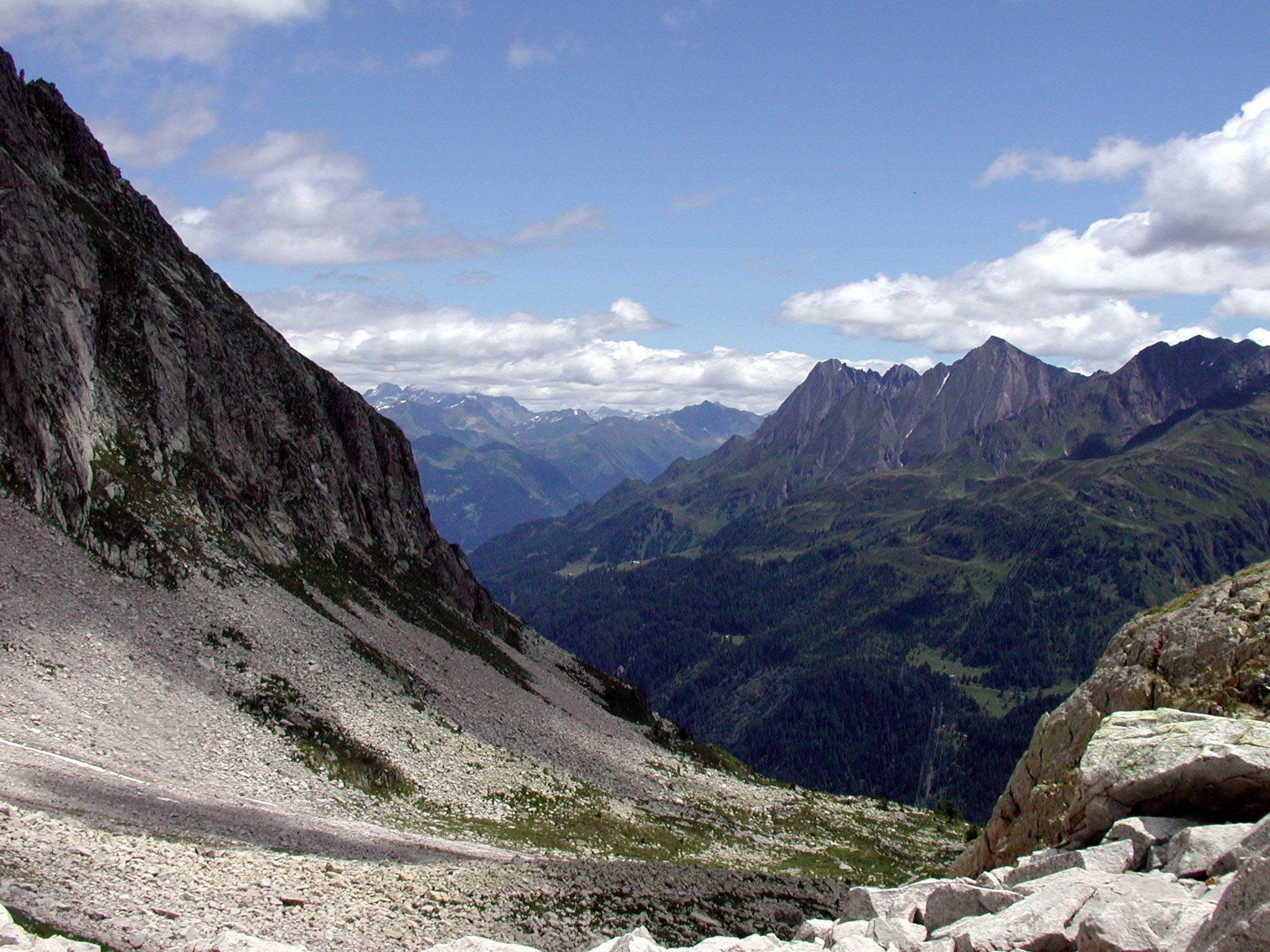
- Poncione di Vespero (center-right) from the northern side

Highest point
- Elevation: 2,717 m (8,914 ft)
- Prominence: 103 m (338 ft)
- Parent peak: Il Madone
- Coordinates: 46°29′58.9″N 8°34′52.6″E

Geography
- Location: Ticino, Switzerland
- Parent range: Lepontine Alps

The Poncione di Vespero is a mountain of the Lepontine Alps, overlooking Airolo in the Swiss canton of Ticino.
