= Carlo Croce (soldier) =

Italian officer and WWII Resistance member

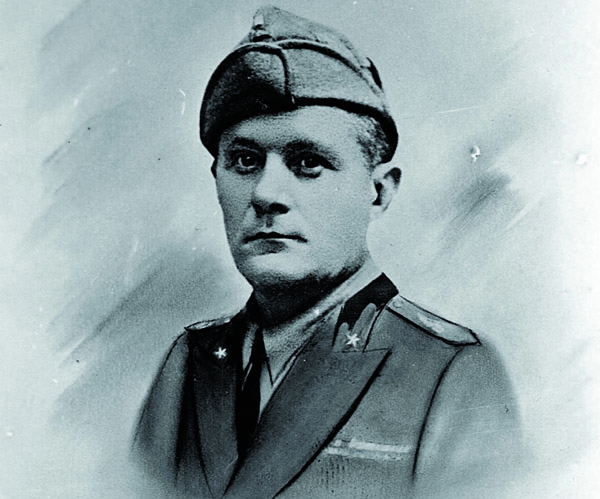
- Born: 15 April 1892; Milan, Kingdom of Italy
- Died: 24 July 1944 (aged 52); Bergamo, Italian Social Republic
- Military career
- Allegiance: Kingdom of Italy
- Branch: Royal Italian Army
- Rank: Colonel
- Conflicts: World War I; First Battle of the Piave; World War II; Italian campaign on the Eastern Front; Italian campaign
- Awards: Gold Medal of Military Valour (posthumous); Bronze Medal of Military Valor

Carlo Croce (15 April 1892 – 24 July 1944) was an Italian officer and Resistance member during World War II.

== Biography ==
He was born in Milan on April 15, 1892, the son of Gaetano Croce and Maria Ferri. After carrying out his military service in the Royal Italian Army, he was discharged on 4 June 1912, but was immediately recalled to active service on 5 August of the same year, and assigned to the 5th Bersaglieri Regiment. He was promoted to corporal and then to corporal major (December 5, 1913), and sergeant (October 31, 1914). After the Kingdom of Italy entered the First World War, on 25 October 1915 he became an officer cadet, and was promoted to second lieutenant on the following 17 December, while serving with the 7th Bersaglieri Regiment. He then became lieutenant from 29 December 1916 and captain on 1 August 1918, serving in the 22nd, 12th and then again in the 7th Bersaglieri Regiment; in November 1917 he was awarded the Bronze Medal of Military Valor for having led a successful counterattack during the First Battle of the Piave. After being discharged on April 9, 1920, he settled in Milan and started a company that built wheelchairs; he married Albertina Seveso and had three children, Alda, Alberto, and Adriana (born in 1937). On 22 February 1939 he was promoted to major in the Army reserve, and in 1942 he was recalled into active service during World War II. On 13 June 1943 he left for the Eastern Front with the ARMIR, being promoted to lieutenant colonel on March 23, 1943; he later returned to Italy and was promoted to colonel.

At the proclamation of the Armistice of Cassibile, on 8 September 1943, Croce was in command of a detachment of the 3rd Bersaglieri Regiment stationed in Porto Valtravaglia, Lombardy, consisting of two battalions as well as untrained recruits of the Regia Aeronautica. Left without orders, he witnessed the collapse of the Royal Italian Army as the Wehrmacht occupied Italy; after a few days, as his own men were starting to desert, he decided to move with his troops to the old fortifications of the Cadorna Line, on the mountains around Varese. He obtained weapons and ammunition, which his detachment lacked, from the barracks in nearby Luino and Laveno and from soldiers fleeing towards Switzerland, gathering Carcano rifles, a few automatic weapons and pistols, a considerable number of hand grenades and about ten thousand rounds of ammunition. Most of his men had meanwhile left, at one point leaving him with only ten soldiers, but they were replaced by dispersed soldiers from other units, still willing to fight the Germans, as well as civilian volunteers and anti-Fascists; by late October 1943 Croce thus found himself in command of a partisan group of about 170 men, which he baptized "Gruppo Cinque Giornate" (after the Five Days of Milan) and divided into three companies.

The group restored the neglected fortifications of the Cadorna Line on Monte San Martino and prepared to fight the Germans and their allies of the newly established Italian Social Republic. Croce tried to organize his partisan detachment like a regular Army unit, and kept using the tactics of conventional warfare, which would soon prove unsuitable for the kind of guerrilla that would be fought in the mountains of northern Italy; the National Liberation Committee for Northern Italy tried to persuade him to divide his men into smaller groups, which would be more agile and suitable for guerilla warfare, but to no avail. On 14 November, German and Fascist forces launched a heavy attack on Monte San Martino, with overwhelming numbers (up to 2,000 men, according to some sources) and air support; after losing thirty-eight men over two days of fighting and inflicting serious losses on the attackers, including a bomber shot down and some armoured cars, Croce's heavily outnumbered and outgunned partisans were forced to abandon their positions and escape towards Switzerland, marking the end of one of the first battles of the Italian Resistance. Croce, who had been wounded in the fighting, was the last man to abandon the mountain, blowing up the fortifications before leaving.

In July 1944 Croce returned from Switzerland in order to resume his Resistance activities in Lombardy, but was captured near Sondrio after a firefight in which he was seriously wounded in an arm, which had to be amputated. He was then tortured by the SS for information, but refused to talk, only answering "My name is Italy" to the questions about his identity. He died in the Bergamo hospital on 24 July 1944 due to the results of torture, and was posthumously awarded the Gold Medal of Military Valor.
