= Poncione dei Laghetti (Lavertezzo) =

Mountain in Switzerland

- Location within Switzerland

Highest point
- Elevation: 2,445 m (8,022 ft)
- Prominence: 55 m (180 ft)
- Parent peak: Poncione del Vènn
- Coordinates: 46°16′10.8″N 8°54′47.7″E

Geography
- Location: Ticino, Switzerland
- Parent range: Lepontine Alps

The Poncione dei Laghetti is a mountain of the Swiss Lepontine Alps, located east of Lavertezzo in the canton of Ticino. It lies on the range between the valleys of Verzasca and Leventina.
