= Poncione di Ganna =

Mountain in Italy

Coordinates: 45°53′27″N 8°50′27″E

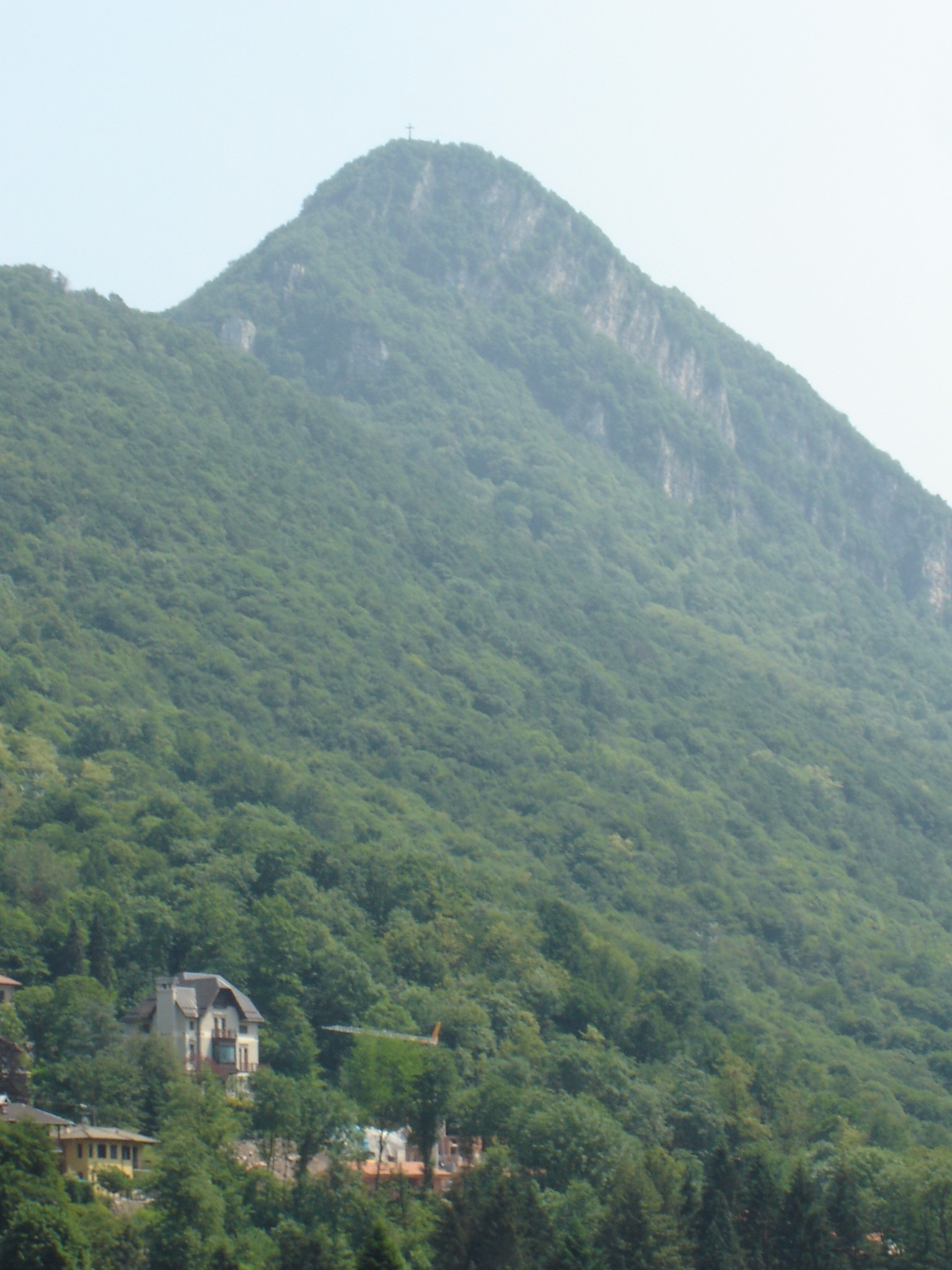

Highest point
- Elevation: 993 m (3,258 ft)
- Prominence: 86 m (282 ft)

Geography
- Location: Lombardy, Italy

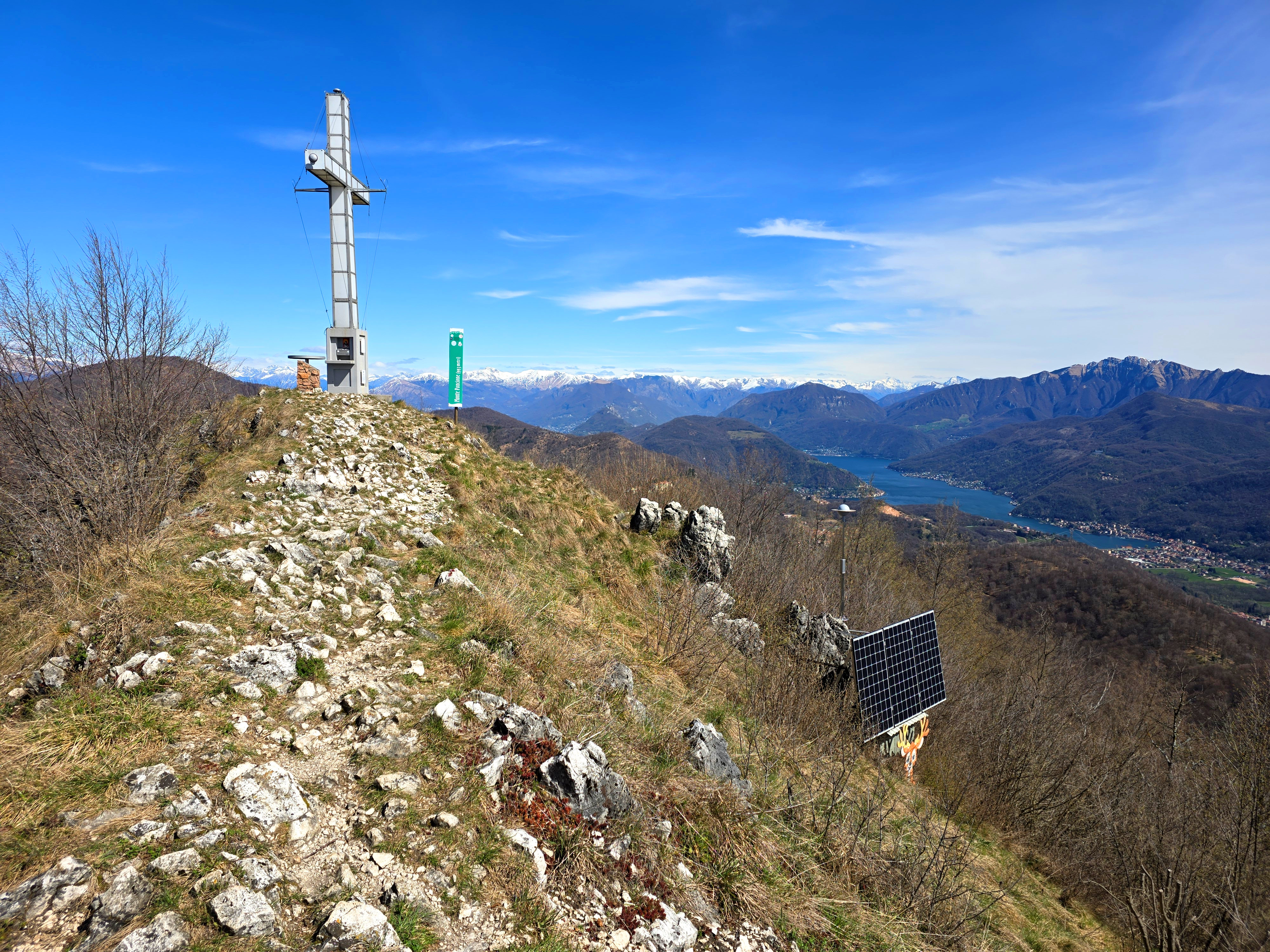
Lake Lugano, from the peak of mount Poncione di Ganna

Poncione di Ganna is a mountain of Lombardy, Italy. It has an elevation of 993 metres above sea level. It is part of the Varese Prealps subgroup of the Lugano Prealps.
