= Monte Minisfreddo =

Mountain in Italy

- Location within Italy

Highest point
- Elevation: 1,047 m (3,435 ft)
- Prominence: 252 m (827 ft)
- Coordinates: 45°52′N 8°50′E

Geography
- Location: Lombardy, Italy
- Parent range: Lugano Prealps

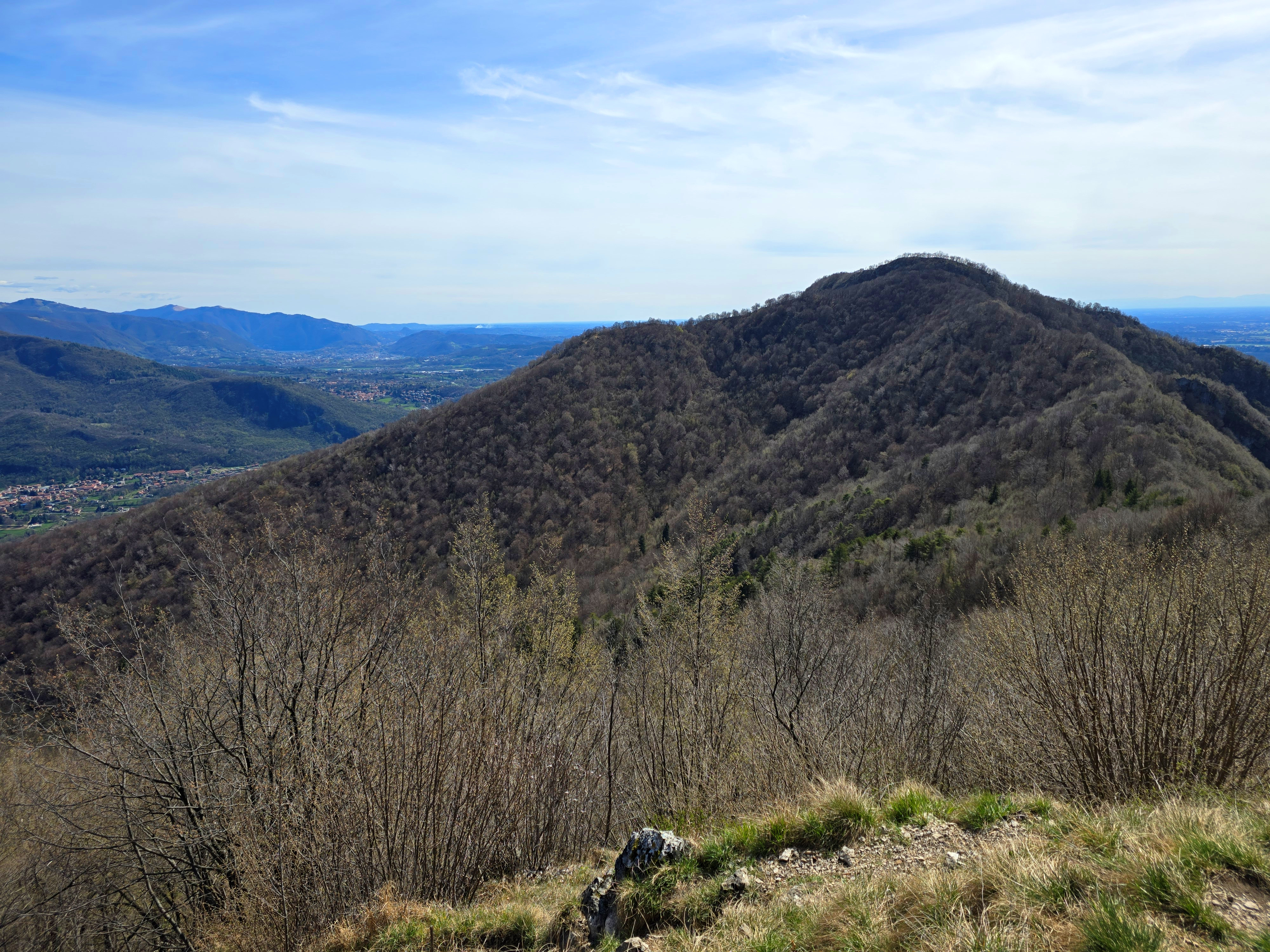
Monte Minisfreddo, from the peak of mount Poncione di Ganna

Monte Minisfreddo is a mountain of Lombardy, Italy. It has an elevation of 1,047 metres (3,435 ft). It is a popular mountain biking destination.
