= Cadorna Line =

Italian defensive system on the northern border

The Cadorna Line, officially the Northern Frontier, (Italian: Frontiera Nord) was the Italian defensive system on the northern border facing Switzerland, designed and built between 1899 and 1918. Its purpose was to protect the Po Valley and its main industrial centres from an attack by France, Germany or Austria-Hungary violating Swiss neutrality.

== Background ==
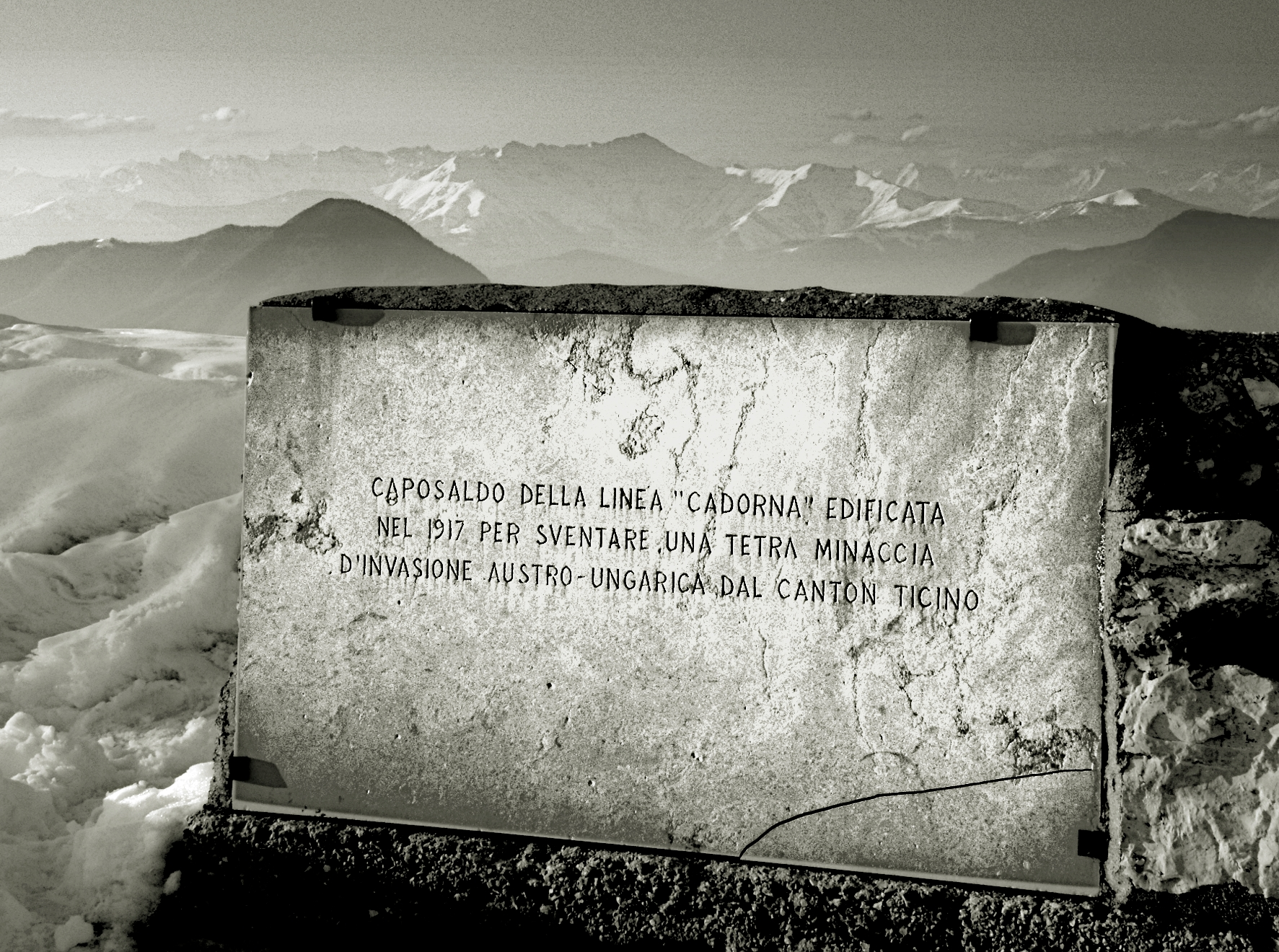
Memorial stone for the Cadorna Line on Campo dei Fiori di Varese

In 1862, shortly after the birth of the Kingdom of Italy, the Army General Staff first considered the need to fortify its borders with Switzerland to prevent an invasion through the Alpine passes - the Great St Bernard, the Simplon, the Gotthard, the Spluga, the Maloja, the Bernina, the Stelvio and the Tonale. A plan was developed to build a series of forts and batteries linking the Ossola Valley, Lake Maggiore, Ceresio and Lake Como. Because of the costs involved, the plan was not implemented for a number of years.

In 1871 a renewed effort was made to include the plan in Italy's defence budget. However, in 1882 the General Staff Committee declared its opposition to the idea, considering an Austrian violation of Swiss territory unlikely, and a German attack unrealistic. By this time the Triple Alliance had in any case neutralised these threats of invasion. Nonetheless, work on the projects resumed, and carried on haltingly until 1911, when the State Defense Office brought forward a scheme along the Bergamasque Alps and the Ticino salient.

On April 18, 1911, the General Staff entrusted the work to the Milan Military Engineering Works Management, who began work on the Mera - Adda barrier with the construction of Fort Montecchio-Lusardi. Work continued intermittently until the outbreak of the Great War and was completed urgently when hostilities began.

In September 1915, shortly after Italy entered the First World War. General it:Carlo Porro warned Chief of Staff Luigi Cadorna that an invasion of Lombardy by the Central Powers, through neutral Switzerland, could lead to an attack on the area of Milan and thus on the heartland of Italian industrial production. Apart from a few border guards Italy had only eight battalions of the Territorial Militia on this frontier. This prompted the Italian government to restart the full-scale construction of the defensive line. Cadorna therefore decided to revive the 1882 plan, and ordered the building of an imposing fortified line from the Ossola Valley up to the Bergamesque Alps. It included roads, mule tracks, paths, trenches, artillery positions, observatories, field hospitals, command centers and logistics structures, all built at high altitudes from 600 to over 2,000 meters.

The project plan provided for 72 km of trenches, 88 artillery positions (including 11 built in caves), 25,000 square meters of barracks, 296 kilometers of roads and 398 kilometers of mule tracks, at a cost of over 105m lire (about 150m euros today), requiring 40,000 men to build it. This complex of works was never used. The fortifications were garrisoned at the beginning of the war but abandoned after the defeat at Caporetto.

== The construction of the line ==
The work was contracted out to several companies, including many from Varese, which worked so well that they also obtained orders for the fortifications in the Veneto region. By the declaration of war on Germany, Italy had completed the work, and created a special Command for them. The Italian-Swiss border was divided into 6 sectors:

Val d’Aosta: The nineteenth-century Fort Bard was integrated with some positions in the Etroubles basin in order to prevent the passage from the Great St Bernard Pass, but the small likelihood of enemy maneuver in the sector limited the work.

Toce-Verbano: (Simplon Pass to Lake Maggiore) The Ornavasso barrier was strengthened by providing a final retreat line at the Candoglia quarries in order to take advantage of the natural defense offered by the mountains of the Val Grande. The barrier of the Simplon railway was not modified, because it was assumed that enemy occupation was certain. Half a 75 mm artillery battery (two guns) was assigned to the Iselle cave post, with the task of closing the tunnel in case of emergency. When the risk of invasion passed, this post remained the only one operating until the end of the war.

Verbano-Ceresio: (Luino to Porto Ceresio) the defense was built along two lines; initially it was the positions of the Varese entrenched camp that were equipped, and only later was it decided to move up to the Luino-Ponte Tresa line. This stretch of the Cadorna Line passes through the Cinque Vette Park.

Ceresio-Lario: (Viggiù to Menaggio) The importance of this area was such that all plans had, as their first objective, the occupation of the entire Mendrisio District of Switzerland up to Capolago. For this reason it was decided to concentrate fire on the Melide dam-bridge, the only means of connection with Lugano. This action would have allowed the easy occupation of Monte Generoso to protect and support the strategic point of the entire sector, the Sighignola. From Porlezza to Menaggio, the massive mountain range south of the valley offered a sufficient natural barrier.

S.Lucio-S.Jorio: The occupation of the border barracks was only planned in the event of an offensive.

Mera-Adda: This sector used the Orobie Alps as a final defensive line. The Colico barrage was considered insufficient since its location, at the level of the lake, could allow the enemy to fight back from higher ground with artillery stationed on the nearby hills. High positions were then established further up on Monte Legnoncino.

== Design and build ==
The Cadorna Line was innovative - traditional structures such as isolated garrisons, vulnerable to heavy artillery, were abandoned in favor of steel armored domes, semi-permanent field works, barbette posts for mortars, howitzers and cannons, and cave positions for machine guns and medium caliber artillery. Machine gun nests were designed to ensure coordinated covering fire.

The designers relied most heavily on trenches. These were very different to the largely improvised structures of the Western Front. The Cadorna Line trenches were designed in great detail, and equipped with parapets, loopholes and shelters.

Due to the scarcity of soldiers, the barrages were built along a rearward line that exploited the terrain following the ridges and depressions along the border. The military doctrine of the time still relied on the impact of massed troops rather than on new technologies. Thus the line was built mainly with concrete front-line trenches, accompanied by platforms and niches as vantage points for shooting.

The entrenchments were a succession of broken lines, often with sharp angles to ensure the greatest possible protection against the explosion of grenades, and at regular intervals they presented "bell" niches for the shelter of sentries in case of bad weather. Numerous tracts of trenches were equipped with small reductions, and ladders to allow the infantryman to exit in the event of a counterattack. There were also numerous machine gun positions underground.

The gun batteries in the trenches were of three types: barbettes (outdoor and semi-raised positions protected by a wall), protected concrete bunkers, and caves where large-calibre artillery were housed, with magazines and barracks for the garrison.

== The Line enters service ==
The fortified system was entrusted to the commander of the 5th Army from Varese, Lt. Gen. it:Ettore Mambretti who had the task of protecting the left flank of the Italian defensive front. Due to the lack of troops, which were almost entirely employed at the front, the posts and barriers were built in more rearward positions, in order to exploit the terrain. The 5th Army would have 4 Army Corps, (each of two divisions), two Cavalry Divisions, a division deployed in Valle d'Aosta and 56 medium-caliber batteries.

On January 16, 1917, the "Northern Frontier Advanced Occupation Command" (Italian: Comando Occupazione Avanzata Frontiera Nord (OAFN)) was established in Varese, under the 5th Army, aimed at "surveilling local conditions and studying the concrete implementation of the plans developed"; these plans provided for the border defense plan, with the support of the allied countries, as was decided during the Third Chantilly Conference in December 1916.

Three battle plans were developed by the 5th Army Command. "Plan A" was defensive and assumed French support in the Arona-Gallarate area. “Plan B” involved an offensive "leap" up to the passes of Monte Ceneri and Bernina and occupying the northern border ridges of the Adda river. “Plan C” was for an offensive to eliminate the Ticino salient in Switzerland. Following rumors that Switzerland had entered into a secret pact with Germany to attack Italy, the plans were modified to assume Switzerland was hostile rather than a neutral country that had been invaded from the north.

In the first months of 1917 the works were almost complete, but by this time their garrison troops had already been sent to Veneto together with the units of the Territorial Militia. The fortified system then passed under the control of 6 battalions of the Regia Guardia di Finanza. After Caporetto, these 6 battalions were also sent to defend the Piave line and after this the Cadorna Line remained unguarded until the end of the conflict.

General Mambretti, dismissed by Cadorna, was placed in charge of the OAFN on 20 July 1917, replacing General Lequio. The command of the 5th Army was dissolved as that of the OAFN was considered more than sufficient. In May 1918 Mambretti handed over command to General Novelli. On January 10, 1919, the OAFN was dissolved and the Cadorna Line was abandoned.

== After the First World War ==
In the thirties the Fascist regime began construction of the Alpine Wall and approved maintenance work on the Cadorna Line. The Cadorna Line was briefly the focus of attention in 1938, when Mussolini thought about invading Switzerland, perhaps to flex his muscles with the Germans who had recently annexed Austria. The "Camicie Nere Como" battalion was sent to the border, but the order was revoked and the invasion abandoned. The only war action on the line was on November 13, 1943, when the first battle of the resistance took place in the bunkers of San Martino in Valcuvia, when fascist government forces defeated a group of partisans led by Colonel Carlo Croce.

After the Second World War the works were completely abandoned, and were mostly neglected. Because of the excellent quality of their construction, many of Cadorna Line trenches and structures remain in good physical condition. The trenches of Ornavasso, Cassano Valcuvia and Monte Marzio in the province of Varese are particularly in good condition.

In the province of Como the following structures have been restored and can be visited:

- Fortino Monte Sasso (Fortino di Cavallasca)
- Monte Bisbino
- La Crocetta di Menaggio
- Cardina battery
- Cave batteries are located at Plan Puitz in Saint-Rhémy-en-Bosses in the Aosta Valley, Monte Orsa near Viggiù, at Monte Piambello, Varese and at Locco Tocco in the province of Lecco.

== See also ==
- Alpine Wall
- Austro-Hungarian fortifications on the Italian border
- Italian fortifications on the Austro-Hungarian border
