= Monte Martica =

Mountain in Italy

Coordinates: 45.8873°N 8.8162°E

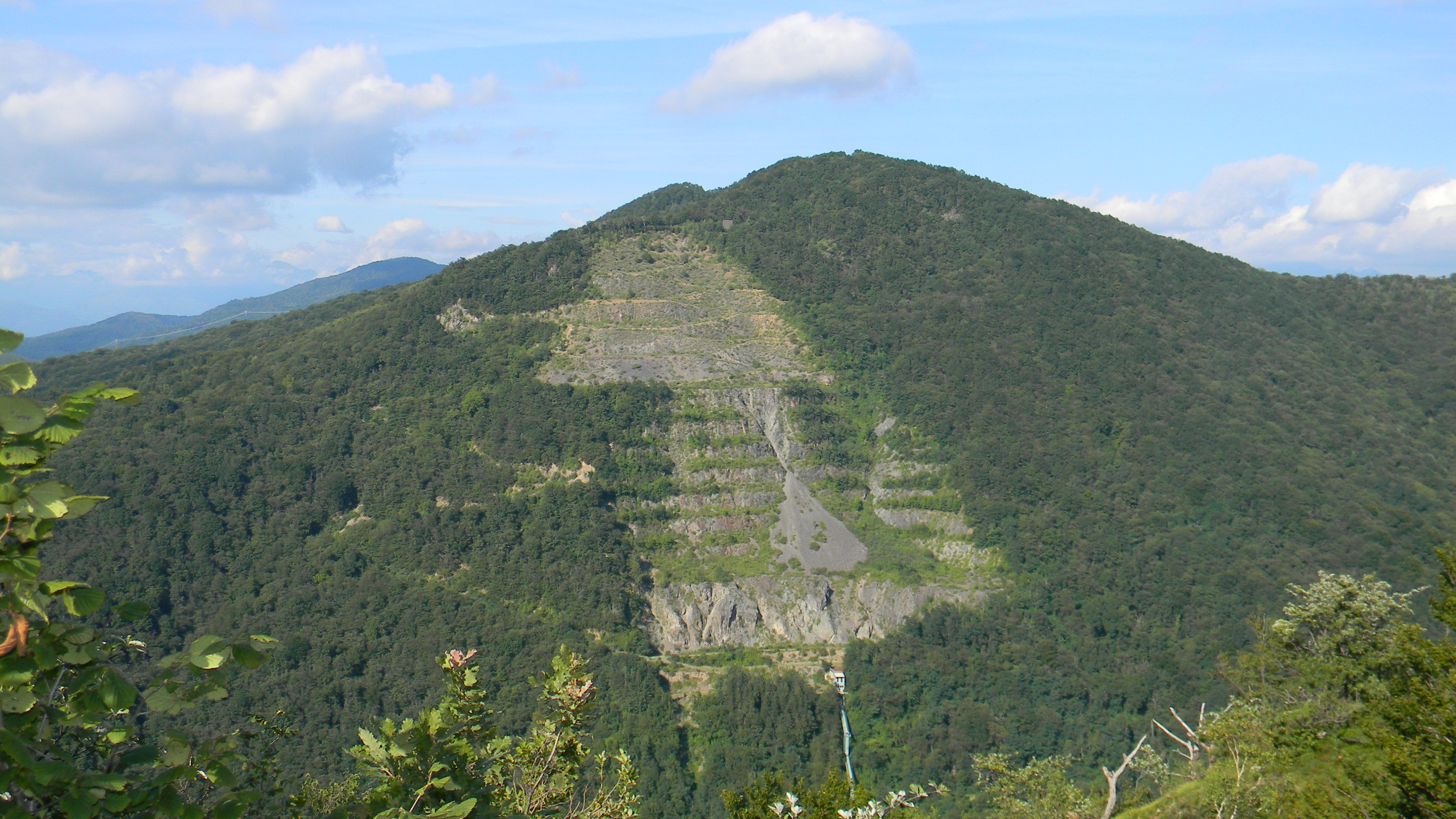
- View

Highest point
- Elevation: 1,032 m (3,386 ft)
- Prominence: 461 m (1,512 ft)

Geography
- Location: Lombardy, Italy

Monte Martica is a mountain of Lombardy, Italy. It has an elevation of 1,032 metres (3,386 ft).

The waters of Monte Martica's river were channelled, thanks to a full hydraulic engineering project by banker Giuseppe Toeplitz to aliment the water attractions that he implanted in the gardens of his monumental Villa, Villa Toeplitz.
