= Monte Monarco =

Mountain in Italy

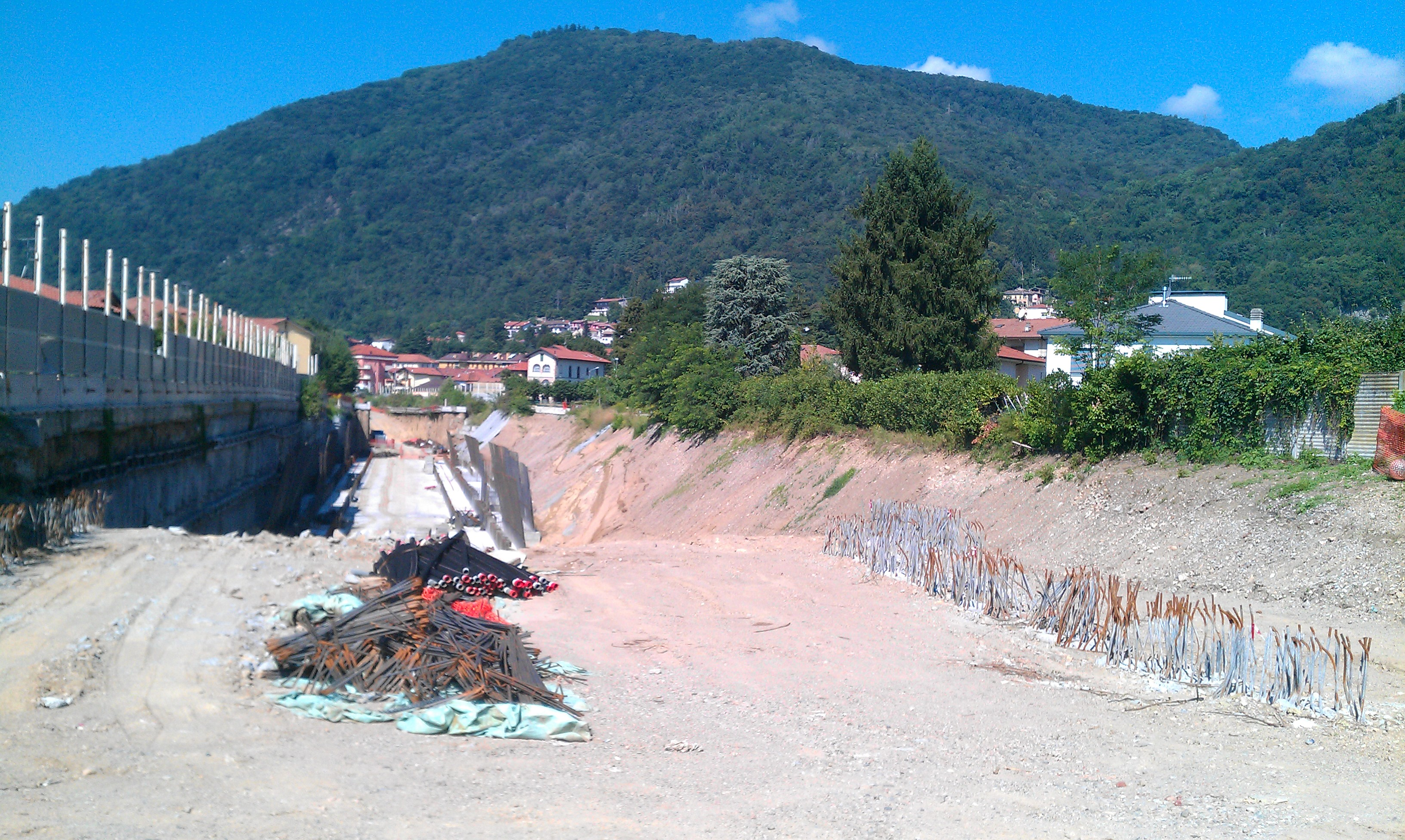
- View of the mountain from Arcisate

Highest point
- Elevation: 858 m (2,815 ft)
- Prominence: 233 m (764 ft)
- Coordinates: 45°51′46″N 8°50′28″E

Geography
- Location within Italy
- Location: Lombardy, Italy
- Parent range: Lugano Prealps

Monte Monarco is a mountain of Lombardy, Italy. It has an elevation of 858 metres (2,815 ft). It is a popular destination for mountain biking, as well as hiking.
