= Poncione d'Arzo =

Mountain in Switzerland

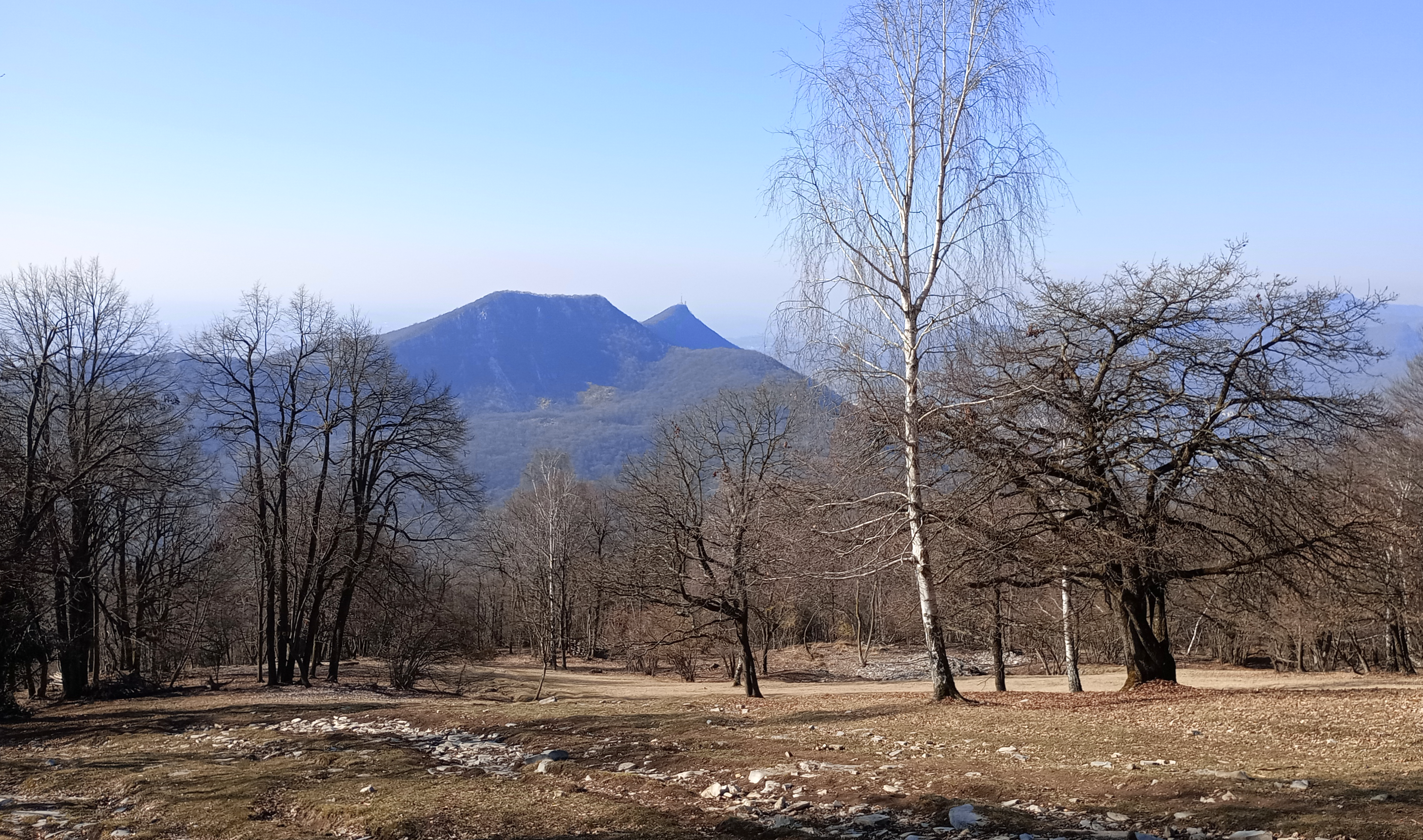
- Poncione d'Arzo, on the left, with mounts Pravello and Orsa on its right

Highest point
- Elevation: 1,015 m (3,330 ft)
- Prominence: 345 m (1,132 ft)
- Parent peak: Monte San Giorgio
- Coordinates: 45°53′32″N 8°55′38″E

Geography
- Location within Alps
- Location: Ticino, Switzerland; Lombardy, Italy
- Parent range: Lugano Prealps

The Poncione d'Arzo is a mountain of the Lugano Prealps, located on the border between Switzerland and Italy, about 250 meters east of Monte Pravello. It lies south of Lake Lugano, on the group culminating at Monte San Giorgio.
