= Monte Piambello =

Mountain in Italy

Coordinates: 45°55′21″N 8°51′07″E

Highest point
- Elevation: 1,125 m (3,691 ft)
- Prominence: 645 m (2,116 ft)

Geography
- Location: Lombardy, Italy

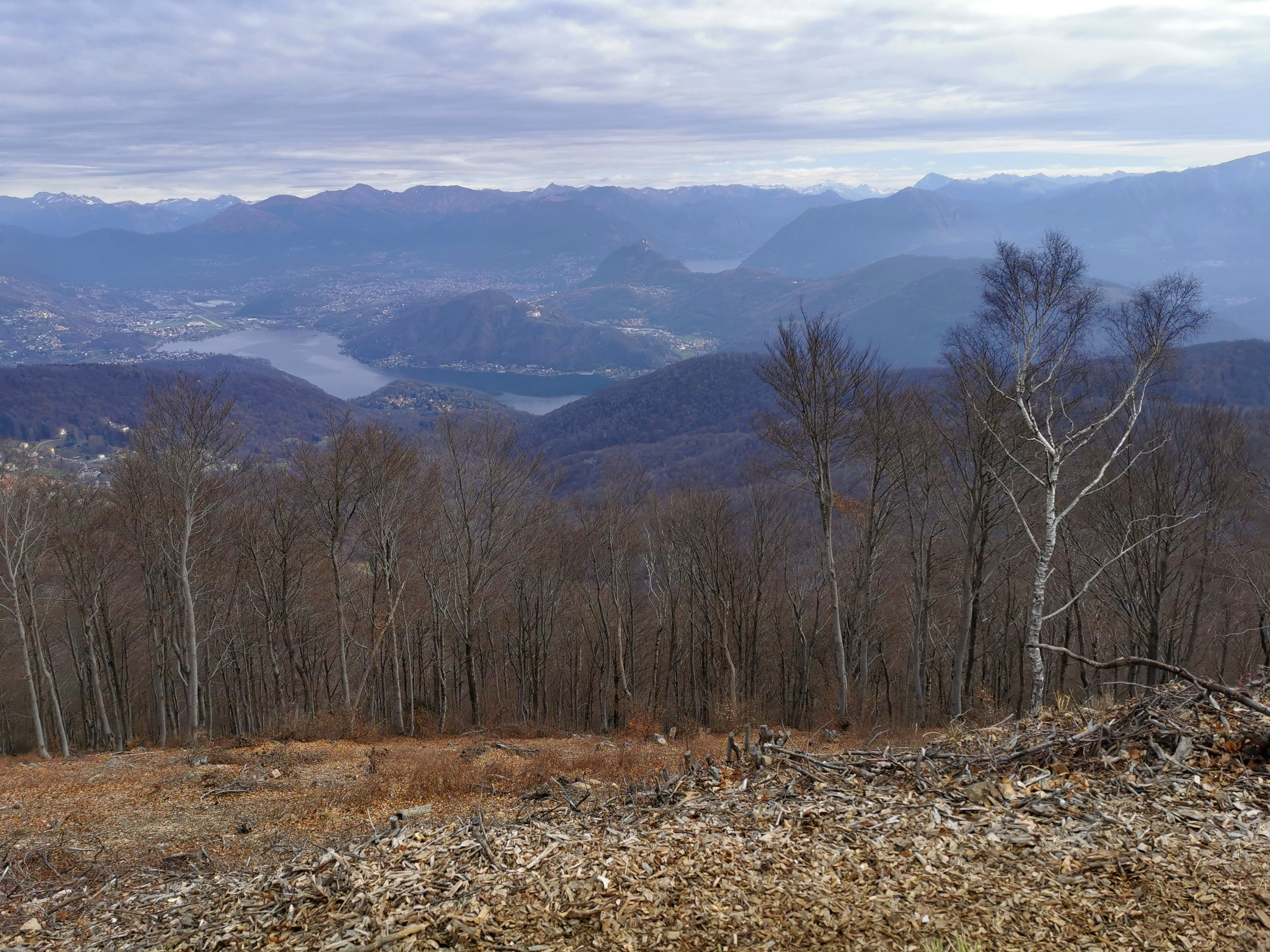
Lake Lugano from the trail to Monte Piambello

Monte Piambello is a mountain of Lombardy, Italy. It has an elevation of 1,125 metres above sea level.

Its summit is the highest point of the Cinque Vette Park
