= Boesio =

Physical characteristics
- Source
  - location: Cuveglio
  - elevation: 270 km (170 mi)
- Mouth
  - location: Lake Maggiore at Laveno-Mombello
  - coordinates: 45.9079°N 8.61694°E
  - elevation: 193 m (633 ft)
- Length: 11.6 m (38 ft)
- Basin size: 47 km^{2} (18 sq mi)
- Discharge
  - average: 1.75 m^{3}/s (62 cu ft/s)

Basin features
- Progression: Lake Maggiore

The Boesio is a river (intermittent stream) in Valcuvia, a valley in the north of the province of Varese, Lombardy, Italy. It rises near Cuveglio and flows in an east–west direction before entering Lake Maggiore at Laveno-Mombello.

The river's course takes it through the communes of Cuveglio, Cuvio, Casalzuigno, Azzio, Brenta, Gemonio, Cittiglio and Laveno-Mombello. The state road SS 394 follows in part the course of the river.

Fish found in the river include Salmonidae and Cyprinidae, in particular brown trout and vairone (Leuciscus souffia). The waters of the river are polluted.
