= Italy–Switzerland border =

International border

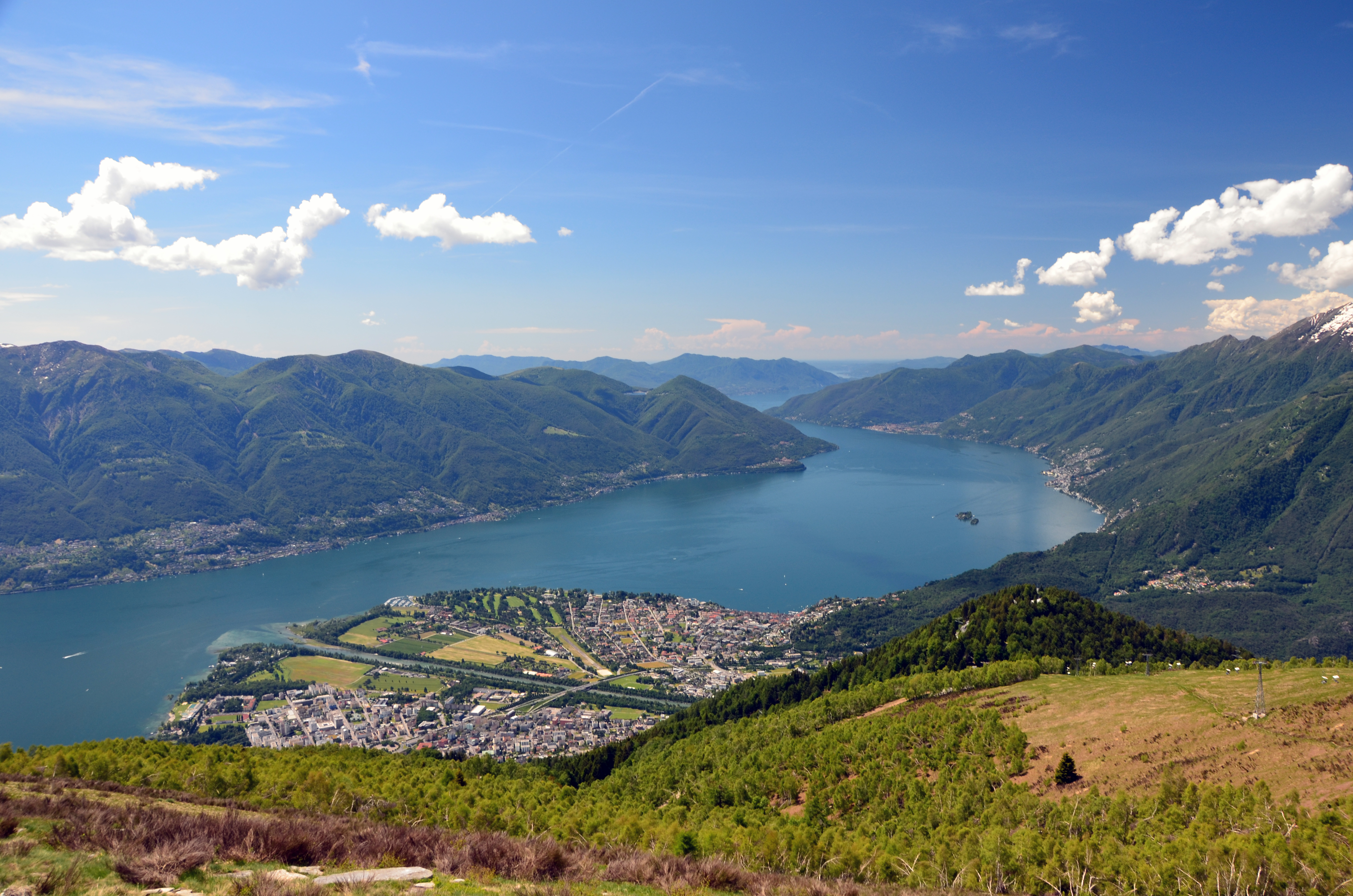
- View across Lago Maggiore towards Italy, with Ascona in the foreground, Brissago and Cannobio on the right bank and Luino in the background

Characteristics
- Entities: Italy Switzerland
- Length: 744 km (462 mi)
- Enclave and exclaves: Campione d'Italia

History
- Current shape: 1952

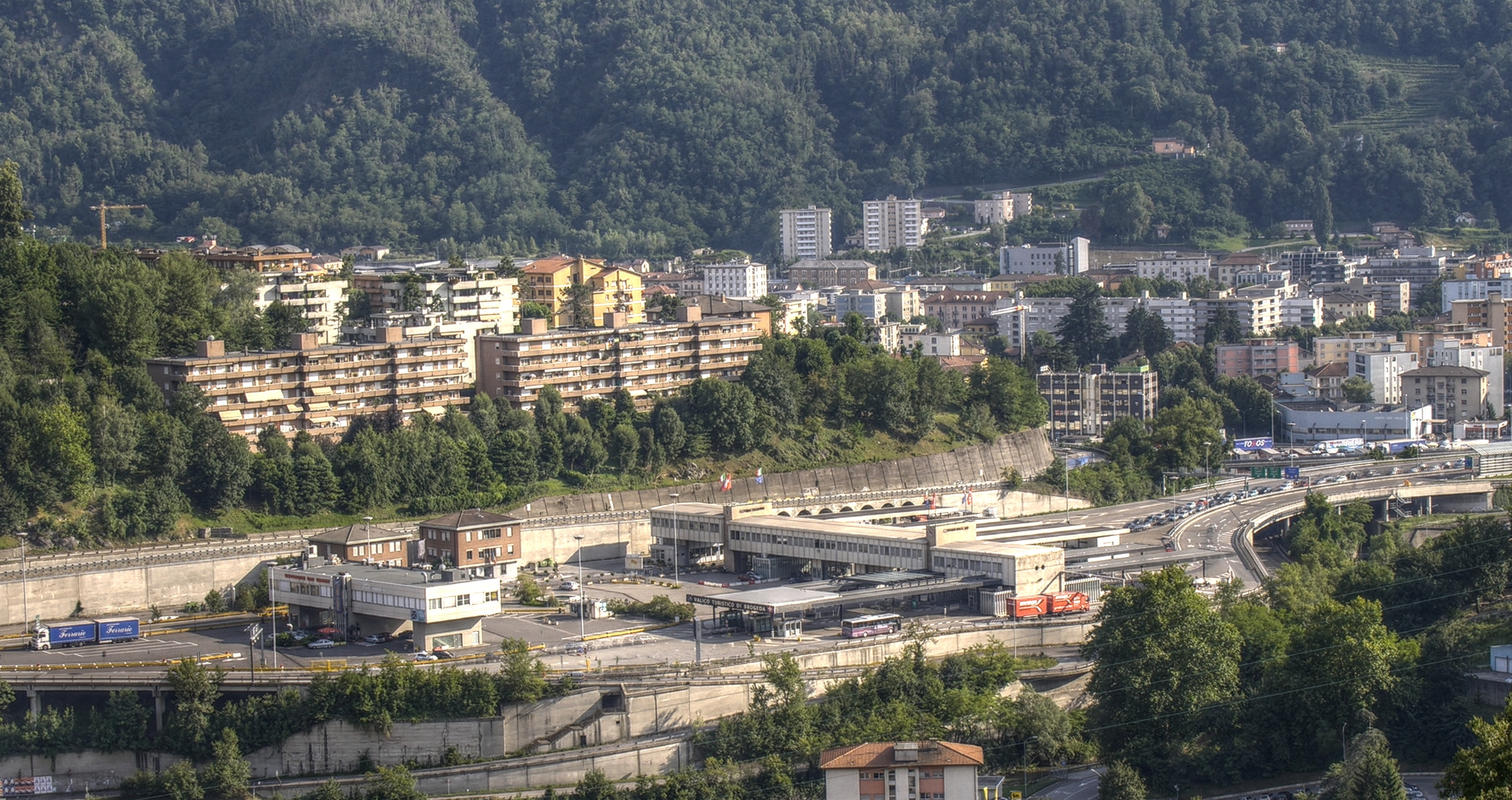
The border crossing at Chiasso

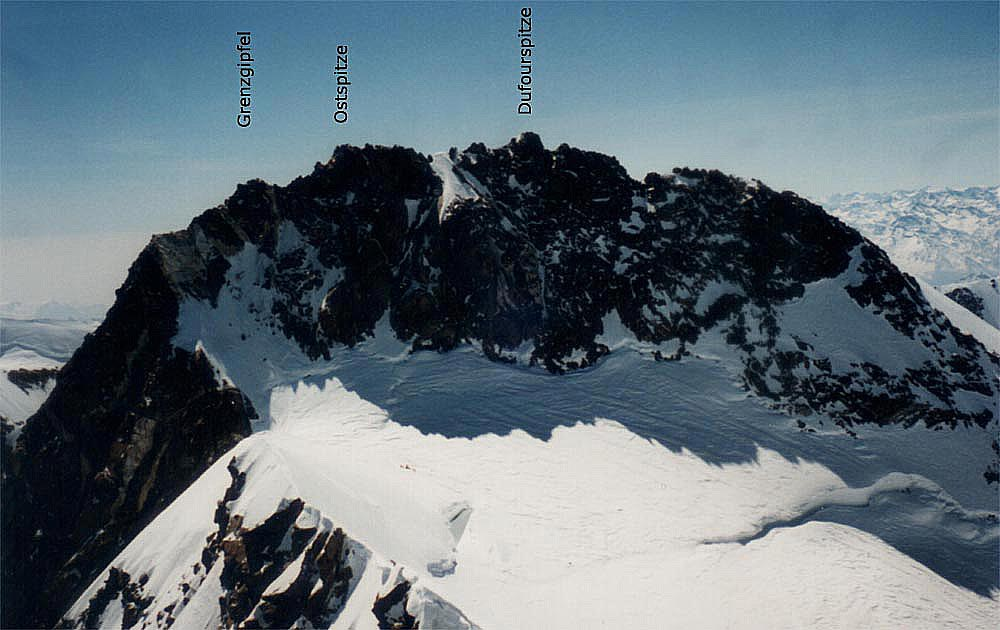
View of Grenzgipfel, the highest point of the Swiss border, just off Dufourspitze, the highest point on Swiss soil.

The border between the modern states of Switzerland and Italy extends for 744 kilometres (462 mi), from the French-Swiss-Italian tripoint at Mont Dolent in the west to the Austrian-Swiss-Italian tripoint near Piz Lad in the east. Much of the border runs across the High Alps, rising above 4,600 metres (15,100 ft) as it passes east of Dufourspitze, but it also descends to the lowest point in Switzerland as it passes Lago Maggiore at below 200 metres (660 ft).

It is the longest border of both Italy and of Switzerland.

== History ==
The border is a product of the Napoleonic period, established with the provisional constitution of the Helvetic Republic of 15 January 1798, restored in 1815. While this border existed as a border of Switzerland from 1815, there was only a unified Italian state to allow the existence of a "Swiss-Italian border" with the formation of the Kingdom of Italy in 1861, it previously comprised the borders between Switzerland and the Kingdom of Sardinia, the Kingdom of Lombardy–Venetia and the province of Cisleithania of Austria-Hungary. There remained some territorial disputes after the formation of the Kingdom of Italy, resolved in the Convenzione tra l'Italia e la Svizzera per l'accertamento della frontiera fra la Lombardia ed il Cantone dei Grigioni of 1863. Other Swiss-Italian treaties regarding the course of the border date to 1873/4, 1936/7 and 1941.

Since 1946, it has remained unchanged as the border between the Italian Republic and the Swiss Confederation, with the exception of minor corrections and exchanges of territory, such as the inclusion of the Lago di Lei barrage in Switzerland in the 1950s. In 2008 Switzerland became part of the Schengen Area, meaning that border controls were removed along this border as of 12 December 2008. However, while border guards from both countries are no longer allowed to stop travellers for the sole purpose of passport checks, they can still carry out customs checks, as Switzerland is not in the EU Customs Union.

In May 2023, a joint Italian-Swiss commission agreed to redraw a border that traverses an Alpine peak as melting glaciers shift the historically defined frontier. Switzerland officially approved the treaty in September 2024, but Italy still needs to sign.

== Detailed path ==
The border as shown by Swisstopo separates the Swiss canton of Valais from the Italian Aosta Valley and Piedmont region, the canton of Ticino from Piedmont and Lombardy, and the canton of Grisons from Lombardy and South Tyrol. Running east from Mont Dolent, the border touches Grand Golliat and the Great St Bernard Pass and then visits a series of three-thousander peaks including Mont Velan, Mont Brulé and Tête Blanche before rising to 4,171 metres (13,684 ft) at Dent d'Herens and to 4,476 metres (14,685 ft) at Matterhorn, followed by Furgghorn, Breithorn, Zwillinge, Monte Rosa at 4,554 metres (14,941 ft), and Grenzgipfel just east of Dufourspitze at 4,618 metres (15,151 ft).

The border now encircles the Italian Domodossola valley, passing Gonda, Monte Leone, Bortelhorn, Helsenhorn, traversed by the Simplon Tunnel connecting Brig with Varzo, Grieshorn just south of Nufenen Pass, and forming the western border of Ticino runs across Marchhorn, Basodino, Pizzo Fiorera, Wandfluhhorn, Pizzo Quadro, Pizzo di Porcaresc, Pilone and descends below 1,000 metres (3,300 ft) running across Centovalli along a stretch of the Melezza.

It rises again to Pilone peak before descending to Lago Maggiore between Brissago and Cannobio, on the left bank making landfall at Caviano and passing west of Lugano and the villages of Malcantone to Ponte Tresa at Lake Lugano.

It then forms the southernmost corner of Switzerland including Chiasso, turning north again outside of Como and now forming the eastern border of Ticino running west of Lake Como, of passing Lake Lugano again east of Lugano and touching Monte Boglia, Cima di Fojorina, Gazzirola, Cima di Cugn, Pizzo Campanile, again reaching 3,000 metres (9,800 ft) at Pizzo Quadro between Val Mesolcina and Chiavenna, and further north to Pizzo Tambo, Splügen Pass and Piz Timun.

The Swiss-Italian border here has the peculiarity of including the reservoir of Lago di Lei in Italy but in an artificial salient including the reservoir's dam in Switzerland. Turning south again it traverses Val Bregaglia at Castasegna and turns east towards Cima di Castello, now forming the northern border of the Valtellina, a territory that was lost by the Three Leagues in 1797 with the formation of the Cisalpine Republic.

Val Poschiavo remains part of Grisons, and is separated from Valtellina by the border passing just north of Tirano, turning north again along Piz Paradisin, Munt Cotschen, Piz da l'Acqua to the inclusion of Livigno in Italy.

The border now follows the southern watershed of Val Müstair, touching Piz Murtaröl, Piz Tea Fondada, Piz Schumbraida, Piz Umbrail until it reaches the pass road connecting Vinschgau with the Valtellina and Stilfserjoch. The border now turns north for a final stretch separating Val Müstair and the Engadin from Vinschgau, South Tyrol, terminating at the Austrian-Swiss-Italian tripoint just north of Piz Lad.

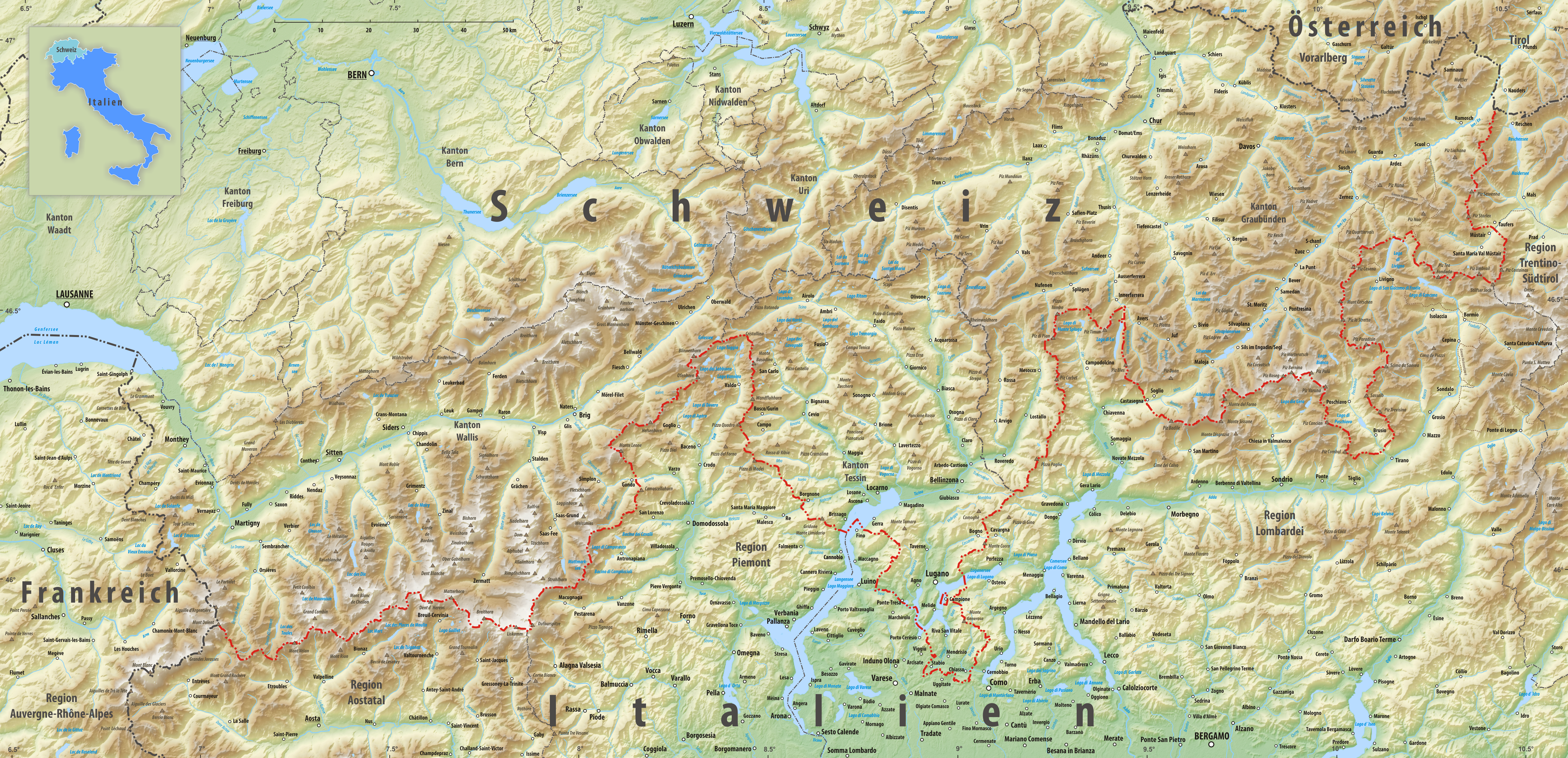
Swiss–Italian border

=== Campione d'Italia ===
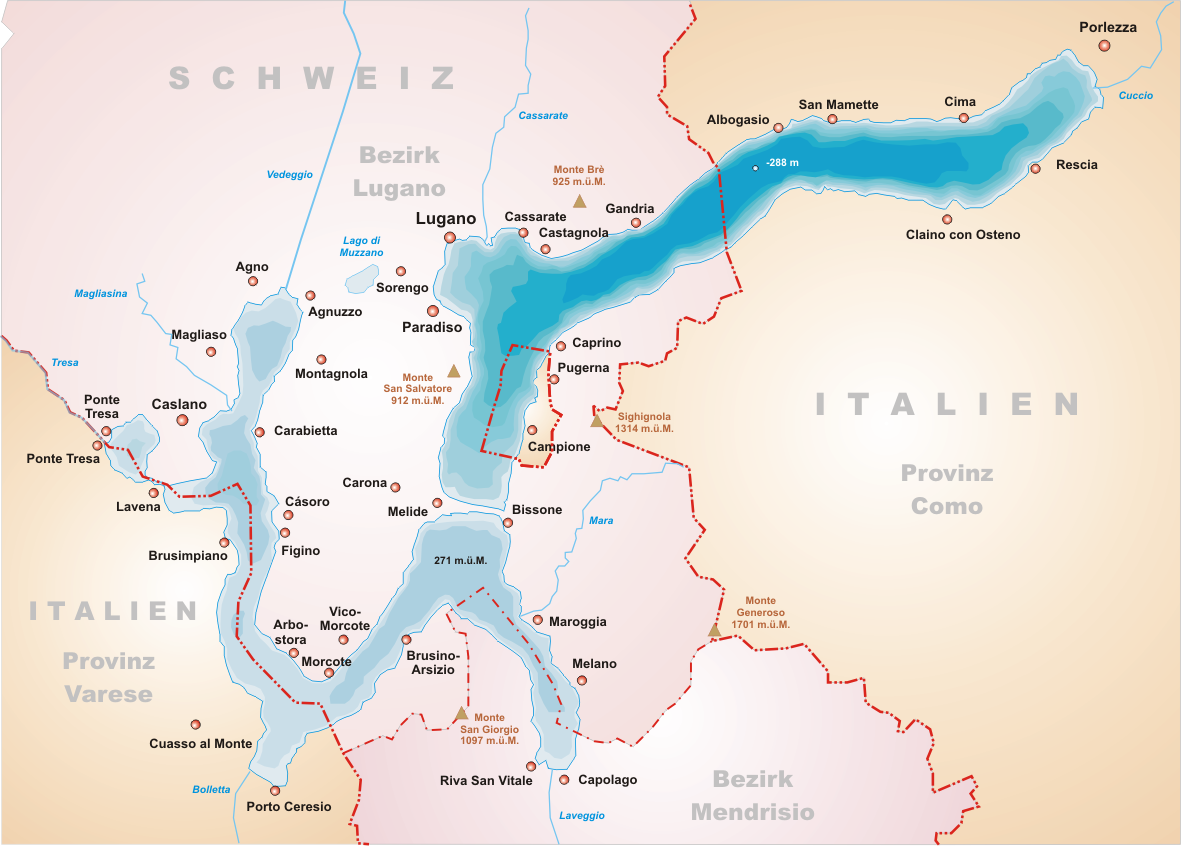
Map showing the location of the Campione enclave near the centre.

Campione d'Italia is a comune of the Province of Como in the Lombardy region of Italy and an exclave surrounded by the Swiss canton of Ticino. At its closest, the exclave is less than one kilometre (0.6 mi) from the rest of Italy, but the intervening mountainous terrain requires a journey by road of over 14 km (9 mi) to reach the nearest Italian town, Lanzo d'Intelvi, and over 28 km (17 mi) to reach the city of Como.

The entire territory of the Italian village was de facto included in the Swiss Customs Area as per a unilateral decision by the Swiss authorities. Being an exclave of Italy, it is not possible to reach the territory without crossing either Swiss territory or waters. On 1 January 2020, Campione and the Italian waters of Lake Lugano became part of the European Customs Union and a customs border crossing and check points were established.

== Transportation ==
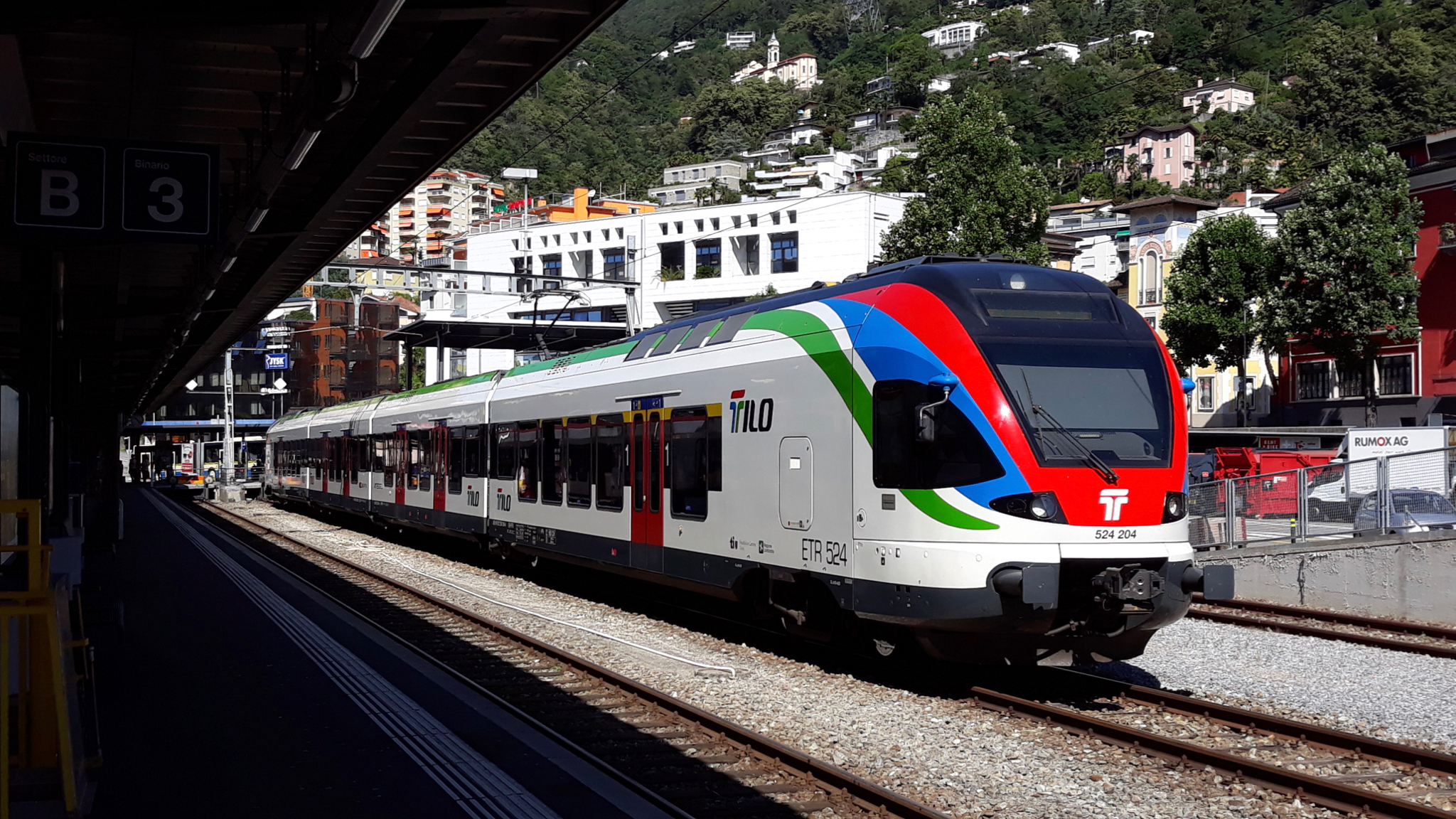
Trains of TILO operate on cross-border railway lines between the canton of Ticino, Switzerland, and Lombardy, Italy

As of the December 2023 timetable change, cross-border services between Italy and Switzerland exist on the following railway lines (from West to East):

- Simplon Railway, tunnel between Iselle di Trasquera and Brig (served by EC, RE)
- Domodossola–Locarno railway line, between Ribellasca and Camedo (served by PE, R)
- Cadenazzo–Luino railway, between Ranzo-Sant'Abbondio and Pino-Tronzano (served by S30)
- Mendrisio–Varese railway, between Arcisate and Stabio (served by S40, S50)
- Milan–Chiasso railway, between Como San Giovanni and Chiasso (served by S10, S11, S40, RE80, EC)
- Bernina railway line, between Tirano and Campocologno (served by R)

There have been plans in the past to extend the Rhaetian Railway (RhB) network from St. Moritz to Chiavenna through a tunnel under the Maloja Pass (Malojatunnel). Similarly, there have been plans to connect the Vinschgau Railway (Mals/Malles–Meran/Merano) in South Tyrol with the RhB network at either Zernez through a tunnel under the Ofen Pass (Ofenbergbahn) or Scuol-Tarasp via the Reschenscheideckbahn. Some of these plans are currently reconsidered for the future. Currently, connections exist through bus routes over these passes.

The highest border crossing by cable car is at Testa Grigia (3,458 m (11,345 ft)). It is also the highest Alpine crossing, culminating near the summit of the Klein Matterhorn at 3,821 m (12,536 ft) above sea level.

== Illegal immigration ==
In 2016, due to increased illegal immigration from Italy into Switzerland related to the European migrant crisis, the Swiss government cracked down on the practice, establishing more stringent controls in Swiss-bound trains and deploying helicopter and drone patrols. The government rejected calls to build a fence along the border. In April 2017, the Italian foreign ministry called the Swiss ambassador for "urgent talks" after Switzerland decided to close "three minor border crossings" at night.

== See also ==
- Italy–Switzerland relations
