= Castello di Lugano =

Demolished Sforza-era fortress in Lugano, Switzerland

- Castello di Lugano
- Part of Border defenses of the Duchy of Milan
- Lugano, Ticino, Switzerland
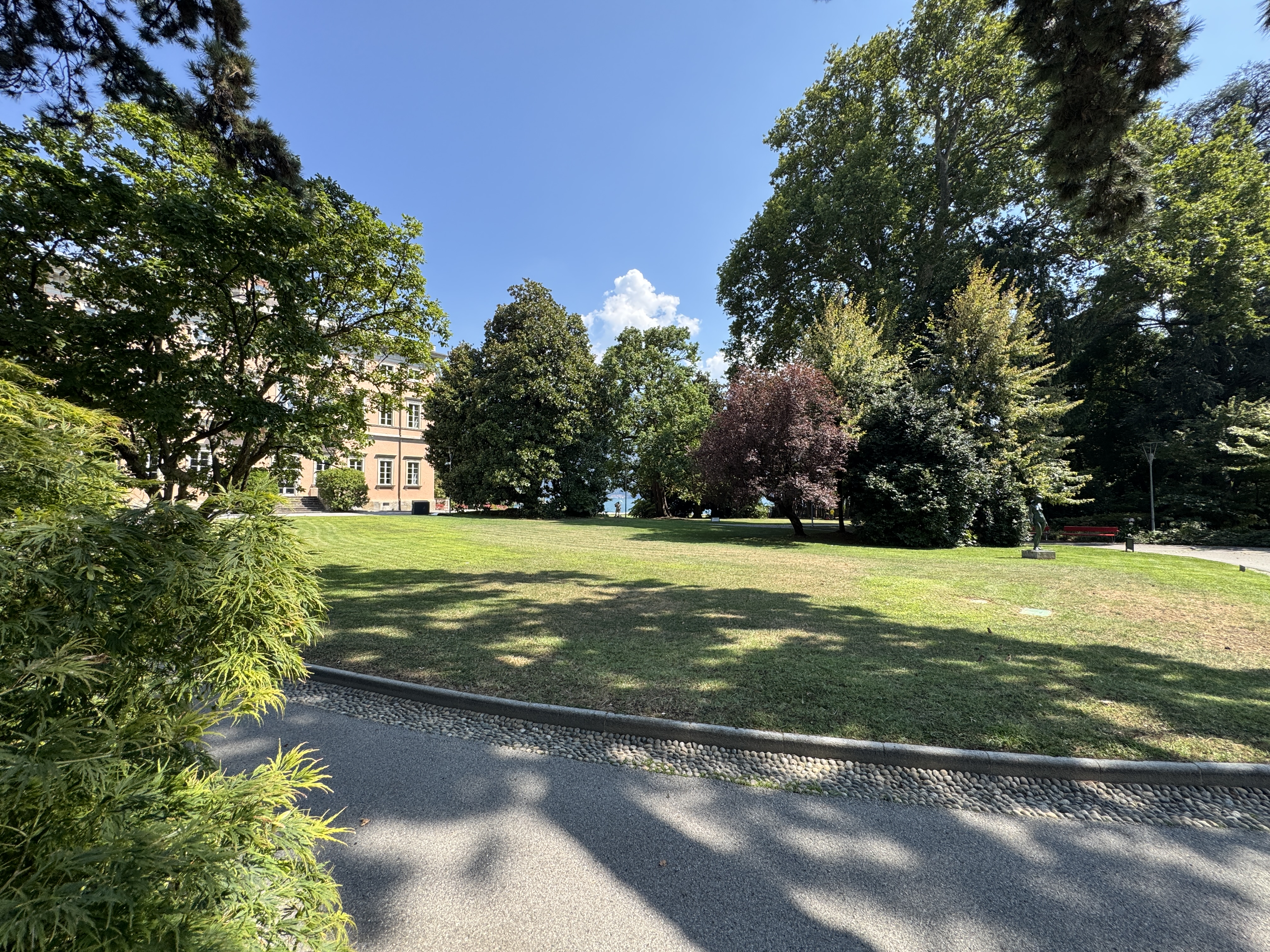
- Area of modern-day Parco Ciani, which occupies the site where the 15th-century fortress once stood

Site information
- Type: Quadrangular fortress
- Open to the public: No (site occupied by Parco Ciani and the Palazzo dei Congressi)
- Condition: Destroyed; buried foundations survive

Location
- Coordinates: 46°0′16.14″N 8°57′21.28″E

Site history
- Built: c. 1497–1499
- Built by: Ludovico Sforza (Ludovico il Moro), Duke of Milan
- Materials: Stone on timber piles
- Demolished: 8 June 1517
- Battles/wars: Old Swiss Confederacy sieges of 1501 and 1512–1513 (Italian Wars)

The Castello di Lugano (also referred to as the Castello Maggiore or the Castello sforzesco di Lugano) was a fortress in Lugano, in what is now the Swiss canton of Ticino. It was erected between 1497 and 1499 on the plain of the Cassarate, outside the walls of the then-Milanese borough, on the orders of Ludovico Sforza, Duke of Milan. Twice besieged by the forces of the Old Swiss Confederacy, it was captured in 1512–1513 and demolition began in 1517 on their orders.

The castle stood for roughly two decades. Nothing of it is visible today: its site is occupied by Parco Ciani, Villa Ciani and the Palazzo dei Congressi, and its memory survives chiefly in the toponym Piazza Castello. Buried masonry was recorded during construction work in 1918 and again during the excavations for the Palazzo dei Congressi around 1970.

== Background ==
Lugano sat on the contested frontier between Como and Milan, and repeatedly changed hands during the conflicts between Guelphs and Ghibellines in the 14th and 15th centuries.

According to Ticino medievale: Storia di una terra lombarda by Giulio Vismara, Adriano Cavanna and Paolo Vismara, an early fortification was completed in 1286 by the Rusca family of Como, and became the seat of a podestà. By the end of the 15th century it had been disused, and the Castello di Lugano was built nearby to replace it.

== Construction ==
In 1497 Ludovico Sforza ordered Enea Crivelli (brother of Francesco Crivelli, castellan of Morcote and Capolago) to build a castle in Lugano. The City of Lugano's historical archive dates the construction itself to between 1498 and 1499. The castle stood in present-day Parco Ciani in the place of Villa Ciani and the Palazzo dei Congressi.

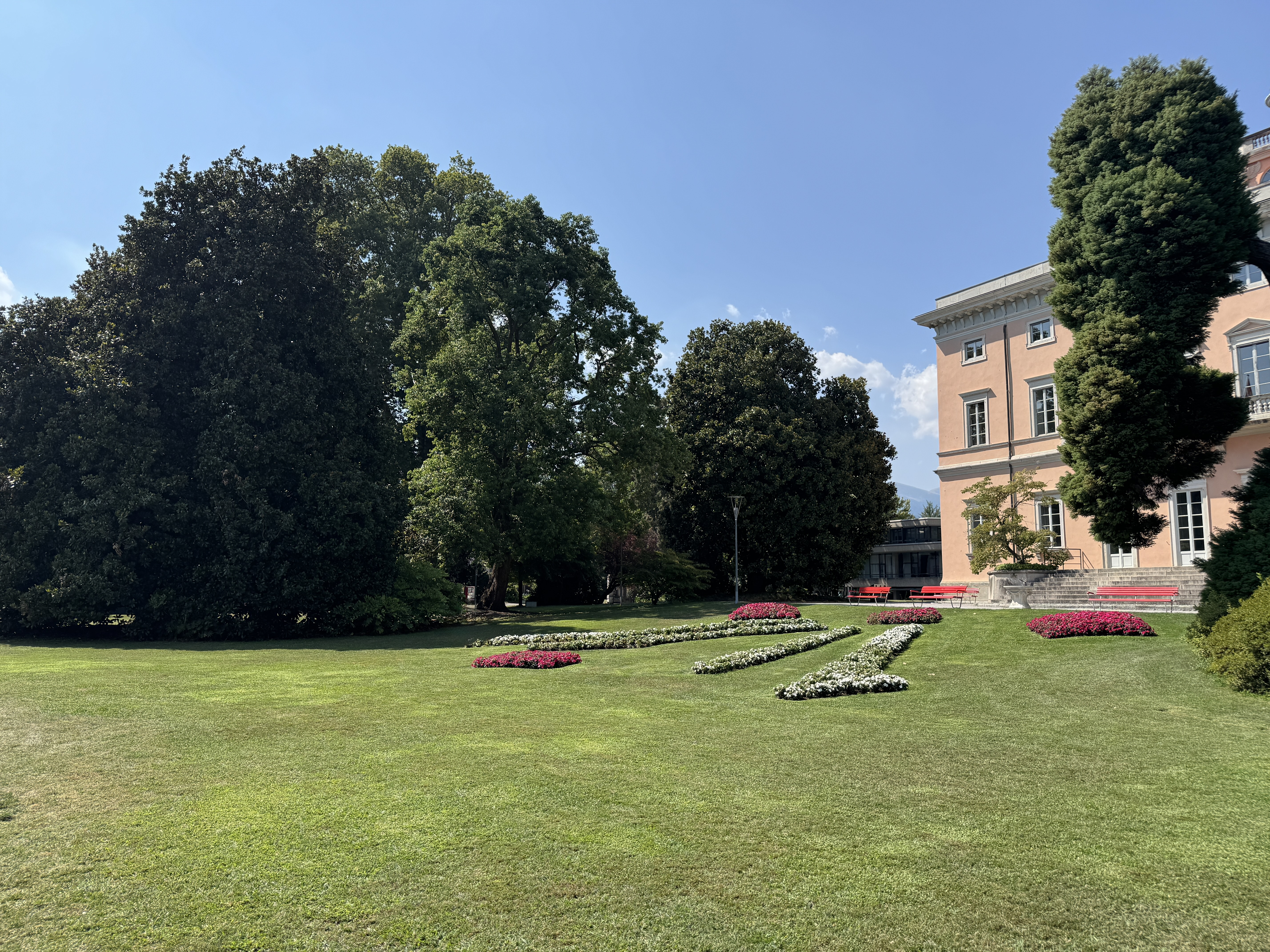
Looking towards location of XVI Century Castello di Lugano in Parco Ciani, Lugano

== Description ==
The historical archive of Lugano has no image or painting of the castle; its appearance has been reconstructed from excavated remains, limited documentation, and by comparing other Sforza works. Historian Marino Viganò, who directed the reconstruction commissioned by the City of Lugano, based it on the few surviving documents, on the round tower and stretches of wall briefly exposed during the 1970–73 excavations for the Palazzo dei Congressi, and on an inferred resemblance to the Rocca nuova of Vigevano of 1496–97.

The fortress was rectangular, with four corner towers, and covered at least 3,000 m², its longest side measuring about seventy meters. It was equipped with a ditch and a connection to the lake. The large circular tower found beneath the present Palazzo dei Congressi spanned twelve meters in diameter and was raised on piles driven into the marshy ground, the same technique used in the construction of Venice.

== French period and sieges ==
In the summer of 1499, Louis XII of France conquered the Duchy of Milan, and the borough of Lugano, along with its new castle fell under French control barely a year after the castle's construction. The Old Swiss Confederacy besieged the castle in 1501.

The Confederacy continued to push southward and entered Milan in 1512 where it became a sort of Swiss protectorate; the French withdrew from the area but left garrisons holding out in a few northern strongholds including the Castello di Lugano and Locarno, whose commanders refused to surrender.

From 23 July 1512 to 26 January 1513, the Confederacy laid a second siege on the castle. Chronicles of the siege record several episodes. A besieged man was sent to ask for reinforcements from the French garrison in Locarno, and was pursued in a horse chase by the Swiss and captured in Taverne after a last-ditch duel. The Swiss found a note in his pocket, which invited the captain of Locarno to light two fires on Monte Tamaro if he could send reinforcements, four if not. The message never reached Locarno, but to wear down French morale, the Swiss lit four bonfires. Another story recounts that local doctor Nicolò Maria Laghi was lured into the castle and forced to treat the French wounded for the entire duration of the siege.

According to the Historical Dictionary of Switzerland, the Confederacy occupied Lugano permanently in 1512, obtaining from Duke Massimiliano Sforza recognition of their conquest of the town and the valley; the last French contingents left at the beginning of 1513.

== Demolition ==
After the military defeat at Marignano in 1515 and the Treaty of Fribourg of 1516, the Confederacy sought to consolidate its hold on the territories that would become Ticino. The Confederacy effectively demilitarized the Sottoceneri region and razed the Castello di Lugano and most other fortifications (including those in Sonvico, Taverne, Bironico and Mezzovico). This was because though the Confederacy's forces excelled in open field tactics, these capabilities were ill-suited for conducting sieges; fearing these defensive structures would be recaptured by their enemies, it was more prudent to destroy them.

Acting on Confederate orders, the communities of Lugano began to pull the castle down in 1517, RSI dating the start of the demolition to 8 June.

== The site after 1517 ==
Around 1526 the land passed to the Community of Lugano and was used for activities that had to remain outside the inhabited center. In the next century it would host a "lazaretto" with six cells, an inn for quarantines, and the executioner's residence.

The area where the castle stood was called Piazza Castello and served as the site of the town fair for centuries. In 1898 the area was renamed Piazza dell’Indipendenza (Independence Square) after an obelisk commemorating independence was erected there; in 1942 the name Piazza Castello was reassigned to what is now the area at the entrance of the Palazzo dei Congressi, adjacent to Piazza dell’Indipendenza.

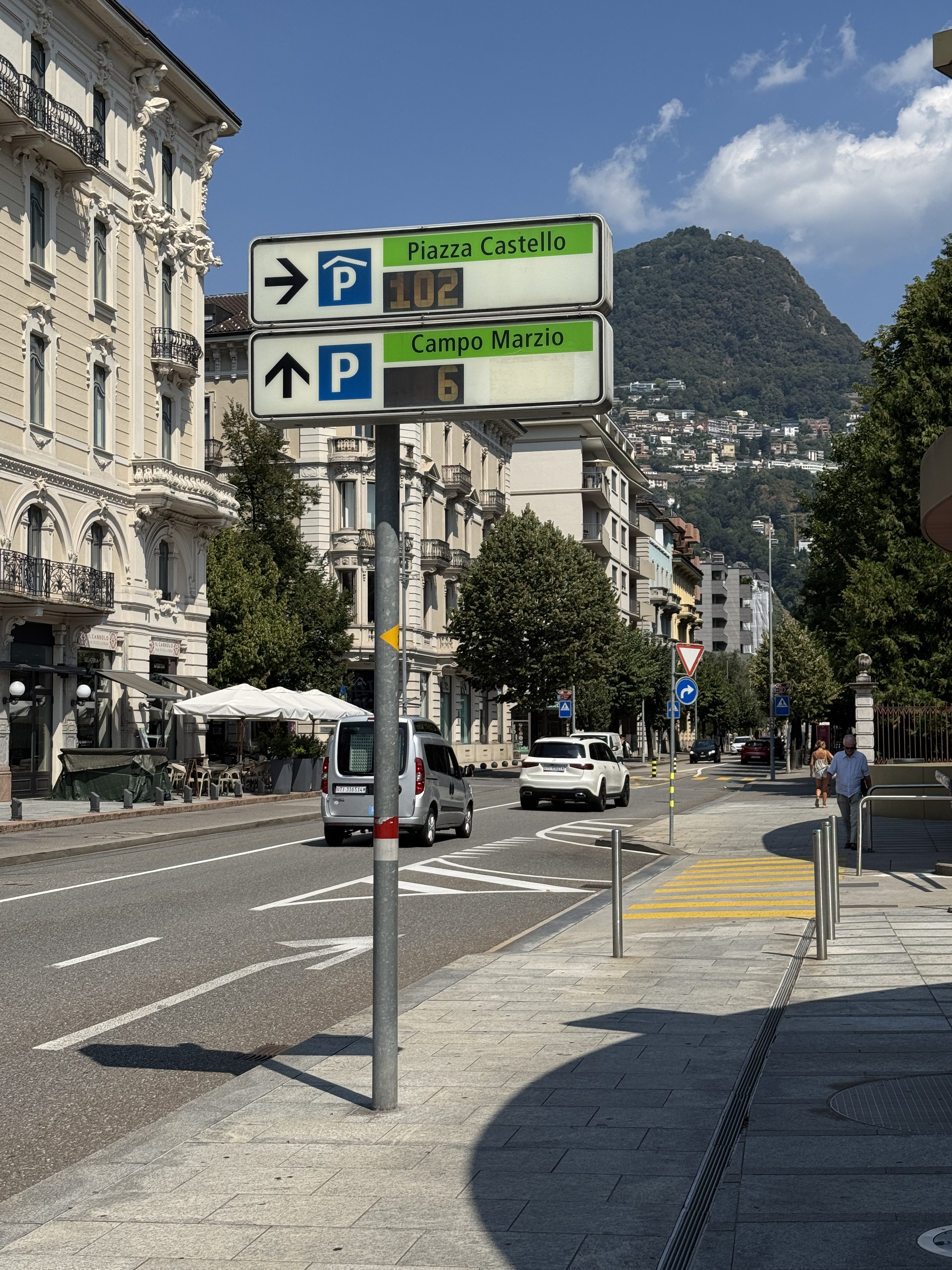
Modern traffic signage for Piazza Castello in Lugano

== Archaeology ==
The first remains (two stretches of massive masonry) were discovered in 1918 during construction of a sewer. During the construction of the Palazzo dei Congressi in 1970, the remains of a round and a square tower were found. The circular tower still lies beneath the Palazzo dei Congressi.

== Dating ==
Published dates for the castle's foundation vary. A 2021 RSI radio feature, produced with historical consultancy from the City of Lugano's archive, places Ludovico Sforza's order to Enea Crivelli in 1497; the City's heritage service dates the construction to 1498–1499; the Corriere del Ticino gives 1498.

== Legacy ==
The castle was the subject of the biennial research project Lugano nel Rinascimento (Lugano in the Renaissance), launched by the City of Lugano's Culture Division in 2021. An open-air exhibition, Sai che a Lugano c'era un castello? ("Did you know that in Lugano there was a Castle?"), was shown on the Riva Caccia lakefront from 15 December 2021 to 1 February 2022. The volume Lugano francese (1499–1512), edited by Roberta Ramella and Marino Viganò for the series "Pagine Storiche Luganesi" in collaboration with the cantonal Office of Cultural Heritage, was presented at the LAC on 15 December 2021. Illustrator Simone Boni produced a reconstruction of the castle under siege based on the archaeological evidence.

In connection with the exhibition, RSI produced a radio drama, Quasi una ballata – ovvero cronache del castello di Lugano ("Almost a Ballad – or Chronicles of the Lugano Castle"), with historical consultancy by Pietro Montorfani and Marino Viganò.

== See also ==
- Castles of Bellinzona
- Visconti Castle (Locarno)
- History of Ticino
- Italian Wars
