= Martschenspitz =

Mountain in Switzerland

- Pizzo Stella
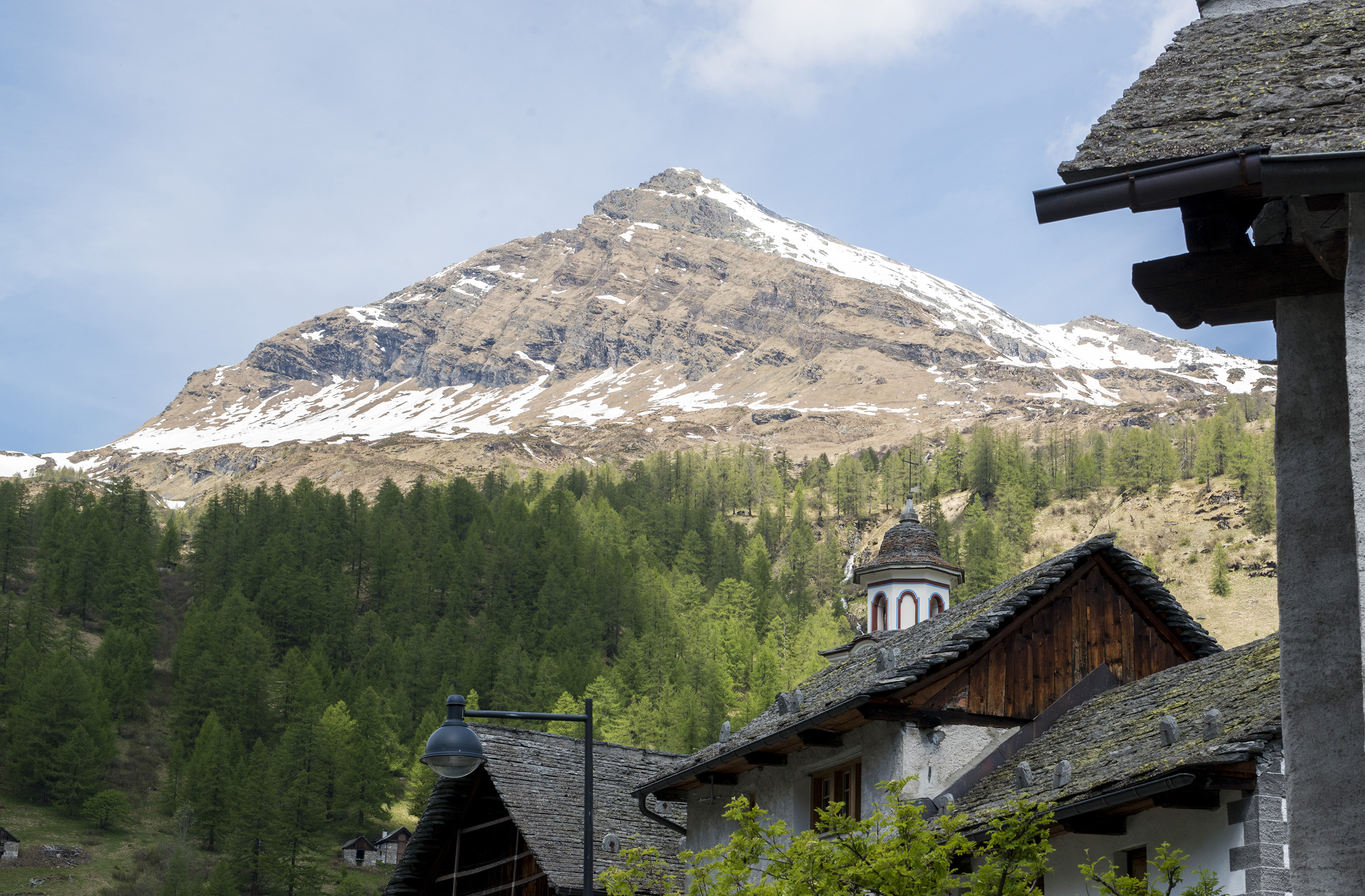
- Martschenspitz from Bosco/Gurin

Highest point
- Elevation: 2,688 m (8,819 ft)
- Prominence: 269 m (883 ft)
- Parent peak: Wandfluhhorn
- Coordinates: 46°19′41.6″N 08°27′36″E

Geography
- Location within Alps
- Location: Ticino, Switzerland; Piedmont, Italy
- Parent range: Lepontine Alps

The Martschenspitz (also known as Pizzo Stella) is a mountain of the Lepontine Alps on the border between Switzerland and Italy. On its southern side it overlooks the pass Guriner Furggu. The closest locality is Bosco/Gurin in Ticino. Its summit is 2688m high, and is popular with mountain climbers.
