= Monte Bar =

Mountain in Switzerland

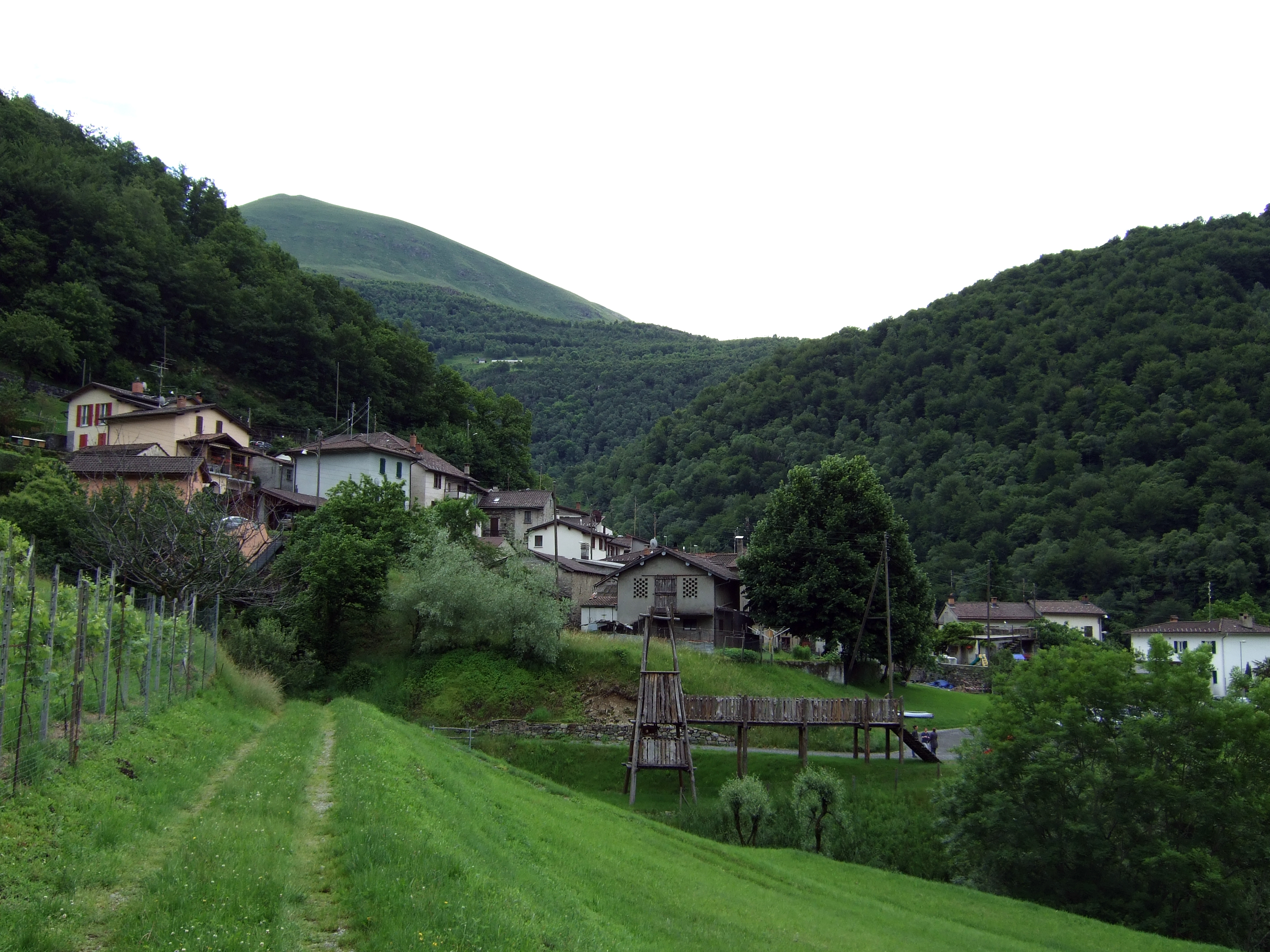
- Mount Bar (left-center background), (Medeglia foreground)

Highest point
- Elevation: 1,816 m (5,958 ft)
- Prominence: 186 m (610 ft)
- Coordinates: 46°06′28″N 9°00′42.5″E

Geography
- Location within Switzerland
- Location: Ticino, Switzerland
- Parent range: Lugano Prealps

Monte Bar is a mountain of the Lugano Prealps, located north of Lugano in the canton of Ticino, Switzerland. It lies on the range west of the Gazzirola, between the Val d'Isone and the Val Colla.
