= Leonardo's Rivellino =

Renaissance fortification

Coordinates: 46°10′06″N 8°47′38″E

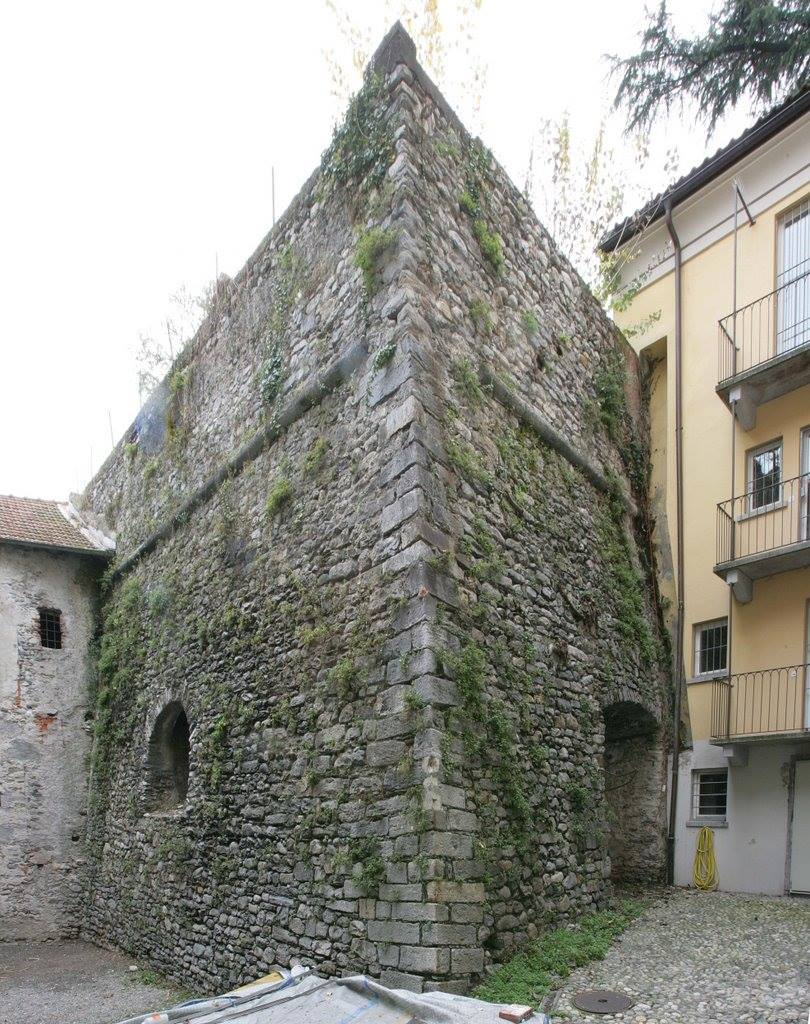
Part of the walls and the entrance to Leonardo's Rivellino seen from the courtyard

Leonardo's Rivellino is a Renaissance ravelin adjacent to the Visconti Castle in the Swiss city of Locarno. It was designed and built by Leonardo da Vinci during the period of the Milanese wars of the 16th century. This structure is possibly the only military construction by Leonardo da Vinci that has remained intact to this day without having undergone any modifications or transformations whatsoever and is being studied as an example of Renaissance war technology.

The rivellino is located northeast of the Visconti Castle, on the Via al Castello. It is mainly visible from the courtyard of the Rivellino art gallery.

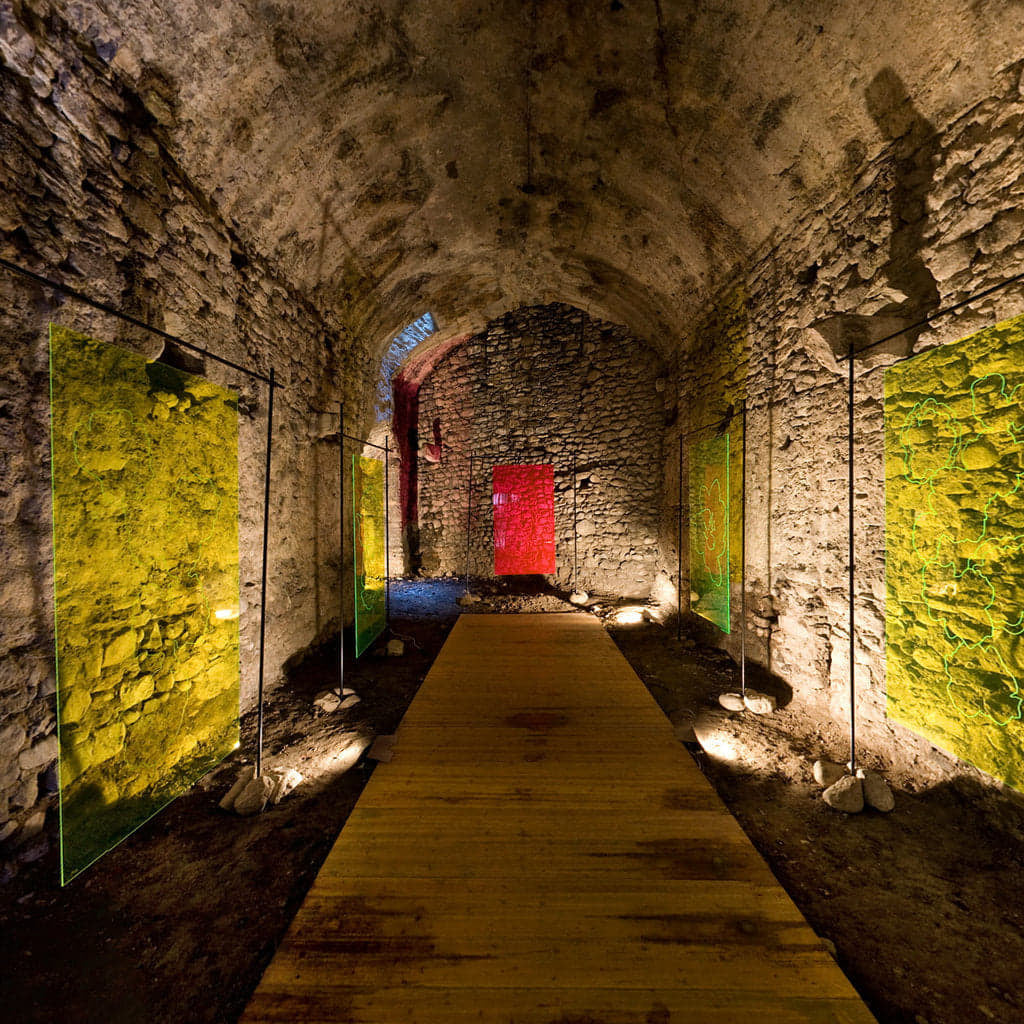
Intern - an art expo inside

== Description ==
The structure has a pentagonal plan, with walls up to 4 meters thick, slits and mouths of fire. Inside the Casemate, above the emplacements for the cannons there are the hoods for the aspiration of the fumes resulting from the gunpowder: this element may seem obvious today, but for 1507 it was the vanguard of military technology and represented the key time for the indoor use of gunpowder weapons. On the roof of the building there are the exhaust chimneys of the extractor hoods and further artillery positions.

Inside the casemate there are two main naves, which in turn lead to other smaller galleries.

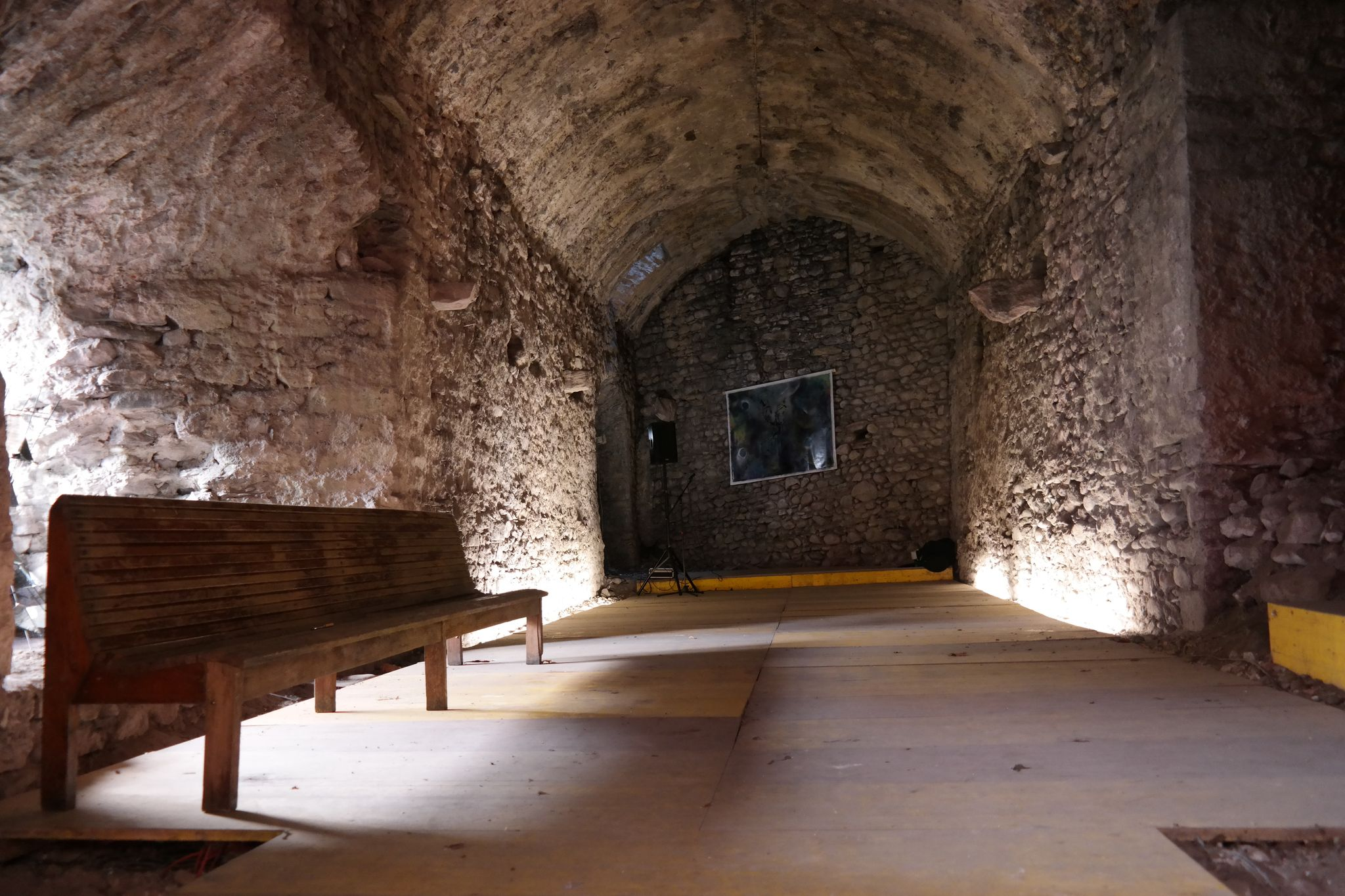

Another element is the inclination of the big walls, capable of deflecting artillery shots, and the use of the corners of the structure as reinforcement in case of attack. These characteristics were in fact an innovation on the engineering and military profile, and will remain unchanged from the theoretical and tactical point of view until the introduction of the airplanes on the battlefields, that is 400 years later.

== History ==
The Rivellino Leonardesco was erected in 1507, on the remains of a tower protecting the Visconteo Castle (Locarno) then part of the Duchy of Milan; the latter was destroyed in one of the various attacks by the Confederates against the village, who attempted the siege following the capture of Bellinzona during the period of south expansion.

=== Background ===
Following the confederate conquest of Bellinzona, the border between Switzerland and the Duchy of Milan (then under French domination following the conquest of 1499) was moved back to the city of Locarno, an important commercial hub as it arose on the shores of Lake Maggiore, part of a dense network of connections thanks to the water channels that allowed the traffic of goods within the duchy.

The protection of the ancient medieval port (demolished at the beginning of the 21st century to make room for a roundabout) was therefore peremptory, with a view to strengthening the borders of the Duchy desired by the French occupiers under the reign of Louis XII of France.

In this context the experts in the field of military technology of the time were asked, including Leonardo da Vinci, who at that time was staying in Florence, which in the meantime had become a republic.

=== Commission ===
In 1506, on the advice of Duke Charles de l'Amboise II, then lieutenant in Lombardy, King Louis XII of France asked by a missive to the then Florentine lordship to be able to employ the master Leonardo da Vinci in the important work of strengthening the borders, since the master's name was not unknown to the regent. Da Vinci, in 1502, had also designed of fortifications on behalf of the House of Borgia, in the function of "architect and general engineer". This function will be resumed within the Duchy where he will obtain employment as an ordinary engineer and painter. Also in 1506, he was finally sent to erect a fortification on the border of the Duchy, having in the meantime drawn up an outline project that still exists today, as evidenced by one of his notebooks that survived to our time.

=== Construction ===
Leonardo da Vinci personally supervised the construction, as evidenced by the travel expenses that have come to the present day, and the type of technology used that was 20 years in advance than similar constructions in the north of Italy. this type of knowledge in the peninsula had in fact been experimentally realized in southern Italy by Francesco di Giorgio Martini, who died 6 years earlier in Siena, compared to the construction mandate. Martini, about the implications of these experimental constructions, drew up a treatise on military architecture from which Leonardo drew various ideas for that kind of new type of constructions, since the Martini had already had to worry about the defense of fortifications by firearms. Vinci took particular care in positioning fire mouths adequately, reinforcing the imposing walls and avoiding possible blind spots.

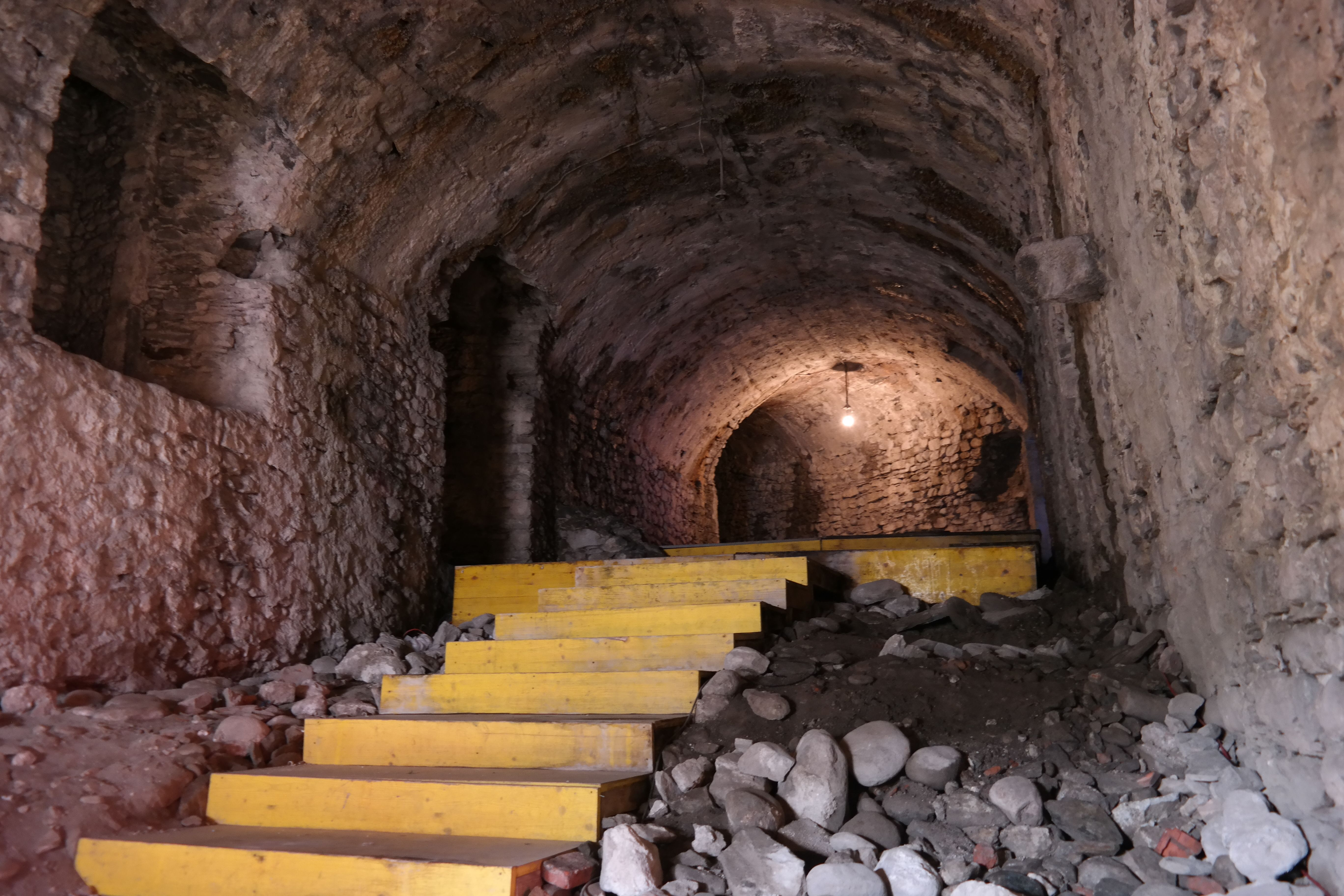

=== Confederate conquest and fall into oblivion ===
The fortification reinforcement work did not succeed in stopping the advance of the Confederates. In fact, they managed to conquer Locarno in 1513, and went on to conquer Milan.

Following the Battle of Marignano, the expansionist aims ceased by the Helvetii, becoming de facto a neutral state and roughly maintaining the boundaries that still exist today.

In 1532, the Confederates demolished a large part of the fortification, which in the meantime had become useless and expensive to maintain, leaving intact only the castle (which became the home of the Landfogto) and the ravelin, as at the time modern structure and under a technical profile, at the time 'avant-garde: it was especially useful for controlling and disadvantaging any revolts by the villagers of the Canton Locarno, the baliaggio – or occupied territory – by the old Confederation now part of the Canton Ticino:

The Abschied of 3 July 1532 (the ledger of the Confederates of Locarno) in fact reports the order to leave intact only the castle – used as a bailiff's house – and to demolish the vast majority of the fortification. The document also talks about the sale of the castle's lands to this Battista Appiani on condition that he builds a road that connects the castle to the village with a bridge over the structure called "Rafellin".

Meanwhile, within the territories of the duchy, there was an intense succession of dominations: leaving out the brief Swiss domination, after the first loss of the Duchy of Milan as French domination in 1512 and the subsequent temporary restoration of the Sforza family, Milan fell at the hands of the French. It was then captured by Charles V of Habsburg, who in 1540 appointed her son Philip II of Spain as the new Duke of Milan.

All this series of events will bring the ancient fortified border line into oblivion, never touched any more by wars, in which – among others – Leonardo's fortress was hidden.

== Rediscovery and reevaluation ==
=== Early modern studies ===
In the late 19th century, Johann Rudolf Rahn carried out the first research on medieval artistic and archaeological monuments in the Canton of Ticino, publishing his research in the book I Monumenti Artistici del Medio Evo nel Cantone Ticino [The artistic monuments of the Middle Ages in Ticino]. The volume, published in 1894, dedicates a section to the castle and village of Locarno. Rahn, on page 136 of this volume, writes:

It then appears that an underground communications system, which started from point K [referring to a diagram of Rahm's reconstruction of the castle] of the ravelin, connected the fortress with the second part of the castle. ... From here four galleries stretched like a fan, that is to say a series of undergrounds which, it is said, extends under the whole surface of the garden in front of the western front of the Rusca house and which perhaps corresponds with the tower B. This construction recalls a drawing made by Leonardo da Vinci in a manuscript of the "Bibliothèque de l'Instituit" (Ravaisson Mollien, Les manuscrits de Leonardo da Vinci B & D de la bibliothèque de l'Instituit. Paris 1883, fol. 37 recto)

The issue was not further explored by Rahn or by the then head of the department of public education, Eligio Pometta, remaining a mere curiosity.

=== Rediscovery ===
Towards the end of the 20th century, after several changes of ownership of the site, the current owners reevaluated the sector with a proposal for urban redevelopment. The current grounds, in fact, made up of houses in the historic core adjacent to the castle, allowed a better distribution of the surfaces. On the other hand, the rivellino, already for centuries stripped of its past as a military installation and used as a deposit for adjacent buildings, was now relegated to an anonymous pentagonal construction and difficult to use precisely by virtue of its obsolete shape. The solid rock construction, the remarkable arches as well as the stable temperature made the current owners understand the possibility of using this space as a cellar for fine wines. It was precisely this request for the change of destination and redevelopment that gave rise to what is probably the most relevant architectural discovery of the decade. The cantonal law, in fact, obliges the owners of grounds adjacent to architectural heritages and historical nuclei to make a brief historical research on the past of these spaces, before being able to proceed with a possible modification.

This brief research brought out the military past of the fortress, and after seven years of research, the military historian and Leonardist Marino Viganò managed to attribute the construction to the famous architect, engineer, Renaissance artist, publishing his discoveries in the volume Leonardo in Locarno.

After these aspects, the current owners of the site decided not to continue with the conversion as a winery, but rather to homage to the architectural discovery and its designer by using the Leonardo building as a contemporary art gallery, founding the Rivellino LDV gallery.

== Bibliography ==
- https://www.cdt.ch/approfondimenti/ci-voleva-un-nuovo-bastione-e-leonardo-ando-a-locarno-CC1136040
- https://www.cdt.ch/ticino/il-rivellino-si-e-di-leonardo-IQCDT9082
- Newspaper article from "Il Caffé" by E. Rocchi Balbi "Il genio di Leonardo da Vinci fortifica la Storia del Ticino"
- Historical Society of Ticino – Rivellino, Opuscolo. edito nel 2010
- Final report 09/2007 done by the University of Switzerland (USI), Academy of Architecture in Mendrisio
- Marino Viganò – Leonardo a Locarno -Documenti per una attribuzione del rivellino del castello 1507 – Collana «Itinerari» anno 2009 – pp. 456 – ISBN 9788877135117
- Marino Viganò – L'architettura militare nell'età di Leonardo ISBN 978 88 77 13 545 2
- Marino Viganò – Locarno francese (1499–1513) – ISBN 978 88 77 14 109 5 Bollettino della Società storica Locarnese, N.13 2010
- G.R. Rahn, I monumenti artistici del medio evo nel Cantone Ticino – Tipo litografia C. Salvioni 1894
- Leonardo & Architecture – Carlo Pedretti, CB Publishers ISBN 978 88 95686 21 9
- Schweiz by California Polytechnic State University 2012 ISBN 978 0 9835817 1 0
- Il Rivellino di Locarno – Documentary by P. Sciolli
