= Cassarate (river) =

River in Switzerland

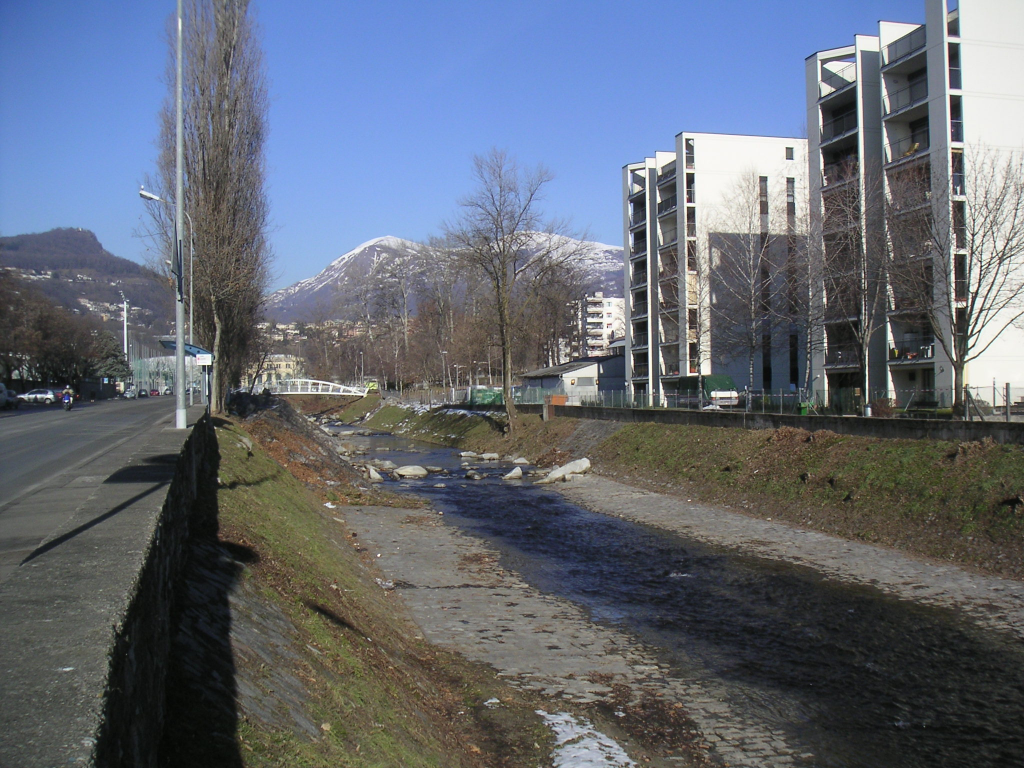
- Cassarate river in Lugano

Location
- Country: Switzerland

Physical characteristics
- Source
  - location: Monte Gazzirola / Val Colla
- Mouth
  - location: Lake Lugano at Lugano
  - coordinates: 46.0021°N 8.9616°E
- Length: 18.3 km (11.4 mi)

Basin features
- Progression: Lake Lugano

The Cassarate is a river of the Swiss canton of Ticino. It rises in the upper part of the Val Colla, on the slopes of Monte Gazzirola and the San Lucio Pass. It flows into Lake Lugano at Lugano.

On its way downstream, the river flows through the Val Colla valley before reaching the city centre of Lugano.

Historically, the lower reaches of the Cassarate river formed the boundary between the communities of Lugano (to the west) and Cassarate (to the east), but both communities now form part of the city.

== See also ==
- List of rivers of Switzerland
