= Furgghorn =

Mountain between Switzerland and Italy

- Tête du Breuil, Cima del Breuil
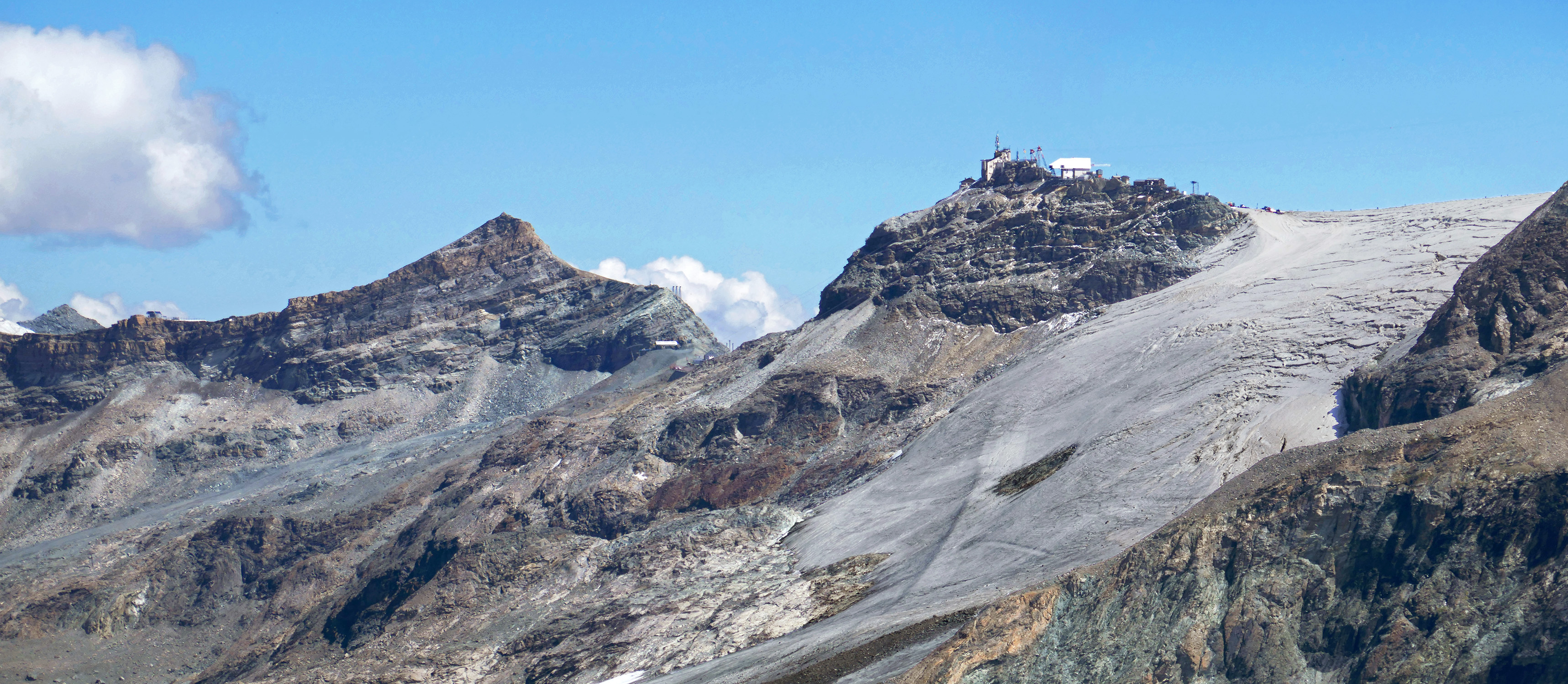

Highest point
- Elevation: 3,451 m (11,322 ft)
- Prominence: 100 m (330 ft)
- Parent peak: Furgggrat (3,492 m)
- Coordinates: 45°57′15″N 07°41′59″E

Geography
- Location within Alps
- Location: Valais, Switzerland; Aosta Valley, Italy
- Parent range: Pennine Alps

The Furgghorn (German; French: Tête du Breuil; Italian: Cima del Breuil) is a mountain of the Pennine Alps, located on the boundary between the canton of Valais (Switzerland) and the Aosta Valley (northern Italy). It lies on the range south-east of the Matterhorn, near the Theodul Pass. The closest locality is Breuil-Cervinia on the Italian side. The closest locality on the Swiss side is Zermatt.
