= Vetta del Vallone =

Mountain in Switzerland

- Location within Alps

Highest point
- Elevation: 2,135 m (7,005 ft)
- Prominence: 185 m (607 ft)
- Parent peak: Camoghè
- Coordinates: 46°07′22″N 9°05′07″E

Geography
- Location: Ticino, Switzerland; Lombardy, Italy
- Parent range: Lugano Prealps

The Vetta del Vallone is a mountain of the Lugano Prealps on the Swiss-Italian border. It is located between the Valle Morobbia (Ticino) and the Val Cavargna (Lombardy).

== SOIUSA classification ==
According to the SOIUSA (International Standardized Mountain Subdivision of the Alps) the mountain can be classified in the following way:

- main part = Western Alps
- major sector = North Western Alps
- section = Lugano Prealps
- subsection = Prealpi Comasche
- supergroup = Catena Gino-Camoghè-Fiorina
- group = Gruppo Camoghè-Bar
- subgroup = Sottogruppo del Camoghè
- code = I/B-11.I-A.2.a
