= Pilone =

Mountain in Switzerland

- Cima Pian del Bozzo
- Location within Alps

Highest point
- Elevation: 2,192 m (7,192 ft)
- Prominence: 80 m (260 ft)
- Coordinates: 46°13′06″N 8°31′57″E

Geography
- Location: Ticino, Switzerland; Piedmont, Italy
- Parent range: Lepontine Alps

The Pilone (also known as Cima Pian del Bozzo) is a mountain of the Lepontine Alps, located on the border between Switzerland and Italy. It lies between the Valle Vergeletto (Ticino) and the Valle Onsernone (Piedmont and Ticino).
