= Cima di Fojorina =

Mountain in Switzerland

- Cima di Fiorina
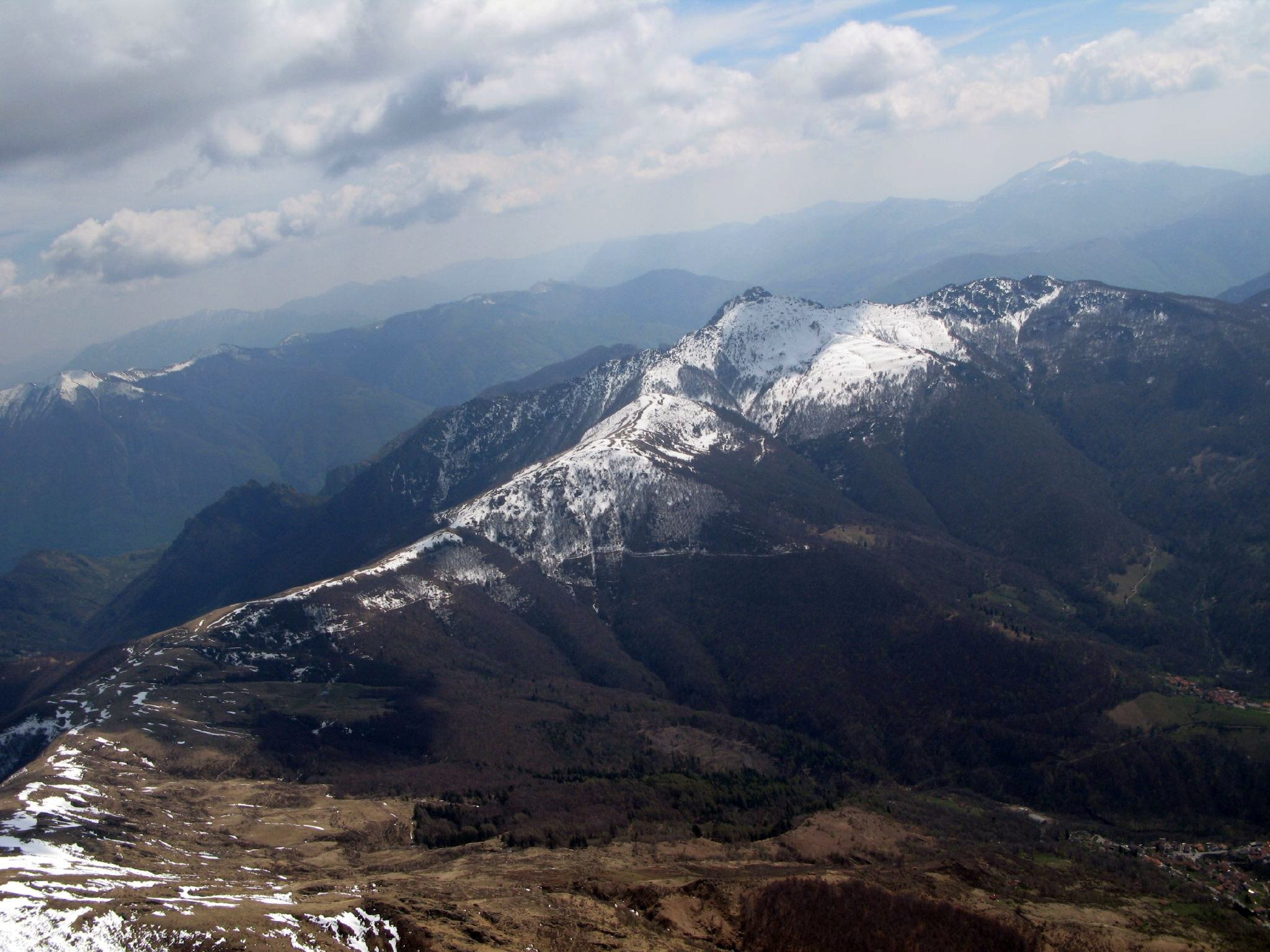

Highest point
- Elevation: 1,810 m (5,940 ft)
- Prominence: 305 m (1,001 ft)
- Coordinates: 46°03′45.5″N 9°04′22″E

Geography
- Location within Alps
- Location: Ticino, Switzerland; Lombardy, Italy
- Parent range: Lugano Prealps

The Cima di Fojorina (also spelled Cima di Fiorina) is a mountain of the Lugano Prealps, located on the border between Switzerland and Italy. It lies on the range separating the Val Colla from Lake Lugano.
