= Monte Boglia =

Mountain in Switzerland

- Colma Regia
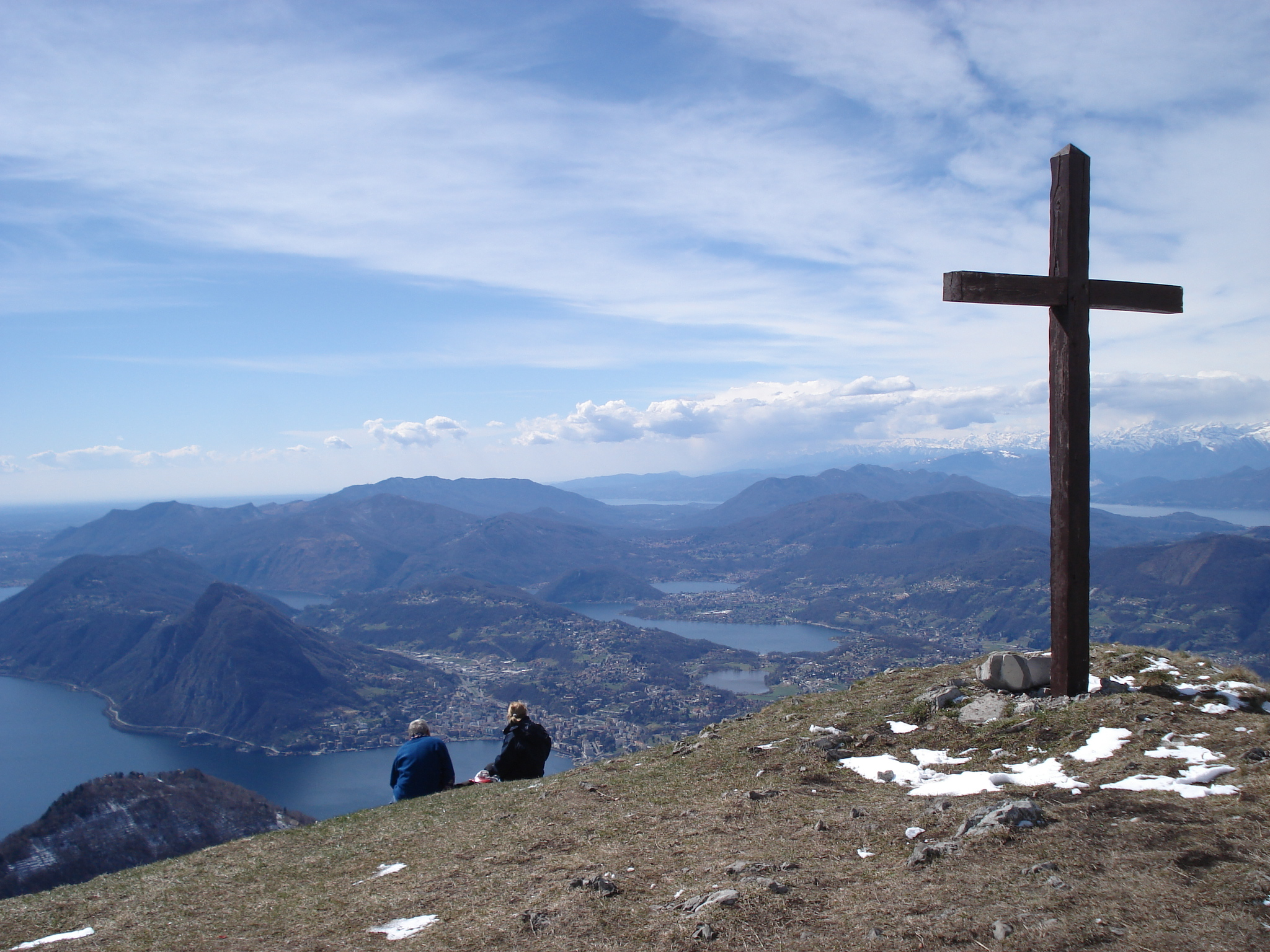
- The summit

Highest point
- Elevation: 1,516 m (4,974 ft)
- Prominence: 342 m (1,122 ft)
- Coordinates: 46°01′47″N 9°00′27″E

Geography
- Location within Alps
- Location: Ticino, Switzerland; Lombardy, Italy
- Parent range: Lugano Prealps

Monte Boglia (also known as Colma Regia) is a mountain whose peak is along the border of Ticino, Switzerland and Lombardy, Italy. It reaches an elevation of 1,516 metres and overlooks Lake Lugano on its southern side.

It is one of the few summits from which it's possible to see Lake Maggiore, Lake Lugano and Lake Como at the same time. Another such summit is Gazzirola.
