= Wandfluhhorn =

Mountain in Switzerland

- Pizzo Biela
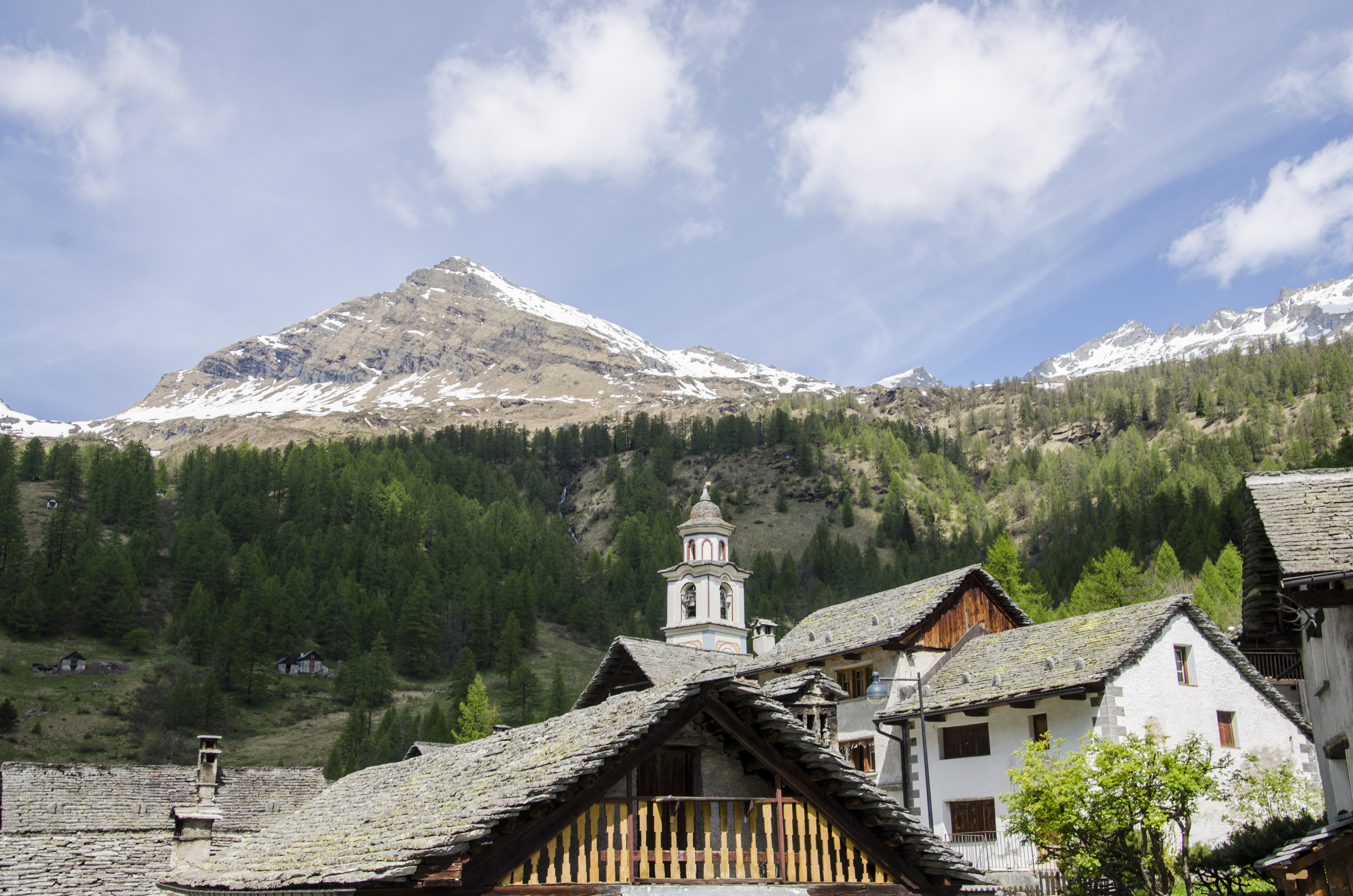
- Pizzo Biela, view from Bosco Gurin.

Highest point
- Elevation: 2,863 m (9,393 ft)
- Prominence: 452 m (1,483 ft)
- Parent peak: Basòdino
- Coordinates: 46°20′44″N 8°27′52″E

Geography
- Location within Alps
- Location: Piedmont, Italy; Ticino, Switzerland
- Parent range: Lepontine Alps

The Wandfluhhorn (also known as Pizzo Biela) is a mountain of the Lepontine Alps, located on the border between Switzerland and Italy. It overlooks Bosco/Gurin on its (Swiss) eastern side and Formazza on its (Italian) western side. Reaching a height of 2,863 metres above sea level, the Wandfluhhorn is the highest summit of the Bosco/Gurin valley.
