= Gazzirola =

Mountain in Switzerland

Garzirola
- Garzirola
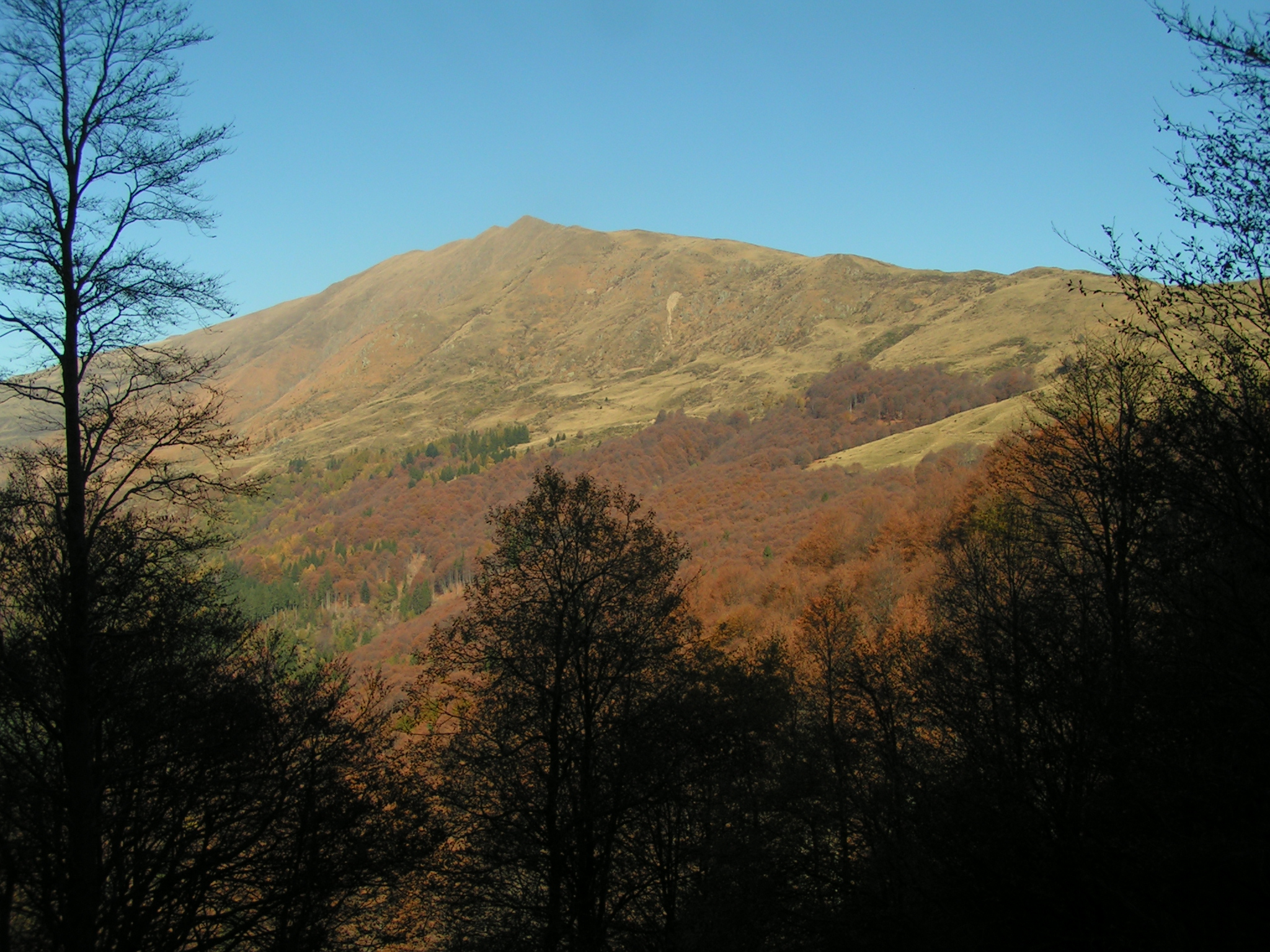
- View from Val Colla (south-west side)

Highest point
- Elevation: 2,116 m (6,942 ft)
- Prominence: 56 m (184 ft)
- Parent peak: Vetta del Vallone
- Coordinates: 46°07′05″N 9°04′21″E

Geography
- Location within Alps
- Location: Ticino, Switzerland; Lombardy, Italy
- Parent range: Lugano Prealps

The Gazzirola (also known as Garzirola) is a mountain of the Lugano Prealps on the Swiss-Italian border. Its summit is the highest point of the municipality of Lugano.

It is one of the few summits from which it's possible to see Lake Maggiore, Lake Lugano and Lake Como at the same time. Another such summit is Monte Boglia.

== SOIUSA classification ==
According to the SOIUSA (International Standardized Mountain Subdivision of the Alps) the mountain can be classified in the following way:

- main part = Western Alps
- major sector = North Western Alps
- section = Lugano Prealps
- subsection = Prealpi Comasche
- supergroup = Catena Gino-Camoghè-Fiorina
- group = Gruppo Camoghè-Bar
- subgroup = Sottogruppo del Camoghè
- code = I/B-11.I-A.2.a

== Mountain huts ==
Not far from the mountain are located three mountain huts: Capanna San Lucio (1,540 m), Rifugio San Lucio (1,554 m) and Rifugio Garzirola (1,974 m).
