= List of municipalities of the Province of Varese =

This is a list of the 136 municipalities (comuni) of the Province of Varese in the region of Lombardy in Italy.

== List ==
Municipality	Population (2026)	Area (km²)	Density
Agra	380	2.80	135.7
Albizzate	5,200	3.88	1,340.2
Angera	5,326	17.72	300.6
Arcisate	9,859	12.13	812.8
Arsago Seprio	4,727	10.51	449.8
Azzate	4,652	4.51	1,031.5
Azzio	758	2.17	349.3
Barasso	1,681	3.92	428.8
Bardello con Malgesso e Bregano	3,629	7.58	478.8
Bedero Valcuvia	664	2.56	259.4
Besano	2,513	3.43	732.7
Besnate	5,438	7.48	727.0
Besozzo	8,717	13.95	624.9
Biandronno	3,190	9.52	335.1
Bisuschio	4,253	7.03	605.0
Bodio Lomnago	2,255	4.04	558.2
Brebbia	3,137	6.87	456.6
Brenta	1,682	4.18	402.4
Brezzo di Bedero	1,214	9.95	122.0
Brinzio	765	6.40	119.5
Brissago-Valtravaglia	1,316	6.12	215.0
Brunello	918	1.62	566.7
Brusimpiano	1,174	5.91	198.6
Buguggiate	3,115	2.50	1,246.0
Busto Arsizio	84,595	30.66	2,759.1
Cadegliano-Viconago	2,120	10.27	206.4
Cadrezzate con Osmate	2,742	8.25	332.4
Cairate	7,886	11.26	700.4
Cantello	4,866	9.13	533.0
Caravate	2,532	5.13	493.6
Cardano al Campo	14,771	9.42	1,568.0
Carnago	6,610	6.21	1,064.4
Caronno Pertusella	18,556	8.40	2,209.0
Caronno Varesino	4,800	5.75	834.8
Casale Litta	2,775	10.59	262.0
Casalzuigno	1,409	7.32	192.5
Casciago	3,549	4.05	876.3
Casorate Sempione	5,631	6.91	814.9
Cassano Magnago	21,431	12.34	1,736.7
Cassano Valcuvia	647	3.95	163.8
Castellanza	13,890	6.93	2,004.3
Castello Cabiaglio	550	6.98	78.8
Castelseprio	1,330	3.75	354.7
Castelveccana	1,855	20.79	89.2
Castiglione Olona	7,454	6.90	1,080.3
Castronno	5,035	3.76	1,339.1
Cavaria con Premezzo	5,769	3.32	1,737.7
Cazzago Brabbia	779	4.00	194.8
Cislago	10,572	11.13	949.9
Cittiglio	3,805	11.11	342.5
Clivio	1,982	2.98	665.1
Cocquio-Trevisago	4,651	9.81	474.1
Comabbio	1,177	4.69	251.0
Comerio	2,784	5.55	501.6
Cremenaga	782	4.55	171.9
Crosio della Valle	624	1.44	433.3
Cuasso al Monte	3,545	16.18	219.1
Cugliate-Fabiasco	3,119	6.54	476.9
Cunardo	2,880	6.06	475.2
Curiglia con Monteviasco	141	10.85	13.0
Cuveglio	3,378	7.53	448.6
Cuvio	1,754	5.96	294.3
Daverio	3,030	4.03	751.9
Dumenza	1,461	18.40	79.4
Duno	163	2.49	65.5
Fagnano Olona	12,411	8.68	1,429.8
Ferno	6,715	8.66	775.4
Ferrera di Varese	694	1.53	453.6
Gallarate	53,023	20.98	2,527.3
Galliate Lombardo	1,035	3.27	316.5
Gavirate	9,145	12.01	761.4
Gazzada Schianno	4,635	4.84	957.6
Gemonio	2,871	3.67	782.3
Gerenzano	11,065	9.79	1,130.2
Germignaga	3,781	4.66	811.4
Golasecca	2,630	7.44	353.5
Gorla Maggiore	4,781	5.16	926.6
Gorla Minore	8,236	7.48	1,101.1
Gornate-Olona	2,212	4.70	470.6
Grantola	1,225	2.05	597.6
Inarzo	1,073	2.43	441.6
Induno Olona	10,446	12.37	844.5
Ispra	5,358	15.91	336.8
Jerago con Orago	5,177	3.87	1,337.7
Lavena Ponte Tresa	5,649	4.44	1,272.3
Laveno-Mombello	8,370	23.53	355.7
Leggiuno	3,621	13.19	274.5
Lonate Ceppino	5,177	4.84	1,069.6
Lonate Pozzolo	11,338	29.24	387.8
Lozza	1,211	1.71	708.2
Luino	14,003	21.01	666.5
Luvinate	1,349	4.07	331.4
Maccagno con Pino e Veddasca	2,293	41.96	54.6
Malnate	16,650	9.00	1,850.0
Marchirolo	3,571	5.49	650.5
Marnate	8,136	4.85	1,677.5
Marzio	311	1.86	167.2
Masciago Primo	275	1.81	151.9
Mercallo	1,782	5.48	325.2
Mesenzana	1,825	4.88	374.0
Montegrino Valtravaglia	1,522	10.10	150.7
Monvalle	1,889	4.54	416.1
Morazzone	4,320	5.60	771.4
Mornago	4,847	12.24	396.0
Oggiona con Santo Stefano	4,365	2.75	1,587.3
Olgiate Olona	12,953	7.21	1,796.5
Origgio	8,068	7.92	1,018.7
Orino	848	3.72	228.0
Porto Ceresio	2,785	5.34	521.5
Porto Valtravaglia	2,297	16.37	140.3
Rancio Valcuvia	911	4.45	204.7
Ranco	1,208	6.76	178.7
Saltrio	3,001	3.44	872.4
Samarate	16,232	16.01	1,013.9
Sangiano	1,437	2.22	647.3
Saronno	38,812	11.06	3,509.2
Sesto Calende	10,998	25.04	439.2
Solbiate Arno	4,047	3.03	1,335.6
Solbiate Olona	5,377	4.93	1,090.7
Somma Lombardo	17,931	30.51	587.7
Sumirago	5,978	11.75	508.8
Taino	3,554	7.63	465.8
Ternate	2,556	4.68	546.2
Tradate	19,101	21.48	889.2
Travedona-Monate	3,868	9.60	402.9
Tronzano Lago Maggiore	221	11.06	20.0
Uboldo	11,139	10.74	1,037.2
Valganna	1,591	12.42	128.1
Varano Borghi	2,492	3.33	748.3
Varese	79,100	54.84	1,442.4
Vedano Olona	7,452	7.08	1,052.5
Venegono Inferiore	5,922	5.88	1,007.1
Venegono Superiore	7,522	6.73	1,117.7
Vergiate	8,646	21.78	397.0
Viggiù	5,150	9.26	556.2
Vizzola Ticino	594	7.61	78.1

== See also ==
- List of municipalities of Lombardy
- List of municipalities of Italy
