= Croglio =

- Former municipality
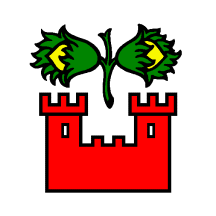
- Flag Coat of arms
- Location of Croglio
- Location within Switzerland Location within Canton of Ticino
- Coordinates: 45°59′N 8°45′E
- Country: Switzerland
- Canton: Ticino
- District: Lugano

Government
  - Mayor: Sindaco

Area
  - Total: 4.38 km^{2} (1.69 sq mi)
- Elevation: 342 m (1,122 ft)

Population (December 2019)
  - Total: 849
  - Density: 194/km^{2} (502/sq mi)
- Time zone: UTC+01:00 (CET)
  - Summer (DST): UTC+02:00 (CEST)
- Postal code: 6981
- SFOS number: 5178
- ISO 3166 code: CH-TI
- Surrounded by: Bedigliora, Cadegliano-Viconago (IT-VA), Lavena Ponte Tresa (IT-VA), Monteggio, Ponte Tresa, Pura, Sessa
- Website: croglio.ch

Croglio is a former municipality in the district of Lugano in the canton of Ticino in Switzerland. On 18 April 2021 the municipalities of Croglio, Monteggio, Ponte Tresa and Sessa merged to form Tresa.

== History ==
Croglio is first mentioned in 1335 as burgus de Crolio.

== Geography ==
Aerial view (1954)

Croglio had an area, as of 1997, of 4.38 square kilometers (1.69 sq mi). Of this area, 0.89 km^{2} (0.34 sq mi) or 20.3% is used for agricultural purposes, while 3.09 km^{2} (1.19 sq mi) or 70.5% is forested. Of the rest of the land, 0.63 km^{2} (0.24 sq mi) or 14.4% is settled (buildings or roads), 0.02 km^{2} (4.9 acres) or 0.5% is either rivers or lakes and 0.05 km^{2} (12 acres) or 1.1% is unproductive land.

Of the built up area, housing and buildings made up 7.1% and transportation infrastructure made up 3.9%. Power and water infrastructure as well as other special developed areas made up 2.5% of the area Out of the forested land, 63.7% of the total land area is heavily forested and 6.8% is covered with orchards or small clusters of trees. Of the agricultural land, 8.7% is used for growing crops, while 4.6% is used for orchards or vine crops and 7.1% is used for alpine pastures. All the water in the municipality is flowing water.

The former municipality is located in the Lugano district in the middle Malcantone valley. It consists of the settlements of Croglio, Castelrotto, Ronco, Madonna del Piano, Barico, Purasca and Biogno-Beride. Biogno and Beride were originally two independent municipalities with a shared administration. In 1907, they merged into a single municipality. In 1976 this municipality merged into Croglio. Between 1953 and 1976 the municipality of Croglio was known as Croglio-Castelrotto.

== Coat of arms ==
The blazon of the municipal coat of arms is Argent a doorless castle gules and in chief a hazel branch with two hazels vert fruited or.

== Demographics ==
Croglio had a population (as of 2019) of 849. As of 2008, 15.3% of the population are resident foreign nationals. Over the last 10 years (1997–2007) the population has changed at a rate of 4.9%.

Most of the population (as of 2000) speaks Italian (80.7%), with German being second most common (14.1%) and French being third (2.3%). Of the Swiss national languages (as of 2000), 122 speak German, 20 people speak French, 698 people speak Italian. The remainder (25 people) speak another language.

As of 2008, the gender distribution of the population was 47.5% male and 52.5% female. The population was made up of 341 Swiss men (40.1% of the population), and 63 (7.4%) non-Swiss men. There were 384 Swiss women (45.1%), and 63 (7.4%) non-Swiss women.

In 2008 there were 8 live births to Swiss citizens and 3 births to non-Swiss citizens, and in same time span there were 10 deaths of Swiss citizens. Ignoring immigration and emigration, the population of Swiss citizens decreased by 2 while the foreign population increased by 3. There were 2 Swiss men who emigrated from Switzerland and 2 Swiss women who immigrated back to Switzerland. At the same time, there were 6 non-Swiss men and 2 non-Swiss women who immigrated from another country to Switzerland. The total Swiss population change in 2008 (from all sources, including moves across municipal borders) was an increase of 13 and the non-Swiss population change was a decrease of 4 people. This represents a population growth rate of 1.1%.

The age distribution, as of 2009, in Croglio is; 85 children or 10.0% of the population are between 0 and 9 years old and 74 teenagers or 8.7% are between 10 and 19. Of the adult population, 77 people or 9.0% of the population are between 20 and 29 years old. 122 people or 14.3% are between 30 and 39, 126 people or 14.8% are between 40 and 49, and 96 people or 11.3% are between 50 and 59. The senior population distribution is 140 people or 16.5% of the population are between 60 and 69 years old, 88 people or 10.3% are between 70 and 79, there are 43 people or 5.1% who are over 80.

As of 2000, there were 372 private households in the municipality, and an average of 2.2 persons per household. In 2000 there were 278 single family homes (or 72.4% of the total) out of a total of 384 inhabited buildings. There were 60 two family buildings (15.6%) and 15 multi-family buildings (3.9%). There were also 31 buildings in the municipality that were multipurpose buildings (used for both housing and commercial or another purpose).

The vacancy rate for the municipality, in 2008, was 0.39%. In 2000 there were 479 apartments in the municipality. The most common apartment size was the 5 room apartment of which there were 153. There were 26 single room apartments and 153 apartments with five or more rooms. Of these apartments, a total of 371 apartments (77.5% of the total) were permanently occupied, while 102 apartments (21.3%) were seasonally occupied and 6 apartments (1.3%) were empty. As of 2007, the construction rate of new housing units was 1.2 new units per 1000 residents.

The historical population is given in the following chart:

== Notable people ==
- Helmut Horten (1909–1987 in Croglio) a German entrepreneur who built up and owned the fourth-largest chain of department stores in Germany – Horten AG. Lived in Croglio from 1968

== Sights ==
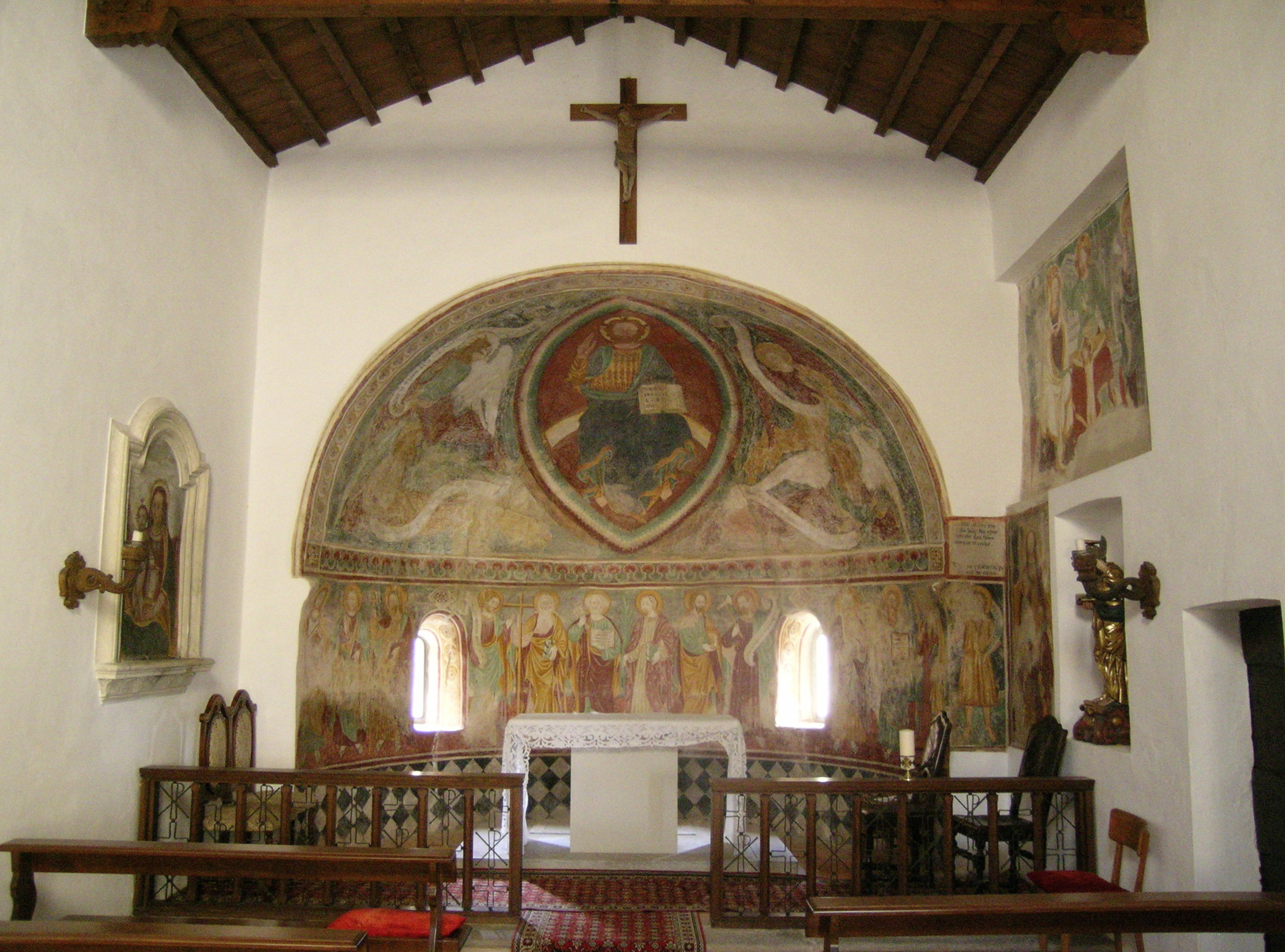
Interior of the church of San Bartolomeo

The entire village of Castelrotto is designated as part of the Inventory of Swiss Heritage Sites

== Politics ==
In the 2007 federal election the most popular party was the FDP which received 30.42% of the vote. The next three most popular parties were the CVP (22.46%), the SP (21.74%) and the Ticino League (9.78%). In the federal election, a total of 249 votes were cast, and the voter turnout was 38.9%.

In the 2007 Gran Consiglio election, there were a total of 634 registered voters in Croglio, of which 315 or 49.7% voted. 1 blank ballot was cast, leaving 314 valid ballots in the election. The most popular party was the PLRT which received 93 or 29.6% of the vote. The next three most popular parties were; the SSI (with 59 or 18.8%), the PPD+GenGiova (with 52 or 16.6%) and the PS (with 51 or 16.2%).

In the 2007 Consiglio di Stato election, 2 null ballots were cast, leaving 313 valid ballots in the election. The most popular party was the PLRT which received 86 or 27.5% of the vote. The next three most popular parties were; the PS (with 56 or 17.9%), the SSI (with 54 or 17.3%) and the PPD (with 51 or 16.3%).

== Economy ==
As of 2007, Croglio had an unemployment rate of 3.15%. As of 2005, there were 30 people employed in the primary economic sector and about 8 businesses involved in this sector. 331 people were employed in the secondary sector and there were 23 businesses in this sector. 563 people were employed in the tertiary sector, with 33 businesses in this sector. There were 426 residents of the municipality who were employed in some capacity, of which females made up 44.1% of the workforce.

In 2000, there were 764 workers who commuted into the municipality and 275 workers who commuted away. The municipality is a net importer of workers, with about 2.8 workers entering the municipality for every one leaving. About 38.6% of the workforce coming into Croglio are coming from outside Switzerland, while 0.7% of the locals commute out of Switzerland for work. Of the working population, 8% used public transportation to get to work, and 63.6% used a private car.

As of 2009, there were 2 hotels in Croglio.

== Religion ==
From the 2000 census, 623 or 72.0% were Roman Catholic, while 80 or 9.2% belonged to the Swiss Reformed Church. There are 129 individuals (or about 14.91% of the population) who belong to another church (not listed on the census), and 33 individuals (or about 3.82% of the population) did not answer the question.

== Education ==
The entire Swiss population is generally well educated. In Croglio about 78.3% of the population (between age 25–64) have completed either non-mandatory upper secondary education or additional higher education (either University or a Fachhochschule).

In Croglio there were a total of 123 students (as of 2009). The Ticino education system provides up to three years of non-mandatory kindergarten and in Croglio there were 26 children in kindergarten. The primary school program lasts for five years. In the municipality, 43 students attended the standard primary schools. In the lower secondary school system, students either attend a two-year middle school followed by a two-year pre-apprenticeship or they attend a four-year program to prepare for higher education. There were 26 students in the two-year middle school, while 11 students were in the four-year advanced program.

The upper secondary school includes several options, but at the end of the upper secondary program, a student will be prepared to enter a trade or to continue on to a university or college. In Ticino, vocational students may either attend school while working on their internship or apprenticeship (which takes three or four years) or may attend school followed by an internship or apprenticeship (which takes one year as a full-time student or one and a half to two years as a part-time student). There were 8 vocational students who were attending school full-time and 7 who attend part-time.

The professional program lasts three years and prepares a student for a job in engineering, nursing, computer science, business, tourism and similar fields. There were 2 students in the professional program. As of 2000, there were 6 students in Croglio who came from another municipality, while 81 residents attended schools outside the municipality.
