= Tresa, Switzerland =

Tresa
- Municipality
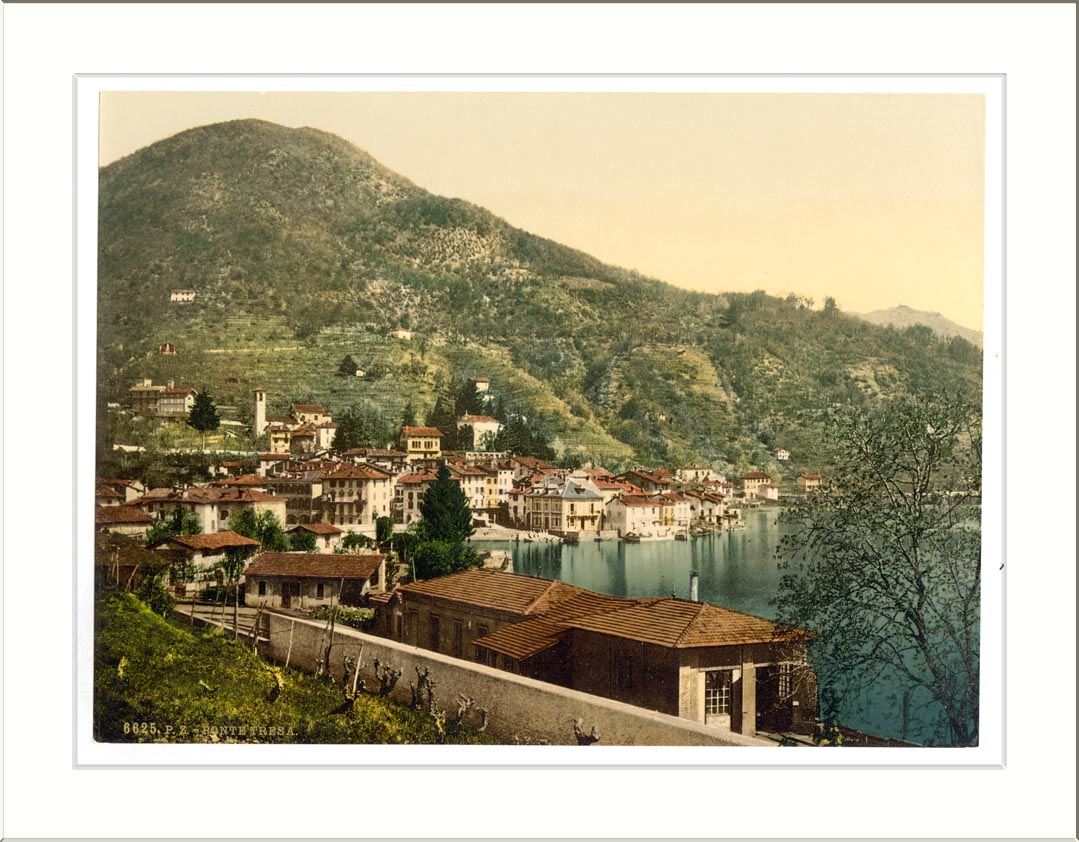
- Ponte Tresa village

- Flag Coat of arms
- Location of Tresa
- Location within Switzerland Location within Canton of Ticino
- Coordinates: 45°58′N 8°52′E
- Country: Switzerland
- Canton: Ticino
- District: Lugano

Government
  - Mayor: Sindaco

Area
  - Total: 11.05 km^{2} (4.27 sq mi)

Population (December 2019)
  - Total: 3,165
  - Density: 286.4/km^{2} (741.8/sq mi)
- Time zone: UTC+01:00 (CET)
  - Summer (DST): UTC+02:00 (CEST)
- Postal code: 6981,6988,6997,6998
- SFOS number: 5239
- ISO 3166 code: CH-TI
- Surrounded by: Caslano, Lavena, Lavena Ponte Tresa (Italy)
- Website: www.tresa.ch

Tresa is a municipality in the district of Lugano in the canton of Ticino in Switzerland. It was created on 18 April 2021 through the merger of Croglio, Monteggio, Ponte Tresa and Sessa.

== History ==
=== Croglio ===
Croglio is first mentioned in 1335 as burgus de Crolio.

=== Monteggio ===
Monteggio is first mentioned in 1466 as da Montegio. Until 1819 the current village core was called Albio. The name comes from the fortified seat of the Capitanei of Sessa, the ruins of which are on the site of the Chapel of S. Adalberto (first mentioned in 1428) located in Castello. During the Middle Ages the history of Monteggio was closely connected to the Sessa family. The communities in the Valley of Tresa (Monteggio, Ponte Tresa and Croglio) were given special privileges, because they had special military and defensive obligations. The tax exemptions granted in the 14th century by the Duke of Milan were reconfirmed in 1513 by the Swiss Confederation.

Religiously, Monteggio belongs to the parish of Sessa.

In the past, many industries operated in Monteggio, including; brickworks, mills, hammer mills, fishing and a sawmill. By the middle of the 19th century, peat was cut near the village and there was a foundry. In the past few decades, various commercial and industrial enterprises have settled in the municipality.

=== Ponte Tresa ===
Ponte Tresa is first mentioned in 818 as ad Tresiae Pontem, though this comes from a 12th-century copy of the earlier document. In 875 it was mentioned as Ponte Tretia. In German it was known as Treisbruck, though this name is no longer used.

Aerial view by Walter Mittelholzer (1919)

The history of the town is closely tied to the Tresa river crossing, which was first mentioned in 590 by Gregory of Tours. The name of the municipality, and the neighboring, Italian town of Lavena Ponte Tresa, both come from the river. From the Middle Ages until the opening of the Melide dam in 1847, the municipality provided strategically important connections to Italy. Even in the Roman era there was probably a bridge or a ford across the river near the modern village. During the Middle Ages and into the early modern era, the bridge was a wooden bridge with stone pillars. Below the bridge there were fish ponds, which were mostly stocked with eels that belonged to the Bishop of Milan. In the 16th century the bridge was in the possession of local noble families. Until 1828, it remained the property of the de Stoppani family, and then it was purchased by the Canton. The Canton built a new stone bridge in 1846. The current bridge dates from 1962.

At Rocchetta, in the area above the town, lie the ruins of the Comacine masters castle of S. Martino, which was destroyed in the war between Como and Milan (1118–27). During the Middle Ages, Ponte Tresa enjoyed certain responsibilities and privileges in connection with border control, tolls and upkeep on the bridge. The Duke of Milan granted the village a tax exemption, which was confirmed by the Swiss Confederation in the 15th century.

The village church belong to the parish of Lavena Ponte Tresa until 1821 when it became an independent parish. The church of S. Bernardino dates from the 15th century, and was renovated in 1972–82.

The railway Lugano-Ponte Tresa was inaugurated in 1912.

=== Sessa ===
Sessa is first mentioned in 1335 as Sexa.

In the High Middle Ages, members of the Langobard military family, the de Sessa formed a noble corporation with lands centered in the current municipality. The noble corporation remained in power around the village until the reign of the Swiss Confederation. The Capitani of (de) Sessa were Imperial vassals. In 1240, Emperor Frederick II took control of Sessa Castle, which was probably in the village. Due to the tradition of imperial immediacy in the Malcantone region (including Sessa, Astano and Monteggio), the Bishop of Como lacked the landlord rights that he held in neighboring villages. The population of these villages also tried to separate themselves spiritually from the bishop. By the 16th century, and perhaps even before then, they founded an independent parish which also included Monteggio, Castelrotto and Cremenaga. Cremenaga, which was in Italian territory, only separated from the parish in 1842. The parish church of San Martino was first mentioned in 1288 and its present form dates back to 1630. In addition to San Martino, the city has a number of other chapels and churches, including S. Orsola (established 1601). At the time of the Swiss Confederation rule, the capitano reggente of Lugano was the bailiff in Sessa. He heard cases in the court building, which was known as the casa dei Landvogti.

Agriculture and emigration marked the traditional economy. In the 19th century, local companies exploited the peat layer at Prati Vergani and gold mines at Monte Sceree (between Sessa and Astano). The mining activity was resumed in the 20th century by the company Mines de Costano SA, which was active from 1935 until the early 1950s.

== Geography ==
After the merger, Tresa has an area, (as of the 2004/09 survey), of 11.05 km^{2} (4.27 sq mi).

== Demographics ==
The new municipality has a population (as of December 2020) of 3,165.

== Sights ==
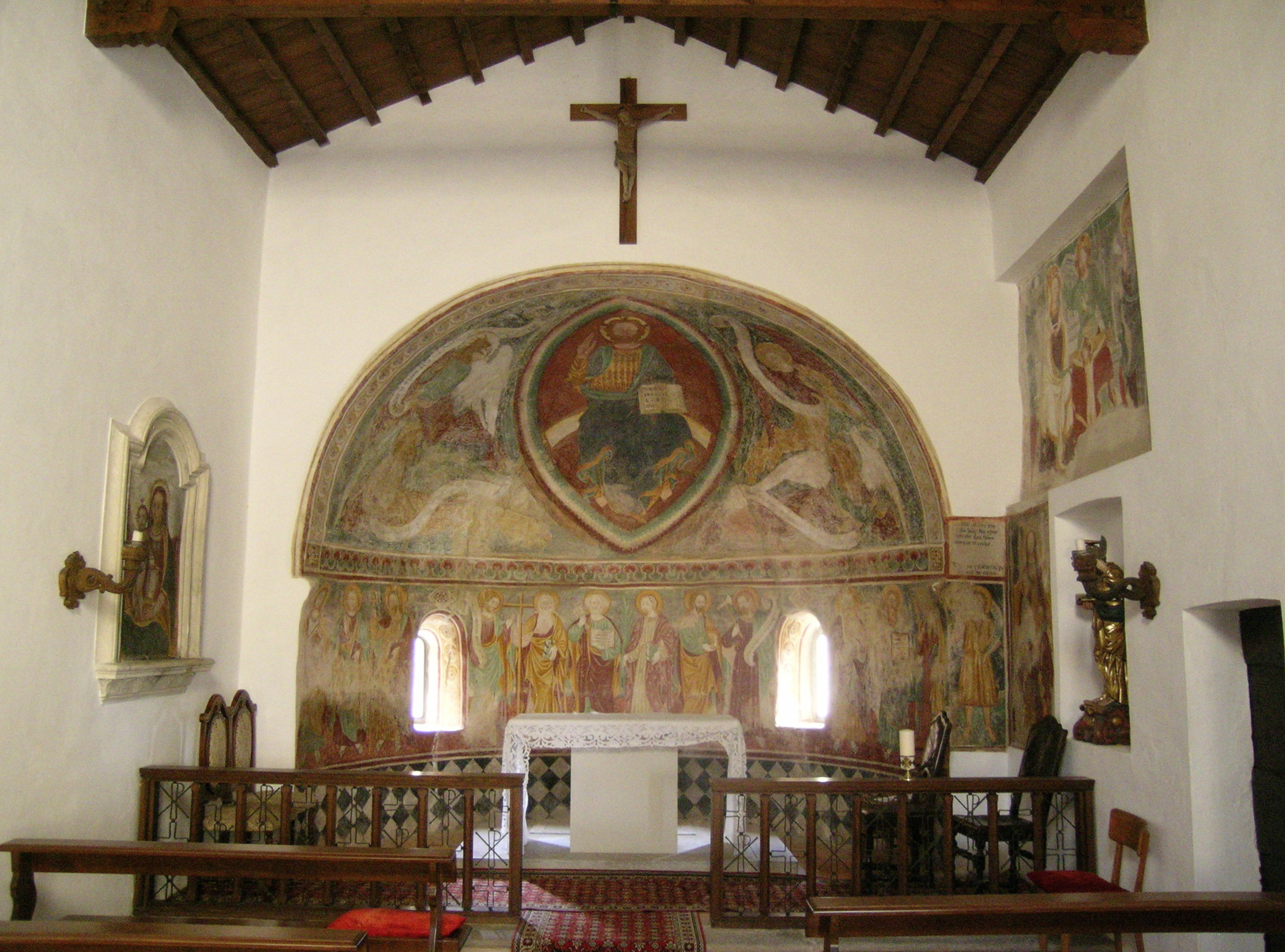
Interior of the church of San Bartolomeo

The entire villages of Castelrotto and Sessa are designated as part of the Inventory of Swiss Heritage Sites.

== Weather ==
Ponte Tresa has an average of 103.8 days of rain or snow per year and on average receives 1,806 mm (71.1 in) of precipitation. The wettest month is May during which time Ponte Tresa receives an average of 226 mm (8.9 in) of rain. During this month there is precipitation for an average of 13.4 days. The driest month of the year is December with an average of 70 mm (2.8 in) of precipitation over 5.8 days.
