= Sessa, Ticino =

Sessa
- Former municipality
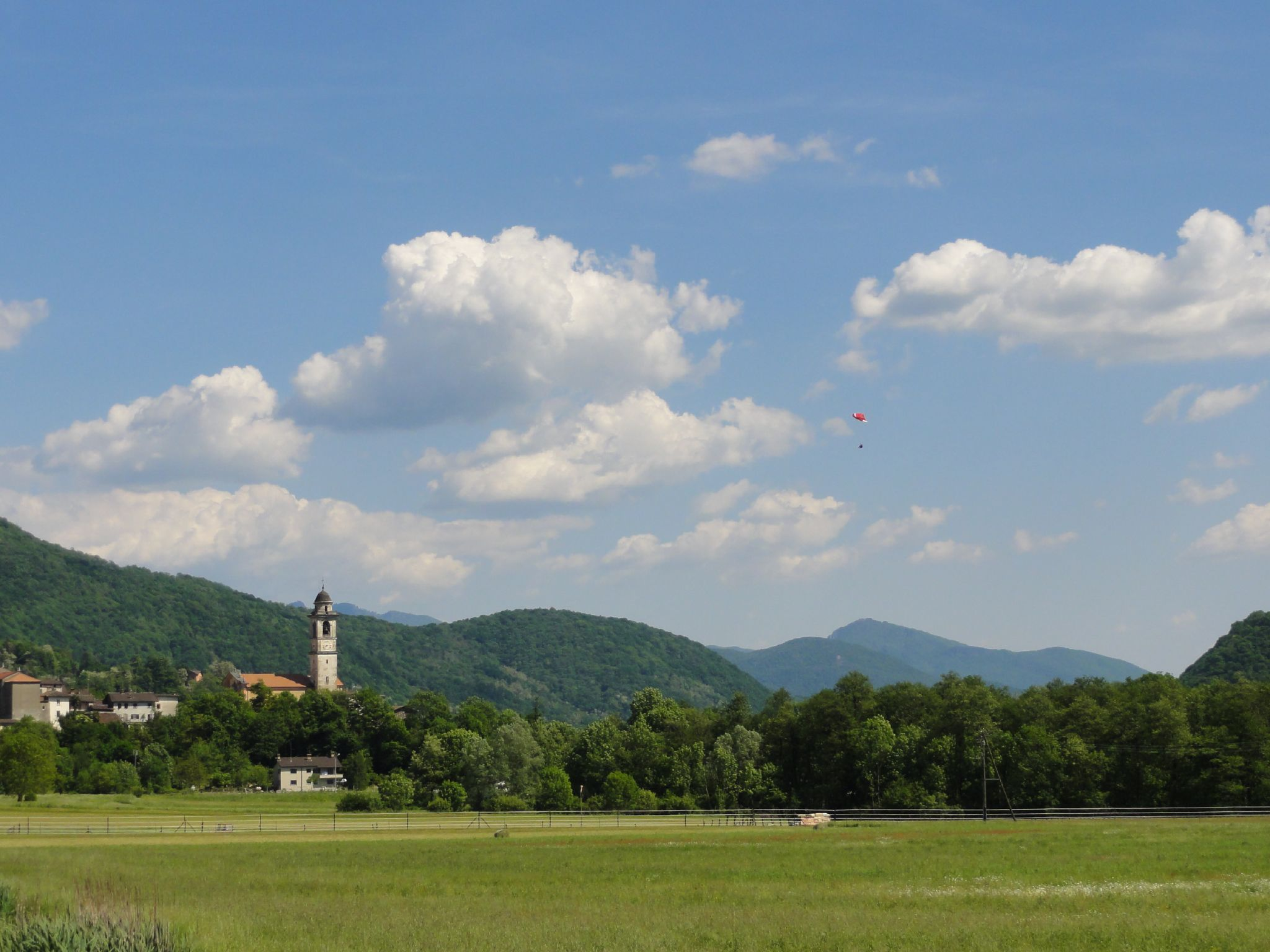
- Sessa village

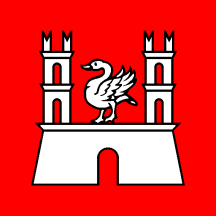
- Flag Coat of arms
- Location of Sessa
- Location within Switzerland Location within Canton of Ticino
- Coordinates: 46°00′N 8°49′E
- Country: Switzerland
- Canton: Ticino
- District: Lugano

Government
  - Mayor: Sindaco

Area
  - Total: 2.87 km^{2} (1.11 sq mi)
- Elevation: 393 m (1,289 ft)

Population (December 2019)
  - Total: 685
  - Density: 239/km^{2} (618/sq mi)
- Time zone: UTC+01:00 (CET)
  - Summer (DST): UTC+02:00 (CEST)
- Postal code: 6997
- SFOS number: 5222
- ISO 3166 code: CH-TI
- Localities: Costa, Beredino, Lanera, Bonzaglio, Suino
- Surrounded by: Astano, Bedigliora, Croglio, Curio, Dumenza (IT-VA), Monteggio
- Website: www.sessa-ti.ch

Sessa is a former municipality in the district of Lugano in the canton of Ticino in Switzerland. On 18 April 2021 the municipalities of Croglio, Monteggio, Ponte Tresa and Sessa merged to form Tresa.

== History ==
Sessa is first mentioned in 1335 as Sexa.

In the High Middle Ages, members of the Langobard military family, the de Sessa formed a noble corporation with lands centered in the current municipality. The noble corporation remained in power around the village until the reign of the Swiss Confederation. The Capitani of (de) Sessa were Imperial vassals. In 1240, Emperor Frederick II took control of Sessa Castle, which was probably in the village. Due to the tradition of imperial immediacy in the Malcantone region (including Sessa, Astano, and Monteggio), the Bishop of Como lacked the landlord rights he held in neighboring villages. The population of these villages also tried to separate themselves spiritually from the bishop. By the 16th century, and perhaps even before then, they founded an independent parish which also included Monteggio, Castelrotto, and Cremenaga. Cremenaga, which was in Italian territory, only separated from the parish in 1842. The parish church of San Martino was first mentioned in 1288, and its present form dates back to 1630. In addition to San Martino, the city has several other chapels and churches, including S. Orsola (established 1601). At the time of the Swiss Confederation rule, the capitano reggente of Lugano was the bailiff in Sessa. He heard cases in the court building known as the casa dei Landvogti.

Agriculture and emigration marked the traditional economy. In the 19th century local companies exploited the peat layer at Prati Vergani and gold mines at Monte Sceree (between Sessa and Astano). The mining activity was resumed in the 20th century by the company Mines de Costano SA, active from 1935 until the early 1950s.

=== (de) Sessa family ===
The (de) Sessa's were originally from the Langobard nobility. They were vassals of the House of Hohenstaufen when they lived in Sessa Castle, which controlled the passage over the Tresa river. This ended in 1240 when Emperor Frederick II took over the castle. The numerous representatives of the family formed a noble corporation, which along with the Vicin family retained power until the reign of the Confederates. Around the 13th century, a (de) Sessa was mentioned who bore the Capitanei title in Locarno. As members of the Capitanei of Locarno in the 14th century, they possessed patronage rights to the chapel of S. Orsola in the church of S. Martino in Sessa. The family spread throughout Lombardy, where presumably the Sala (Varese) branch split off. This line is first mentioned in the 1277 list of the Milanese aristocracy. By the beginning of 16th century the direct line of the family had died out. Anyway, other minor lines have survived and the family, still flourishing, is present on the Libro d'Oro della Nobiltà Italiana and on the Annuario della Nobiltà Italiana with the title of Noble.

== Geography ==
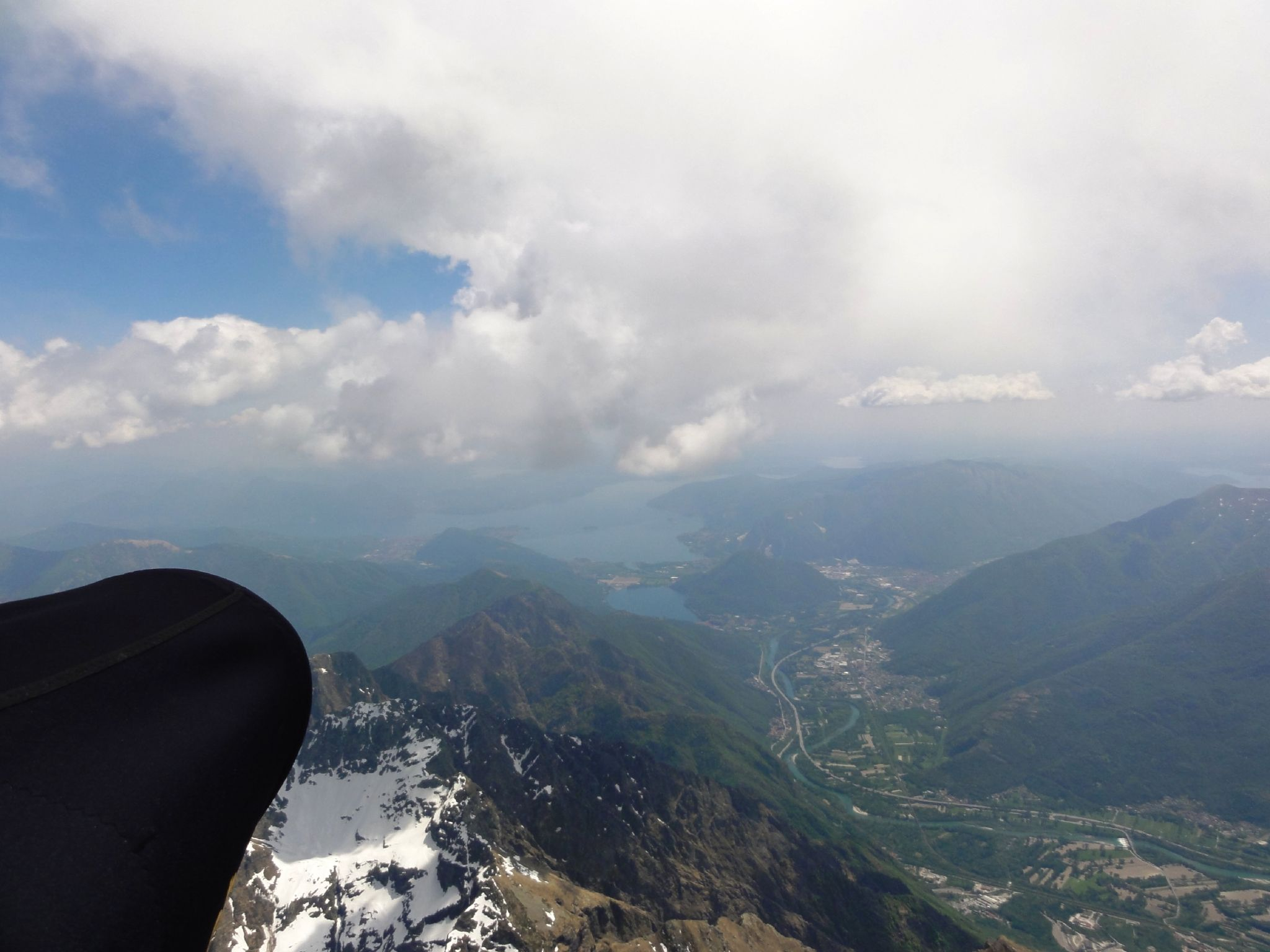
Malcatone valley near Sessa

Sessa had an area, as of 1997, of 2.87 square kilometers (1.11 sq mi). Of this area, 0.78 km^{2} (0.30 sq mi) or 27.2% is used for agricultural purposes, while 1.89 km^{2} (0.73 sq mi) or 65.9% is forested. Of the rest of the land, 0.33 km^{2} (0.13 sq mi) or 11.5% is settled (buildings or roads) and 0.03 km^{2} (7.4 acres) or 1.0% is unproductive land.

Of the built up area, housing and buildings made up 6.6% and transportation infrastructure made up 2.8%. while parks, green belts and sports fields made up 1.4%. Out of the forested land, 57.8% of the total land area is heavily forested and 8.0% is covered with orchards or small clusters of trees. Of the agricultural land, 17.4% is used for growing crops, while 3.1% is used for orchards or vine crops and 6.6% is used for alpine pastures.

The former municipality is located in the Lugano district, in the mid-Malcantone. It consists of the village core of Sessa and the surrounding settlements of Beredino, Bonzaglio, Costa, Lanera and Suino.

== Coat of arms ==
The blazon of the municipal coat of arms is Gules a castle with two towers argent ensigned with a swan of the same.

== Demographics ==
Sessa had a population (as of 2019) of 685. As of 2008, 18.8% of the population are resident foreign nationals. Over the last 10 years (1997–2007) the population has changed at a rate of 10.4%.

Most of the population (as of 2000) speaks Italian (74.7%), with German being second most common (17.7%) and French being third (2.8%). Of the Swiss national languages (as of 2000), 107 speak German, 17 people speak French, 451 people speak Italian, and 1 person speaks Romansh. The remainder (28 people) speak another language.

As of 2008, the gender distribution of the population was 47.9% male and 52.1% female. The population was made up of 251 Swiss men (37.4% of the population), and 71 (10.6%) non-Swiss men. There were 295 Swiss women (43.9%), and 55 (8.2%) non-Swiss women.

In 2008 there were 5 live births to Swiss citizens and were 4 deaths of Swiss citizens and 2 non-Swiss citizen deaths. Ignoring immigration and emigration, the population of Swiss citizens increased by 1 while the foreign population decreased by 2. There were 2 Swiss men and 1 Swiss woman who immigrated back to Switzerland. At the same time, there were 2 non-Swiss men and 3 non-Swiss women who immigrated from another country to Switzerland. The total Swiss population change in 2008 (from all sources, including moves across municipal borders) was a decrease of 4 and the non-Swiss population change was a decrease of 2 people. This represents a population growth rate of -0.9%.

The age distribution, as of 2009, in Sessa is; 60 children or 8.9% of the population are between 0 and 9 years old and 72 teenagers or 10.7% are between 10 and 19. Of the adult population, 63 people or 9.4% of the population are between 20 and 29 years old. 78 people or 11.6% are between 30 and 39, 92 people or 13.7% are between 40 and 49, and 117 people or 17.4% are between 50 and 59. The senior population distribution is 87 people or 12.9% of the population are between 60 and 69 years old, 59 people or 8.8% are between 70 and 79, there are 44 people or 6.5% who are over 80.

As of 2000, there were 265 private households in the municipality, and an average of 2.3 persons per household. In 2000 there were 218 single family homes (or 72.9% of the total) out of a total of 299 inhabited buildings. There were 48 two family buildings (16.1%) and 15 multi-family buildings (5.0%). There were also 18 buildings in the municipality that were multipurpose buildings (used for both housing and commercial or another purpose).

The vacancy rate for the municipality, in 2008, was 0.48%. In 2000 there were 389 apartments in the municipality. The most common apartment size was the 5 room apartment of which there were 128. There were 6 single room apartments and 128 apartments with five or more rooms. Of these apartments, a total of 261 apartments (67.1% of the total) were permanently occupied, while 127 apartments (32.6%) were seasonally occupied and 1 apartments (0.3%) were empty. As of 2007, the construction rate of new housing units was 2.9 new units per 1000 residents.

The historical population is given in the following chart:

== Sights ==
The entire village of Sessa is designated as part of the Inventory of Swiss Heritage Sites.

== Politics ==
In the 2007 federal election the most popular party was the FDP which received 29.41% of the vote. The next three most popular parties were the CVP (27.8%), the Green Party (13.57%) and the Ticino League (10.86%). In the federal election, a total of 254 votes were cast, and the voter turnout was 54.4%.

In the 2007 Gran Consiglio election, there were a total of 475 registered voters in Sessa, of which 300 or 63.2% voted. 2 blank ballots and 1 null ballot were cast, leaving 297 valid ballots in the election. The most popular party was the PLRT which received 68 or 22.9% of the vote. The next three most popular parties were; the PLRT (with 68 or 22.9%), the SSI (with 51 or 17.2%) and the LEGA (with 34 or 11.4%).

In the 2007 Consiglio di Stato election, 1 blank ballot was cast, leaving 299 valid ballots in the election. The most popular party was the PPD which received 74 or 24.7% of the vote. The next three most popular parties were; the PLRT (with 58 or 19.4%), the LEGA (with 51 or 17.1%) and the PS (with 47 or 15.7%).

== Economy ==
As of 2007, Sessa had an unemployment rate of 4.67%. As of 2005, there were 17 people employed in the primary economic sector and about 8 businesses involved in this sector. 21 people were employed in the secondary sector and there were 3 businesses in this sector. 50 people were employed in the tertiary sector, with 17 businesses in this sector. There were 248 residents of the municipality who were employed in some capacity, of which females made up 37.5% of the workforce.

In 2000, there were 94 workers who commuted into the municipality and 171 workers who commuted away. The municipality is a net exporter of workers, with about 1.8 workers leaving the municipality for every one entering. About 31.9% of the workforce coming into Sessa are coming from outside Switzerland. Of the working population, 11.3% used public transportation to get to work, and 62.9% used a private car.

As of 2009, there were 2 hotels in Sessa.

== Religion ==
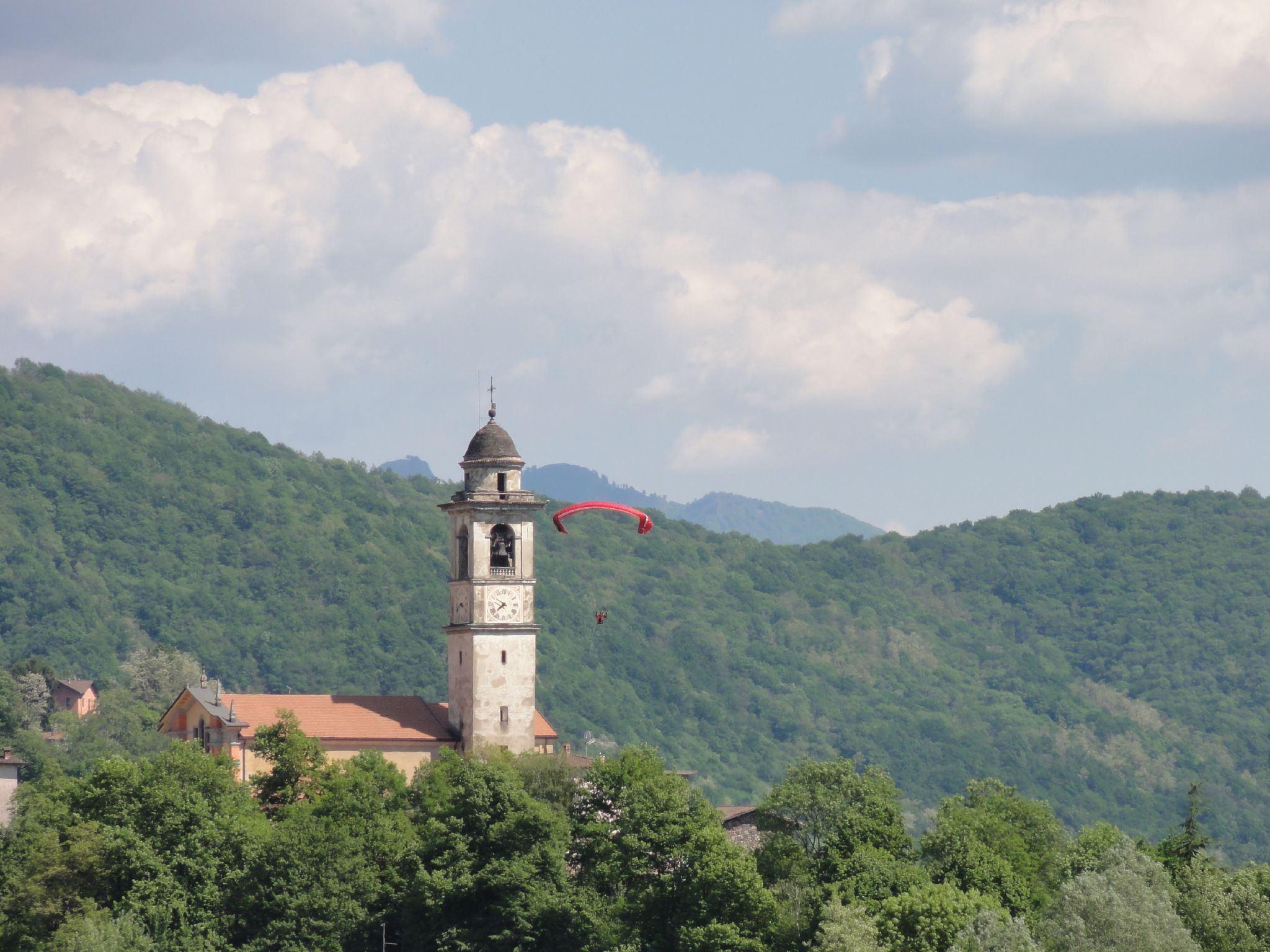
Church in Sessa

From the 2000 census, 447 or 74.0% were Roman Catholic, while 62 or 10.3% belonged to the Swiss Reformed Church. There are 86 individuals (or about 14.24% of the population) who belong to another church (not listed on the census), and 9 individuals (or about 1.49% of the population) did not answer the question.

== Education ==
In Sessa about 74.8% of the population (between age 25 and 64) have completed either non-mandatory upper secondary education or additional higher education (either university or a Fachhochschule).

In Sessa there were a total of 113 students (as of 2009). The Ticino education system provides up to three years of non-mandatory kindergarten and in Sessa there were 18 children in kindergarten. The primary school program lasts for five years and includes both a standard school and a special school. In the municipality, 28 students attended the standard primary schools and 3 students attended the special school. In the lower secondary school system, students either attend a two-year middle school followed by a two-year pre-apprenticeship or they attend a four-year program to prepare for higher education. There were 35 students in the two-year middle school and 1 in their pre-apprenticeship, while 11 students were in the four-year advanced program.

The upper secondary school includes several options, but at the end of the upper secondary program, a student will be prepared to enter a trade or to continue on to a university or college. In Ticino, vocational students may either attend school while working on their internship or apprenticeship (which takes three or four years) or may attend school followed by an internship or apprenticeship (which takes one year as a full-time student or one and a half to two years as a part-time student). There were 5 vocational students who were attending school full-time and 11 who attend part-time.

The professional program lasts three years and prepares a student for a job in engineering, nursing, computer science, business, tourism and similar fields. There was 1 student in the professional program.

As of 2000, there were 3 students in Sessa who came from another municipality, while 62 residents attended schools outside the municipality.

== Notable people ==
- Ignazio Cassis (born 1961), physician and President of the Swiss Confederation since January 2022.
