= Brezzo di Bedero =

- Comune
- Comune di Brezzo di Bedero
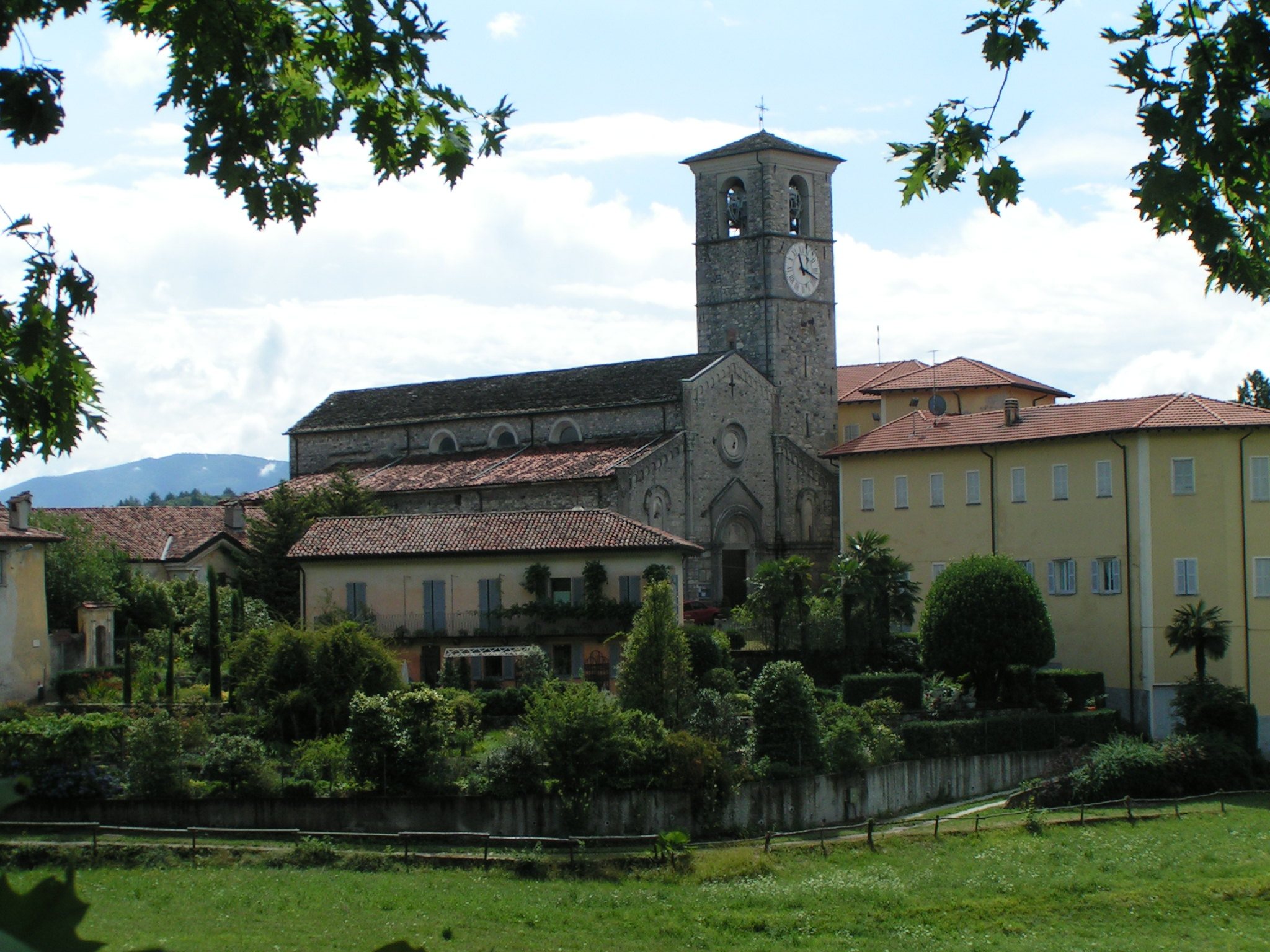
- Church in Brezzo di Bedero

- Coat of arms

- Location within Italy Location within Lombardy
- Coordinates: 45°59′N 8°43′E
- Country: Italy
- Region: Lombardy
- Province: Varese (VA)
- Frazioni: Bedero, Brezzo, Pralongo, Casa Passera, casa fioroli, Alcio, La Canonica, Trigo, Casa Sirpo, Nonedo, Cà Bianca, Casa Spozio, Villaggio Olandese

Government
  - Mayor: Maria Grazia Campagnani

Area
  - Total: 8.2 km^{2} (3.2 sq mi)
- Elevation: 352 m (1,155 ft)

Population (Dec. 2004)
  - Total: 984
  - Density: 120/km^{2} (310/sq mi)
- Demonym: Bederesi
- Time zone: UTC+1 (CET)
  - Summer (DST): UTC+2 (CEST)
- Postal code: 21010
- Dialing code: 0332
- Patron saint: St. Victor
- Website: Official website

Brezzo di Bedero is a comune (municipality) in the Province of Varese in the Italian region Lombardy, located about 70 kilometres (43 mi) northwest of Milan and about 20 kilometres (12 mi) northwest of Varese.

Brezzo di Bedero borders the following municipalities: Brissago-Valtravaglia, Cannero Riviera, Germignaga, Oggebbio, Porto Valtravaglia.
