= Porto Valtravaglia =

- Comune
- Comune di Porto Valtravaglia
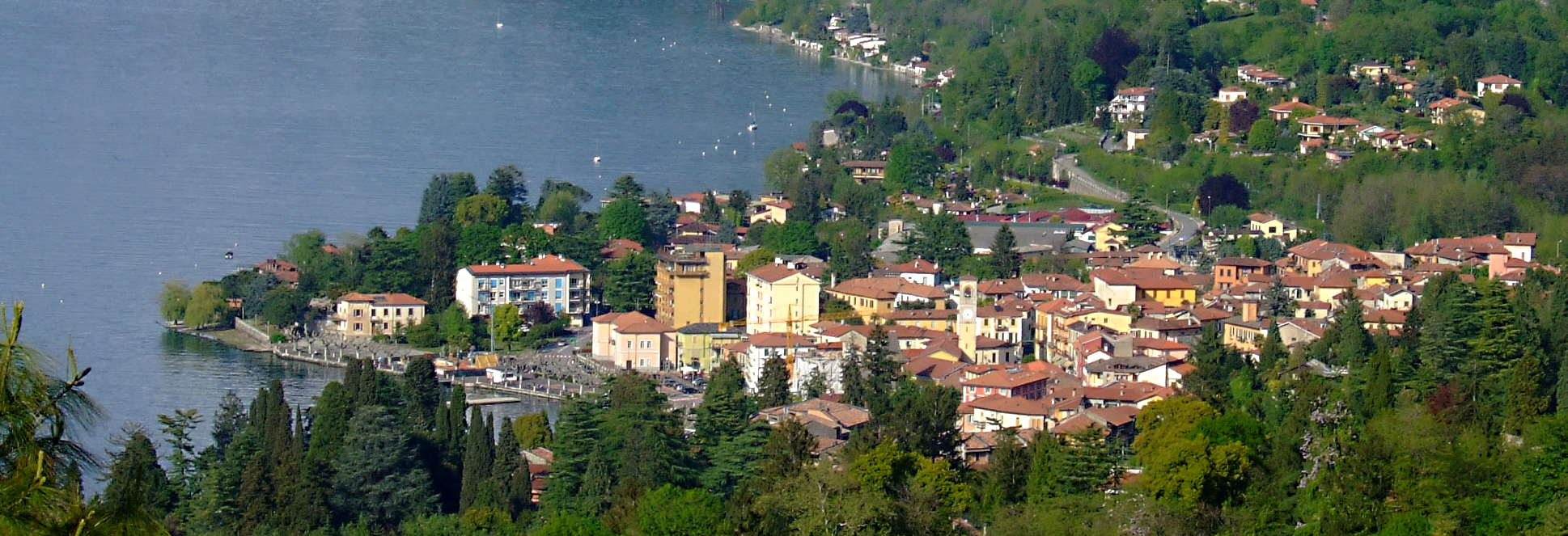
- Porto Valtravaglia

- Coat of arms

- Location within Italy Location within Lombardy
- Coordinates: 45°58′N 8°42′E
- Country: Italy
- Region: Lombardy
- Province: Varese (VA)
- Frazioni: Ligurno, Muceno, Musadino, San Michele, C.na Profarè, C.na Bassa, Monte Pian Nave, Monte della Colonna, Monte Ganna, Domo, Torre, Casa Piano Croce

Government
  - Mayor: Bruno Virgilio Barassi

Area
  - Total: 16.0 km^{2} (6.2 sq mi)
- Elevation: 199 m (653 ft)

Population (Dec. 2004)
  - Total: 2,464
  - Density: 154/km^{2} (399/sq mi)
- Demonym: Portovaltravagliesi
- Time zone: UTC+1 (CET)
  - Summer (DST): UTC+2 (CEST)
- Postal code: 21010
- Dialing code: 0332
- Patron saint: Madonna Assunta
- Saint day: August 15
- Website: Official website

Porto Valtravaglia is a comune (municipality) of c. 2,400 inhabitants in the Province of Varese in the Italian region Lombardy, located about 70 kilometres (43 mi) northwest of Milan and about 20 kilometres (12 mi) northwest of Varese.

Porto Valtravaglia borders the following municipalities: Brezzo di Bedero, Brissago-Valtravaglia, Casalzuigno, Castelveccana, Duno, Ghiffa and Oggebbio.

Dario Fo, Nobel Prize in literature of 1997, spent his childhood and adolescence here, and the little village played a central role in the development of his artistic specificity and production. In fact, it was the mix of people from different countries, working at the local, renowned blown glass factory and speaking an array of languages, that inspired the creation by Fo of the Grammelot, an original new idiom mixing a number of regional dialects. Listening to the stories told by the inhabitants of the village, typically fishermen, peasants, glass blowers and smugglers, then, introduced and trained him to the art of storytelling, of which he was a great representative. Eventually, it was again the local population, often busy with nightly jobs, who inspired one of his novels, "Il paese dei Mezarat" (the village of the bats).

== Demographic evolution ==
Historical population

Year	Pop.	±%
1861	1,534	—
1871	1,762	+14.9%
1881	1,789	+1.5%
1901	1,838	+2.7%
1911	1,986	+8.1%

Year	Pop.	±%
1921	1,994	+0.4%
1931	1,980	−0.7%
1936	1,743	−12.0%
1951	2,041	+17.1%
1961	2,313	+13.3%

Year	Pop.	±%
1971	2,449	+5.9%
1981	2,479	+1.2%
1991	2,409	−2.8%
2001	2,387	−0.9%

Source: Data from ISTAT
