= Brenta, Lombardy =

Brenta
- Comune
- Comune di Brenta
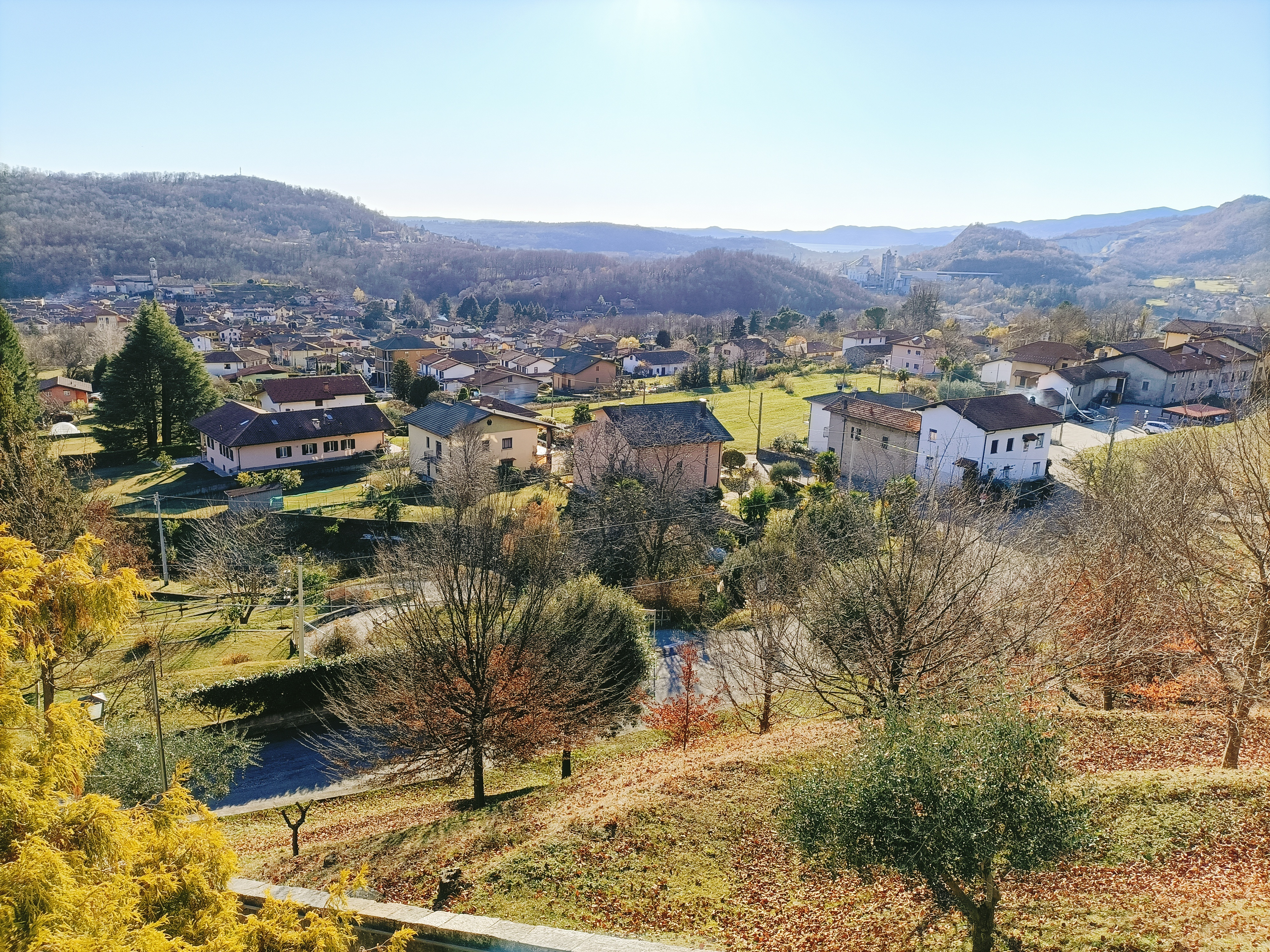
- View of Brenta

- Location within Italy Location within Lombardy
- Coordinates: 45°54′N 8°41′E
- Country: Italy
- Region: Lombardy
- Province: Varese (VA)

Government
  - Mayor: Gianpietro Ballardin

Area
  - Total: 4.18 km^{2} (1.61 sq mi)
- Elevation: 276 m (906 ft)

Population (30 April 2017)
  - Total: 1,697
  - Density: 406/km^{2} (1,050/sq mi)
- Demonym: Brentesi
- Time zone: UTC+1 (CET)
  - Summer (DST): UTC+2 (CEST)
- Postal code: 21030
- Dialing code: 0332
- Website: Official website

Brenta is a comune (municipality) in the Province of Varese in the Italian region Lombardy, located about 60 kilometres (37 mi) northwest of Milan and about 15 kilometres (9 mi) northwest of Varese.

Brenta borders the following municipalities: Azzio, Casalzuigno, Castelveccana, Cittiglio, Gemonio.
