= Mesenzana =

- Comune
- Comune di Mesenzana
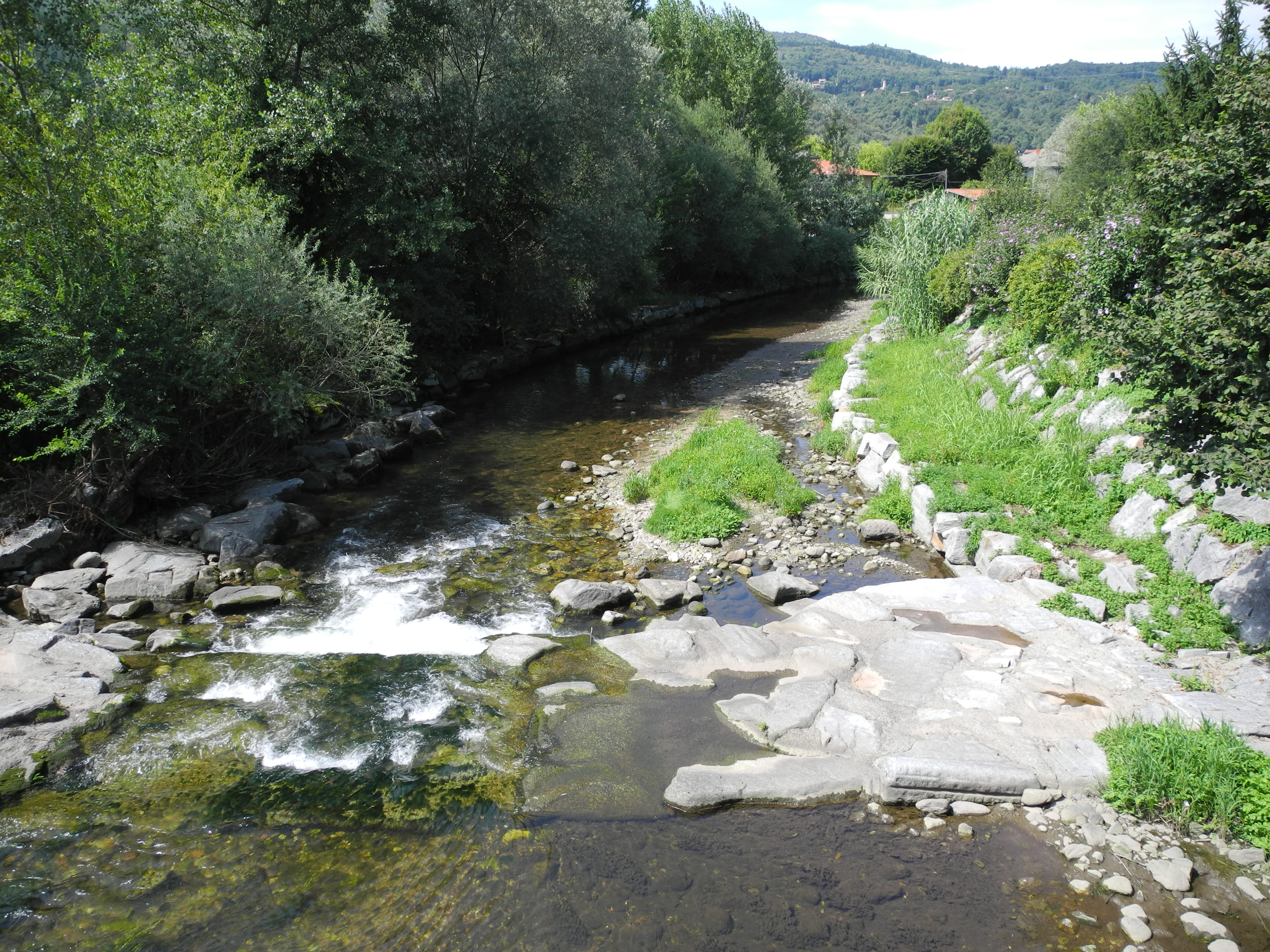

- Location within Italy Location within Lombardy
- Coordinates: 45°57′N 8°46′E
- Country: Italy
- Region: Lombardy
- Province: Province of Varese (VA)
- Frazioni: Malpensata, Molino d'Anna, Pezza, Maro, Cà Bianca nuova, Pianazzo, Piatta, Alpe Cavoglio, Gesiola del monte San Martino, Le Cascine

Area
  - Total: 4.9 km^{2} (1.9 sq mi)
- Elevation: 305 m (1,001 ft)

Population (Dec. 2004)
  - Total: 1,318
  - Density: 270/km^{2} (700/sq mi)
- Demonym: Mesenzanesi
- Time zone: UTC+1 (CET)
  - Summer (DST): UTC+2 (CEST)
- Postal code: 21030
- Dialing code: 0332
- Website: Official website

Mesenzana is a comune (municipality) in the Province of Varese in the Italian region Lombardy, located about 60 kilometres (37 mi) northwest of Milan and about 15 kilometres (9 mi) northwest of Varese. As of 31 December 2004, it had a population of 1,318 and an area of 4.9 square kilometres (1.9 mi^{2}).

The municipality of Mesenzana contains the frazioni (subdivisions, mainly villages and hamlets) Malpensata, Molino d'Anna, Pezza, Maro, Cà Bianca nuova, Pianazzo, Piatta, Alpe Cavoglio, Gesiola del monte San Martino, and Le Cascine.

Mesenzana borders the following municipalities: Brissago-Valtravaglia, Cassano Valcuvia, Duno, Grantola, Montegrino Valtravaglia.

== Demographic evolution ==
Historical population

Year	Pop.	±%
1861	610	—
1871	623	+2.1%
1881	661	+6.1%
1901	728	+10.1%
1911	778	+6.9%

Year	Pop.	±%
1921	656	−15.7%
1931	593	−9.6%
1936	550	−7.3%
1951	636	+15.6%
1961	703	+10.5%

Year	Pop.	±%
1971	835	+18.8%
1981	963	+15.3%
1991	1,020	+5.9%
2001	1,231	+20.7%

Source: Data from ISTAT
