= Duno, Lombardy =

Duno
- Comune
- Comune di Duno
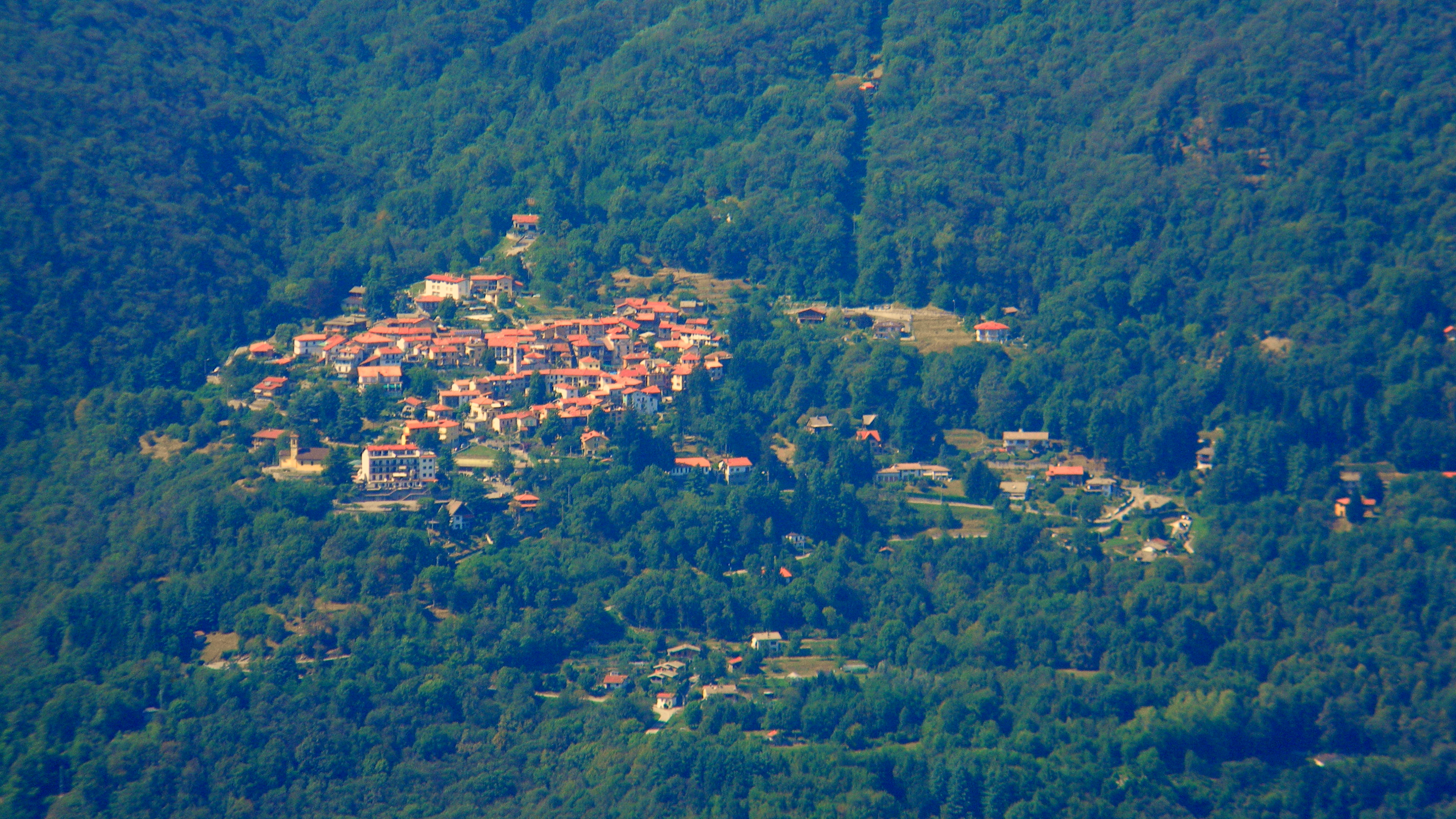

- Location within Italy Location within Lombardy
- Coordinates: 45°55′N 8°44′E
- Country: Italy
- Region: Lombardy
- Province: Varese (VA)

Government
  - Mayor: Francesco Paglia

Area
  - Total: 2.59 km^{2} (1.00 sq mi)
- Elevation: 530 m (1,740 ft)

Population (31 July 2017)
  - Total: 131
  - Density: 50.6/km^{2} (131/sq mi)
- Demonym: Dunesi
- Time zone: UTC+1 (CET)
  - Summer (DST): UTC+2 (CEST)
- Postal code: 21030
- Dialing code: 0332
- Website: Official website

Duno is a comune (municipality) in the Province of Varese in the Italian region Lombardy, located about 60 kilometres (37 mi) northwest of Milan and about 14 kilometres (9 mi) northwest of Varese. Duno borders the following municipalities: Brissago-Valtravaglia, Casalzuigno, Cassano Valcuvia, Cuveglio, Mesenzana, Porto Valtravaglia.
