= Orino, Lombardy =

Orino
- Comune
- Comune di Orino
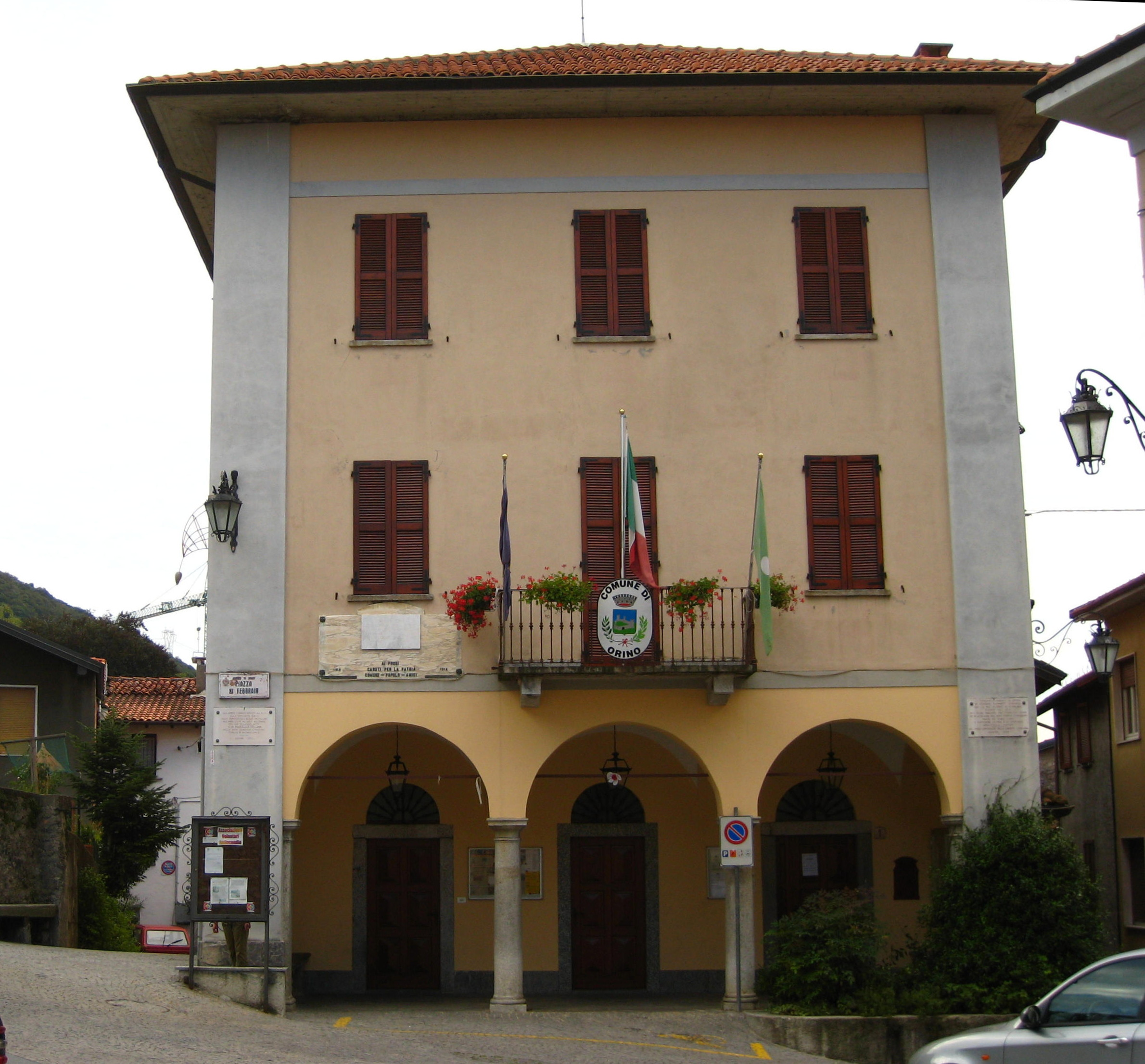

- Location within Italy Location within Lombardy
- Coordinates: 45°53′N 8°43′E
- Country: Italy
- Region: Lombardy
- Province: Province of Varese (VA)

Area
  - Total: 3.8 km^{2} (1.5 sq mi)

Population (Dec. 2004)
  - Total: 831
  - Density: 220/km^{2} (570/sq mi)
- Demonym: Orinesi
- Time zone: UTC+1 (CET)
  - Summer (DST): UTC+2 (CEST)
- Postal code: 21030
- Dialing code: 0332
- Website: Official website

Orino is a comune (municipality) in the Province of Varese in the Italian region Lombardy, located about 60 kilometres (37 mi) northwest of Milan and about 12 kilometres (7 mi) northwest of Varese. As of 31 December 2004, it had a population of 831 and an area of 3.8 square kilometres (1.5 mi^{2}).

Orino borders the following municipalities: Azzio, Cocquio-Trevisago, Cuvio.

== Population history ==
Historical population

Year	Pop.	±%
1861	507	—
1871	519	+2.4%
1881	621	+19.7%
1901	667	+7.4%
1911	689	+3.3%

Year	Pop.	±%
1921	637	−7.5%
1931	469	−26.4%
1936	434	−7.5%
1951	436	+0.5%
1961	453	+3.9%

Year	Pop.	±%
1971	546	+20.5%
1981	600	+9.9%
1991	664	+10.7%
2001	779	+17.3%

Source: Data from ISTAT
