= Monteggio =

- Former municipality
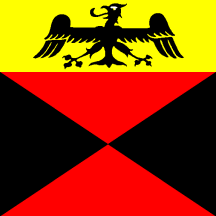
- Flag Coat of arms
- Location of Monteggio
- Location within Switzerland Location within Canton of Ticino
- Coordinates: 46°00′N 8°49′E
- Country: Switzerland
- Canton: Ticino
- District: Lugano

Government
  - Mayor: Sindaco

Area
  - Total: 3.36 km^{2} (1.30 sq mi)
- Elevation: 420 m (1,380 ft)

Population (December 2019)
  - Total: 849
  - Density: 253/km^{2} (654/sq mi)
- Time zone: UTC+01:00 (CET)
  - Summer (DST): UTC+02:00 (CEST)
- Postal code: 6998
- SFOS number: 5202
- ISO 3166 code: CH-TI
- Localities: Bosco, Bruciata, Busino, Cassinone, Castello, Crocivaglio, Fonderia, Fornasette, Genestraio, Isole, Lisora, Molinazzo, Persico, Pirla, Ponte Cremenaga, Ramello, Rancina, Ressiga, Roncaccio, Ronchetto, Rovedera, Selvacce, Suino, Termine, and Tiradelsa
- Surrounded by: Cadegliano-Viconago (Italy), Cremenaga (Italy), Croglio, Dumenza (Italy), Luino (Italy), Sessa
- Website: www.monteggio.ch

Monteggio is a former municipality in the district of Lugano in the canton of Ticino in Switzerland. On 18 April 2021 the municipalities of Croglio, Monteggio, Ponte Tresa and Sessa merged to form Tresa.

== History ==
Monteggio is first mentioned in 1466 as da Montegio. Until 1819 the current village core was called Albio. The name comes from the fortified seat of the Capitanei of Sessa, the ruins of which are on the site of the Chapel of S. Adalberto (first mentioned in 1428) located in Castello. During the Middle Ages the history of Monteggio was closely connected to the Sessa family. The communities in the Valley of Tresa (Monteggio, Ponte Tresa and Croglio) were given special privileges, because they had special military and defensive obligations. The tax exemptions granted in the 14th century by the Duke of Milan were reconfirmed in 1513 by the Swiss Confederation.

Religiously, Monteggio belongs to the parish of Sessa.

In the past, many industries operated in Monteggio, including; brickworks, mills, hammer mills, fishing and a sawmill. By the middle of the 19th century, peat was cut near the village and there was a foundry. In the past few decades, various commercial and industrial enterprises have settled in the municipality.

== Geography ==
Monteggio had an area, as of 1997, of 3.36 square kilometers (1.30 sq mi). Of this area, 1.36 km^{2} (0.53 sq mi) or 40.5% is used for agricultural purposes, while 1.64 km^{2} (0.63 sq mi) or 48.8% is forested. Of the rest of the land, 0.65 km^{2} (0.25 sq mi) or 19.3% is settled (buildings or roads), 0.09 km^{2} (22 acres) or 2.7% is either rivers or lakes and 0.07 km^{2} (17 acres) or 2.1% is unproductive land.

Of the built up area, housing and buildings made up 13.4% and transportation infrastructure made up 2.4%. Power and water infrastructure as well as other special developed areas made up 2.1% of the area Out of the forested land, 43.5% of the total land area is heavily forested and 5.4% is covered with orchards or small clusters of trees. Of the agricultural land, 22.9% is used for growing crops, while 4.2% is used for orchards or vine crops and 13.4% is used for alpine pastures. All the water in the municipality is flowing water. Of the unproductive areas, all of it is unproductive vegetation.

The former municipality is located in the Lugano district, in the lower Malcantone valley on the Italian border. It is broken up into 26 sections or settlements including Brusata, Castello, Fornasette, Lisora, Molinazzo and Ponte Cremenaga.

== Coat of arms ==
The blazon of the municipal coat of arms is Per saltire gules and sable and in a chief or an eagle displayed sable.

== Demographics ==
Monteggio had a population (as of 2019) of 849. As of 2008, 16.7% of the population are resident foreign nationals. Over the last 10 years (1997–2007) the population has changed at a rate of 11%.

Most of the population (as of 2000) speaks Italian (79.6%), with German being second most common (14.5%) and French being third (2.4%). Of the Swiss national languages (as of 2000), 114 speak German, 19 people speak French, 624 people speak Italian. The remainder (27 people) speak another language.

As of 2008, the gender distribution of the population was 48.8% male and 51.2% female. The population was made up of 357 Swiss men (40.2% of the population), and 77 (8.7%) non-Swiss men. There were 377 Swiss women (42.4%), and 78 (8.8%) non-Swiss women.

In 2008 there were 7 live births to Swiss citizens and 1 birth to non-Swiss citizens, and in same time span there were 5 deaths of Swiss citizens and 2 non-Swiss citizen deaths. Ignoring immigration and emigration, the population of Swiss citizens increased by 2 while the foreign population decreased by 1. There was 1 Swiss man and 1 Swiss woman who immigrated back to Switzerland. At the same time, there were 3 non-Swiss men and 5 non-Swiss women who immigrated from another country to Switzerland. The total Swiss population change in 2008 (from all sources, including moves across municipal borders) was an increase of 1 and the non-Swiss population remained the same. This represents a population growth rate of 0.1%.

The age distribution, as of 2009, in Monteggio is; 82 children or 9.2% of the population are between 0 and 9 years old and 77 teenagers or 8.7% are between 10 and 19. Of the adult population, 65 people or 7.3% of the population are between 20 and 29 years old. 132 people or 14.8% are between 30 and 39, 143 people or 16.1% are between 40 and 49, and 113 people or 12.7% are between 50 and 59. The senior population distribution is 152 people or 17.1% of the population are between 60 and 69 years old, 86 people or 9.7% are between 70 and 79, there are 39 people or 4.4% who are over 80.

As of 2000, there were 352 private households in the municipality, and an average of 2.2 persons per household. In 2000 there were 319 single family homes (or 78.8% of the total) out of a total of 405 inhabited buildings. There were 47 two family buildings (11.6%) and 27 multi-family buildings (6.7%). There were also 12 buildings in the municipality that were multipurpose buildings (used for both housing and commercial or another purpose).

The vacancy rate for the municipality, in 2008, was 0%. In 2000 there were 536 apartments in the municipality. The most common apartment size was the 4 room apartment of which there were 172. There were 21 single room apartments and 147 apartments with five or more rooms. Of these apartments, a total of 352 apartments (65.7% of the total) were permanently occupied, while 179 apartments (33.4%) were seasonally occupied and 5 apartments (0.9%) were empty. As of 2007, the construction rate of new housing units was 1.1 new units per 1000 residents.

The historical population is given in the following chart:

== Politics ==
In the 2007 federal election the most popular party was the FDP which received 31.9% of the vote. The next three most popular parties were the CVP (19.35%), the Ticino League (17.87%) and the SP (13.26%). In the federal election, a total of 229 votes were cast, and the voter turnout was 35.9%.

In the 2007 Gran Consiglio election, there were a total of 655 registered voters in Monteggio, of which 303 or 46.3% voted. 7 blank ballots and 1 null ballot were cast, leaving 295 valid ballots in the election. The most popular party was the PLRT which received 88 or 29.8% of the vote. The next three most popular parties were; the SSI (with 54 or 18.3%), the PPD+GenGiova (with 43 or 14.6%) and the LEGA (with 41 or 13.9%).

In the 2007 Consiglio di Stato election, 5 blank ballots were cast, leaving 298 valid ballots in the election. The most popular party was the PLRT which received 84 or 28.2% of the vote. The next three most popular parties were; the LEGA (with 66 or 22.1%), the SSI (with 45 or 15.1%) and the PPD (with 43 or 14.4%).

== Economy ==
As of 2007, Monteggio had an unemployment rate of 3.33%. As of 2005, there were 17 people employed in the primary economic sector and about 5 businesses involved in this sector. 378 people were employed in the secondary sector and there were 13 businesses in this sector. 83 people were employed in the tertiary sector, with 25 businesses in this sector. There were 374 residents of the municipality who were employed in some capacity, of which females made up 40.4% of the workforce.

In 2000, there were 670 workers who commuted into the municipality and 257 workers who commuted away. The municipality is a net importer of workers, with about 2.6 workers entering the municipality for every one leaving. About 47.0% of the workforce coming into Monteggio are coming from outside Switzerland, while none of the locals commute out of Switzerland for work. Of the working population, 8% used public transportation to get to work, and 63.4% used a private car.

== Religion ==
From the 2000 census, 561 or 71.6% were Roman Catholic, while 72 or 9.2% belonged to the Swiss Reformed Church. There are 98 individuals (or about 12.50% of the population) who belong to another church (not listed on the census), and 53 individuals (or about 6.76% of the population) did not answer the question.

== Education ==
In Monteggio about 67.3% of the population (between age 25-64) have completed either non-mandatory upper secondary education or additional higher education (either university or a Fachhochschule).

In Monteggio there were a total of 122 students (as of 2009). The Ticino education system provides up to three years of non-mandatory kindergarten and in Monteggio there were 25 children in kindergarten. The primary school program lasts for five years. In the municipality, 37 students attended the standard primary schools. In the lower secondary school system, students either attend a two-year middle school followed by a two-year pre-apprenticeship or they attend a four-year program to prepare for higher education. There were 24 students in the two-year middle school, while 18 students were in the four-year advanced program.

The upper secondary school includes several options, but at the end of the upper secondary program, a student will be prepared to enter a trade or to continue on to a university or college. In Ticino, vocational students may either attend school while working on their internship or apprenticeship (which takes three or four years) or may attend school followed by an internship or apprenticeship (which takes one year as a full-time student or one and a half to two years as a part-time student). There were 10 vocational students who were attending school full-time and 8 who attend part-time.

As of 2000, there were 54 students from Monteggio who attended schools outside the municipality.
