= Montegrino Valtravaglia =

- Comune
- Comune di Montegrino Valtravaglia
- Location within Italy Location within Lombardy
- Coordinates: 45°58′29″N 8°46′06″E
- Country: Italy
- Region: Lombardy
- Province: Varese (VA)
- Frazioni: Bonera, Bosco Valtravaglia, Ostino, Sciorbagno, Pipetta, Sorti, Cucco, San Martino, Casa De Andrea, Casa Compagnoni, Segrada, Porsù, Pianca, Alpe del Campogino, Monte Sette Termini (I Bedeloni), Riviera, Casa Briccoli, Piana, Case Sciarè

Government
  - Mayor: Fabrizio Prato

Area
  - Total: 10.3 km^{2} (4.0 sq mi)
- Elevation: 525 m (1,722 ft)

Population (31 December 2014)
  - Total: 1,501
  - Density: 146/km^{2} (377/sq mi)
- Demonym: Montegrinesi
- Time zone: UTC+1 (CET)
  - Summer (DST): UTC+2 (CEST)
- Postal code: 21010
- Dialing code: 0332
- Website: Official website

Montegrino Valtravaglia is a comune (municipality) in the Province of Varese in the Italian region Lombardy, located about 110 kilometres (68 mi) northwest of Milan and about 70 kilometres (43 mi) west of Varese.

Montegrino Valtravaglia borders the following municipalities: Brissago-Valtravaglia, Cadegliano-Viconago, Cremenaga, Cugliate-Fabiasco, Germignaga, Grantola, Luino, Mesenzana.

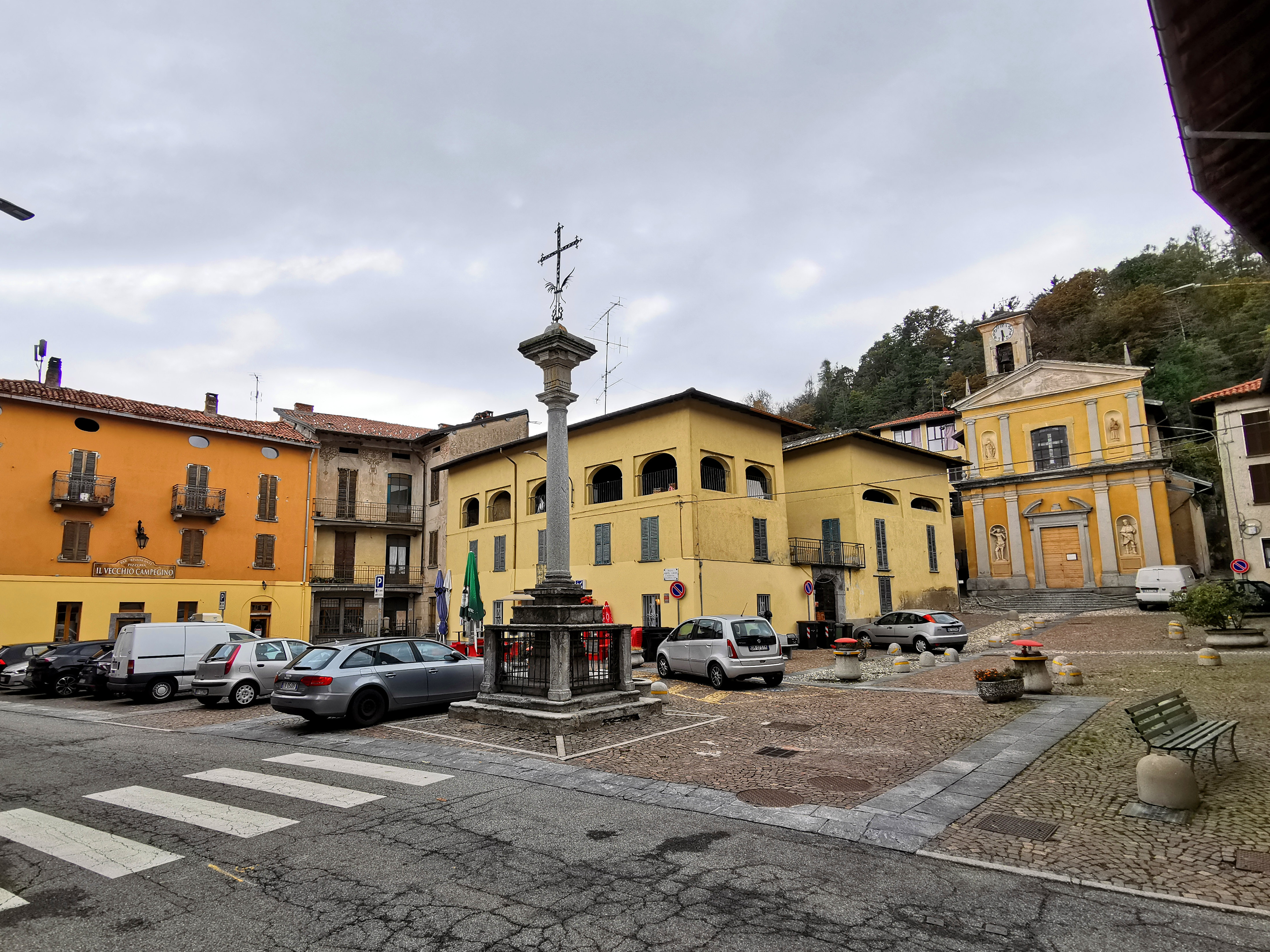
Piazza Dante Girani with the Church of Santi Rocco e Sebastiano
