= Marzio =

- Comune
- Comune di Marzio
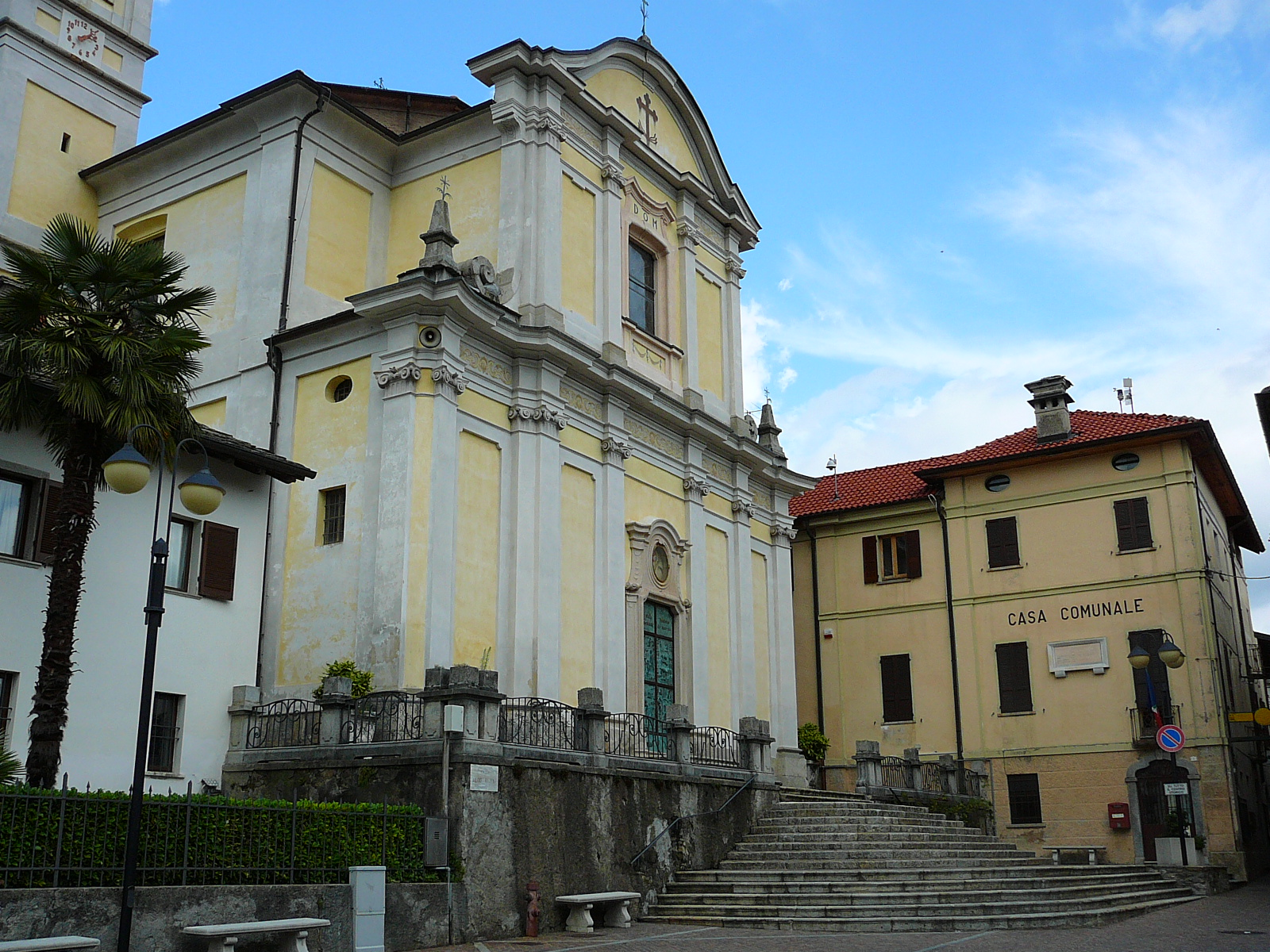

- Location within Italy Location within Lombardy
- Coordinates: 45°56′N 8°52′E
- Country: Italy
- Region: Lombardy
- Province: Province of Varese (VA)

Area
  - Total: 2.0 km^{2} (0.77 sq mi)

Population (Dec. 2004)
  - Total: 290
  - Density: 140/km^{2} (380/sq mi)
- Time zone: UTC+1 (CET)
  - Summer (DST): UTC+2 (CEST)
- Postal code: 21030
- Dialing code: 0332

Marzio is a comune (municipality) in the Province of Varese in the Italian region Lombardy, located about 60 kilometres (37 mi) northwest of Milan and about 13 kilometres (8 mi) north of Varese. The origin of the name "Marzio" could derive from the Latin name "Marcius" or it could refer to the Italian word "rotten". The council of Marzio covers an area of 1.98 kilometers^{2} Marzio borders the following municipalities: Brusimpiano, Cadegliano-Viconago, Cuasso al Monte, Lavena Ponte Tresa, Marchirolo; the territory of the Comune is comprised in the Cinque Vette Park.

== Demographic evolution ==
Historical population

| Year | Pop. | ±% |
|---|---|---|
| 1861 | 212 | — |
| 1871 | 190 | −10.4% |
| 1881 | 190 | +0.0% |
| 1901 | 202 | +6.3% |
| 1911 | 245 | +21.3% |

| Year | Pop. | ±% |
|---|---|---|
| 1921 | 244 | −0.4% |
| 1931 | 252 | +3.3% |
| 1936 | 249 | −1.2% |
| 1951 | 272 | +9.2% |
| 1961 | 249 | −8.5% |

| Year | Pop. | ±% |
|---|---|---|
| 1971 | 273 | +9.6% |
| 1981 | 255 | −6.6% |
| 1991 | 282 | +10.6% |
| 2001 | 287 | +1.8% |

Source: Data from ISTAT
