= Cadegliano-Viconago =

- Comune
- Comune di Cadegliano-Viconago
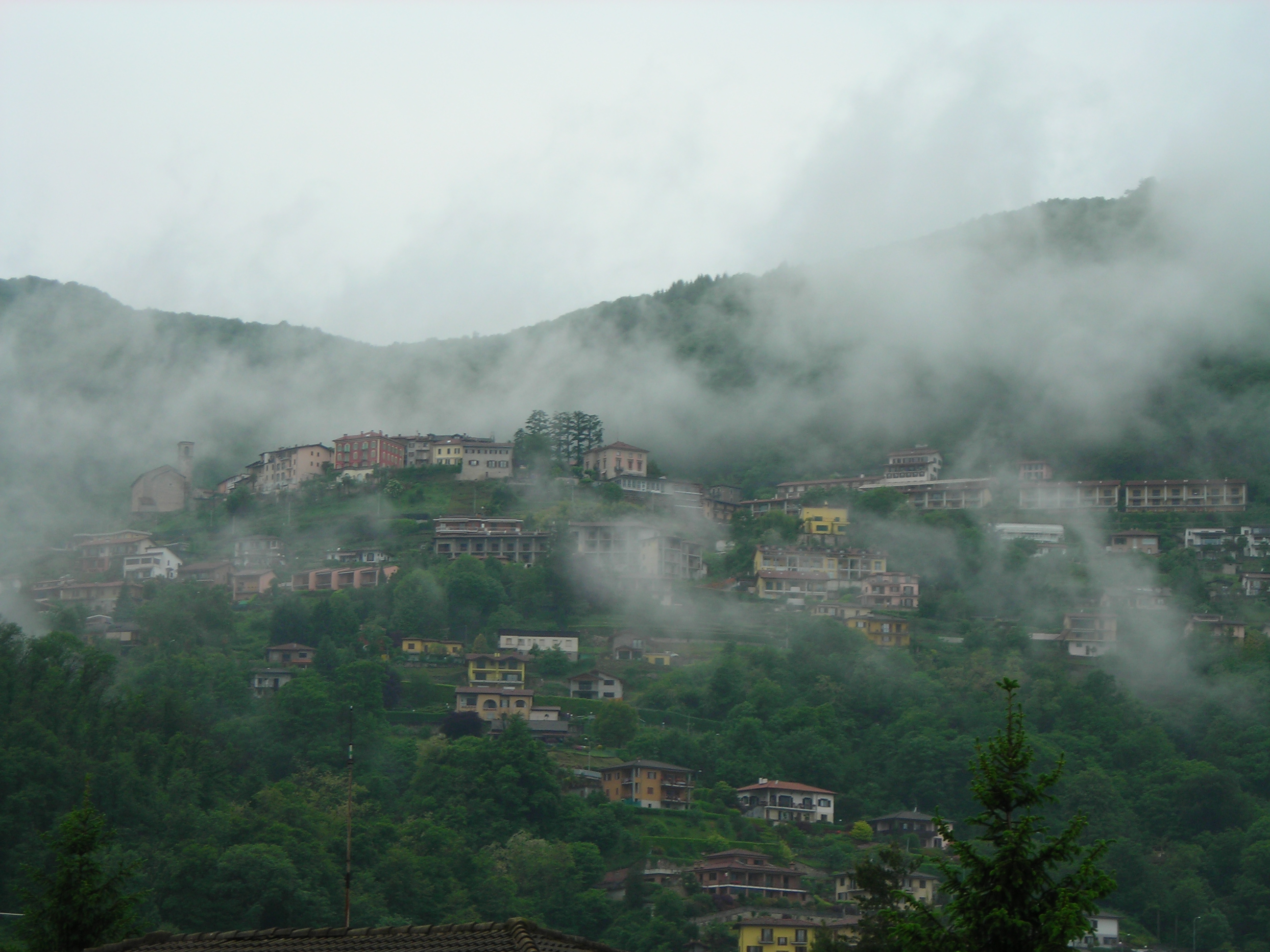

- Coat of arms

- Location within Italy Location within Lombardy
- Coordinates: 45°58′N 8°50′E
- Country: Italy
- Region: Lombardy
- Province: Province of Varese (VA)

Area
  - Total: 10.2 km^{2} (3.9 sq mi)

Population (Dec. 2004)
  - Total: 1,760
  - Density: 173/km^{2} (447/sq mi)
- Time zone: UTC+1 (CET)
  - Summer (DST): UTC+2 (CEST)
- Postal code: 21031
- Dialing code: 0332

Cadegliano-Viconago is a comune (municipality) in the Province of Varese in the Italian region Lombardy, located about 60 kilometres (37 mi) northwest of Milan and about 15 kilometres (9 mi) north of Varese, on the border with Switzerland. As of 31 December 2004, it had a population of 1,760 and an area of 10.2 square kilometres (3.9 mi^{2}).

Cadegliano-Viconago borders the following municipalities: Cremenaga, Croglio (Switzerland), Cugliate-Fabiasco, Lavena Ponte Tresa, Marchirolo, Marzio, Monteggio (Switzerland), Montegrino Valtravaglia.

Cadegliano-Viconago is the birthplace of Gian Carlo Menotti, two-time winner of the Pulitzer Prize.

== Demographic evolution ==
Historical population

| Year | Pop. | ±% |
|---|---|---|
| 1861 | 1,410 | — |
| 1871 | 1,384 | −1.8% |
| 1881 | 1,529 | +10.5% |
| 1901 | 1,482 | −3.1% |
| 1911 | 1,491 | +0.6% |

| Year | Pop. | ±% |
|---|---|---|
| 1921 | 1,360 | −8.8% |
| 1931 | 1,280 | −5.9% |
| 1936 | 1,273 | −0.5% |
| 1951 | 1,327 | +4.2% |
| 1961 | 1,609 | +21.3% |

| Year | Pop. | ±% |
|---|---|---|
| 1971 | 1,753 | +8.9% |
| 1981 | 1,783 | +1.7% |
| 1991 | 1,884 | +5.7% |
| 2001 | 1,774 | −5.8% |

Source: Data from ISTAT
