= Cassano Valcuvia =

- Comune
- Comune di Cassano Valcuvia
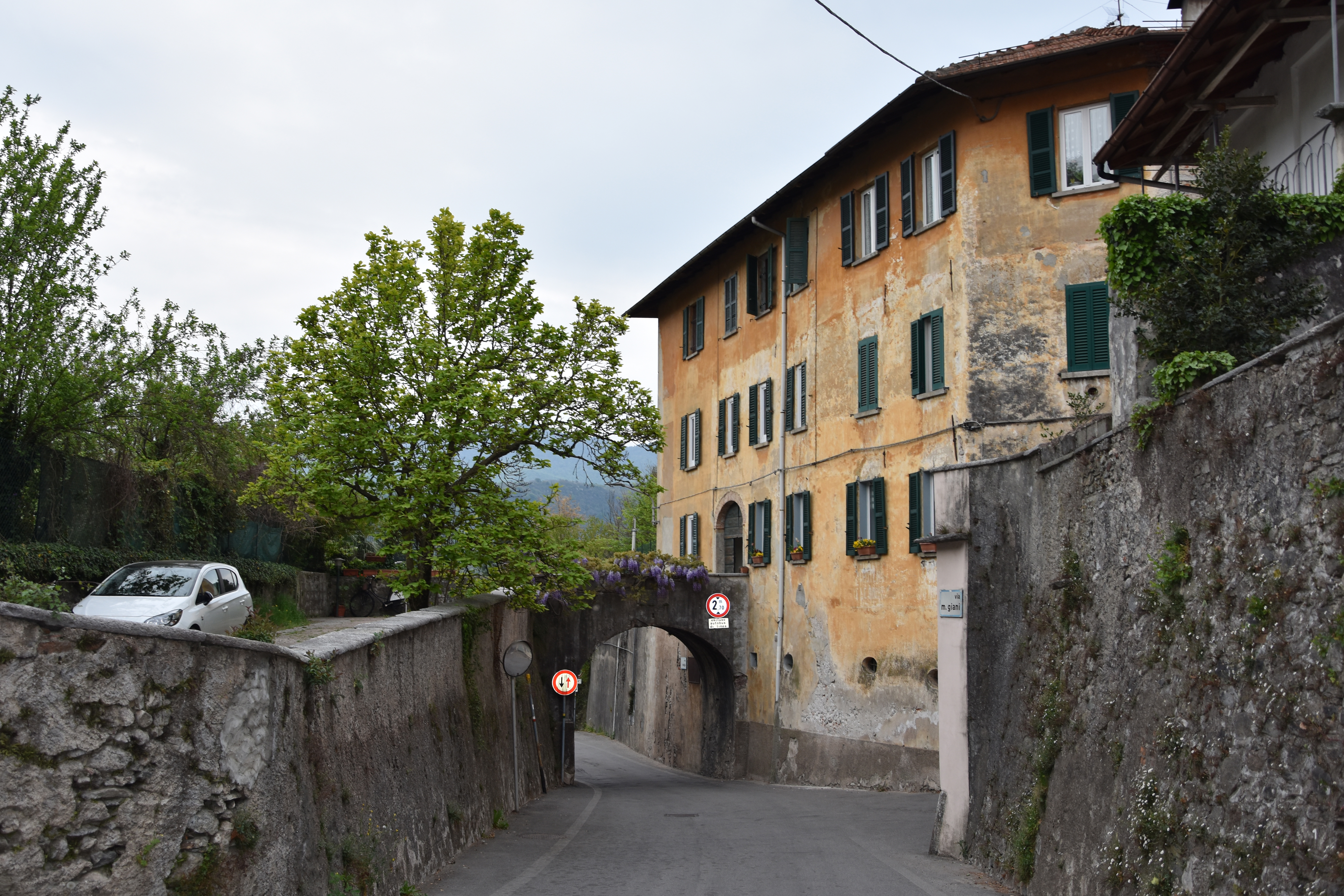

- Location within Italy Location within Lombardy
- Coordinates: 45°56′N 8°46′E
- Country: Italy
- Region: Lombardy
- Province: Varese (VA)

Government
  - Mayor: Marco Magrini

Area
  - Total: 3.95 km^{2} (1.53 sq mi)
- Elevation: 266 m (873 ft)

Population (31 May 2017)
  - Total: 668
  - Density: 169/km^{2} (438/sq mi)
- Demonym: Cassanesi
- Time zone: UTC+1 (CET)
  - Summer (DST): UTC+2 (CEST)
- Postal code: 21030
- Dialing code: 0332
- Website: Official website

Cassano Valcuvia is a comune (municipality) in the Province of Varese in the Italian region Lombardy, located about 60 kilometres (37 mi) northwest of Milan and about 14 kilometres (9 mi) northwest of Varese.

Cassano Valcuvia borders the following municipalities: Cuveglio, Duno, Ferrera di Varese, Grantola, Mesenzana, Rancio Valcuvia. The Italian tenor Aldo Bertocci lived in the town from 1974 until his death in 2004.
