= Castelveccana =

- Comune
- Comune di Castelveccana
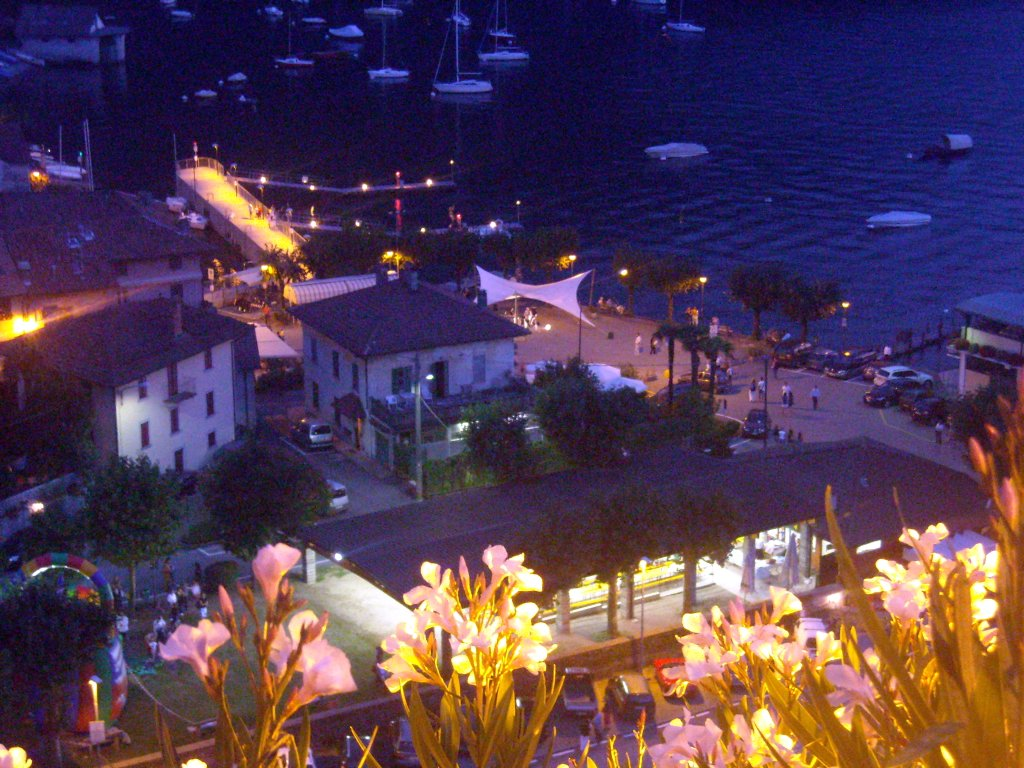

- Coat of arms

- Location within Italy Location within Lombardy
- Coordinates: 45°57′N 8°40′E
- Country: Italy
- Region: Lombardy
- Province: Varese (VA)
- Frazioni: Caldè, Nasca, Pessina, Ronchiano, Sant'Antonio, Sarigo, Castello, Orile, Pessina, Saltirana, Rasate, Bissaga, Biogno, Pianeggi, Pira, San Michele

Government
  - Mayor: Luciano Pezza

Area
  - Total: 20.79 km^{2} (8.03 sq mi)
- Elevation: 257 m (843 ft)

Population (31 December 2010)
  - Total: 2,032
  - Density: 97.74/km^{2} (253.1/sq mi)
- Demonym: Castelveccanesi
- Time zone: UTC+1 (CET)
  - Summer (DST): UTC+2 (CEST)
- Postal code: 21010
- Dialing code: 0332

Castelveccana is a comune (municipality) in the Province of Varese in the Italian region Lombardy, located about 70 kilometres (43 mi) northwest of Milan and about 20 kilometres (12 mi) northwest of Varese.

Castelveccana borders the following municipalities: Brenta, Casalzuigno, Cittiglio, Ghiffa, Laveno-Mombello, Oggebbio, Porto Valtravaglia.
