= Cugliate-Fabiasco =

- Comune
- Comune di Cugliate-Fabiasco
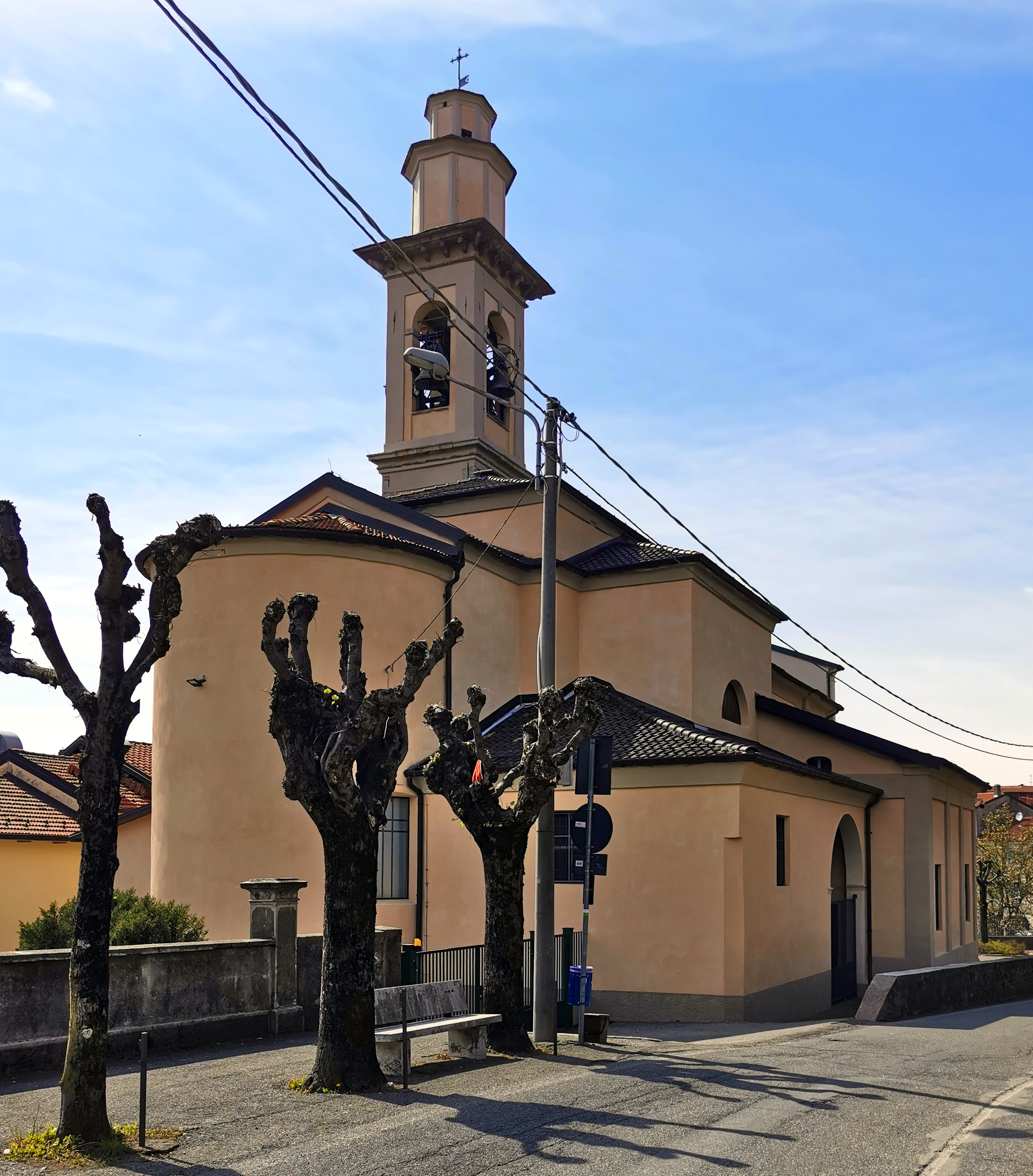
- Church of San Giulio

- Location within Italy Location within Lombardy
- Coordinates: 45°57′N 8°50′E
- Country: Italy
- Region: Lombardy
- Province: Province of Varese (VA)

Area
  - Total: 6.7 km^{2} (2.6 sq mi)
- Elevation: 516 m (1,693 ft)

Population (Dec. 2004)
  - Total: 2,961
  - Density: 440/km^{2} (1,100/sq mi)
- Demonym: Cugliatesi
- Time zone: UTC+1 (CET)
  - Summer (DST): UTC+2 (CEST)
- Postal code: 21030
- Dialing code: 0332

Cugliate-Fabiasco is a comune (municipality) in the Province of Varese in the Italian region Lombardy, located about 60 kilometres (37 mi) northwest of Milan and about 15 kilometres (9.3 mi) north of Varese. As of 31 December 2004, it had a population of 2,961 and an area of 6.7 square kilometres (2.6 mi^{2}).

Cugliate-Fabiasco borders the following municipalities: Cadegliano-Viconago, Cremenaga, Cuasso al Monte, Cunardo, Grantola, Marchirolo, Montegrino Valtravaglia, Valganna.

== Demographic evolution ==
Historical population

Year	Pop.	±%
1861	976	—
1871	1,193	+22.2%
1881	1,172	−1.8%
1901	1,049	−10.5%
1911	1,251	+19.3%

Year	Pop.	±%
1921	1,172	−6.3%
1931	1,018	−13.1%
1936	877	−13.9%
1951	1,017	+16.0%
1961	1,271	+25.0%

Year	Pop.	±%
1971	1,984	+56.1%
1981	2,490	+25.5%
1991	2,716	+9.1%
2001	2,805	+3.3%

Source: Data from ISTAT
