= Grantola =

- Comune
- Comune di Grantola
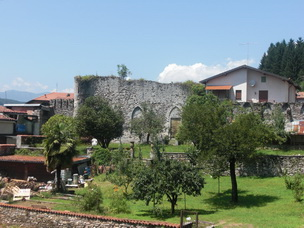

- Location within Italy Location within Lombardy
- Coordinates: 45°57′N 8°47′E
- Country: Italy
- Region: Lombardy
- Province: Varese (VA)
- Frazioni: Bellaria, Motta, Montebello, Vicema

Government
  - Mayor: Adriano Boscardin

Area
  - Total: 2.1 km^{2} (0.81 sq mi)
- Elevation: 250 m (820 ft)

Population (31 August 2017)
  - Total: 1,262
  - Density: 600/km^{2} (1,600/sq mi)
- Demonym: Grantolesi
- Time zone: UTC+1 (CET)
  - Summer (DST): UTC+2 (CEST)
- Postal code: 21030
- Dialing code: 0332
- Website: Official website

Grantola is a comune (municipality) in the Province of Varese in the Italian region Lombardy, located about 60 kilometres (37 mi) northwest of Milan and about 15 kilometres (9 mi) north of Varese.

The municipality of Grantola contains the frazioni (subdivisions, mainly villages and hamlets) Bellaria, Motta, Montebello, and Vicema.

Grantola borders the following municipalities: Cassano Valcuvia, Cugliate-Fabiasco, Cunardo, Ferrera di Varese, Mesenzana, Montegrino Valtravaglia.
