= Marchirolo =

- Comune
- Comune di Marchirolo
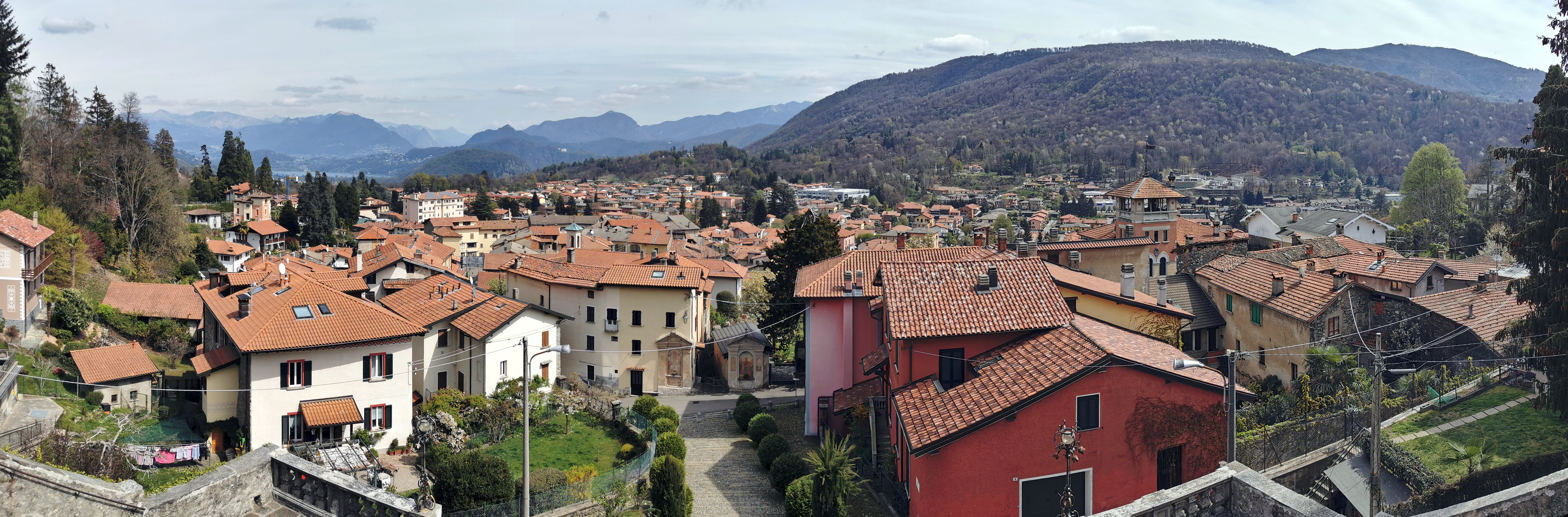
- View of Marchirolo

- Location within Italy Location within Lombardy
- Coordinates: 45°57′N 8°49′E
- Country: Italy
- Region: Lombardy
- Province: Province of Varese (VA)

Area
  - Total: 5.5 km^{2} (2.1 sq mi)
- Elevation: 500 m (1,600 ft)

Population (Dec. 2004)
  - Total: 3,355
  - Density: 610/km^{2} (1,600/sq mi)
- Demonym: Marchirolesi
- Time zone: UTC+1 (CET)
  - Summer (DST): UTC+2 (CEST)
- Postal code: 21030
- Dialing code: 0332

Marchirolo is a comune (municipality) in the Province of Varese in the Italian region Lombardy, located about 60 kilometres (37 mi) northwest of Milan and about 15 kilometres (9 mi) north of Varese. As of 31 December 2004, it had a population of 3,355 and an area of 5.5 square kilometres (2.1 mi^{2}).

Marchirolo borders the following municipalities: Cadegliano-Viconago, Cuasso al Monte, Cugliate-Fabiasco, Marzio.

== Demographic evolution ==
Historical population

Year	Pop.	±%
1861	825	—
1871	828	+0.4%
1881	868	+4.8%
1901	850	−2.1%
1911	867	+2.0%

Year	Pop.	±%
1921	860	−0.8%
1931	723	−15.9%
1936	728	+0.7%
1951	944	+29.7%
1961	1,045	+10.7%

Year	Pop.	±%
1971	1,861	+78.1%
1981	2,312	+24.2%
1991	2,875	+24.4%
2001	3,153	+9.7%

Source: Data from ISTAT
