= Lavena Ponte Tresa =

- Comune
- Comune di Lavena Ponte Tresa
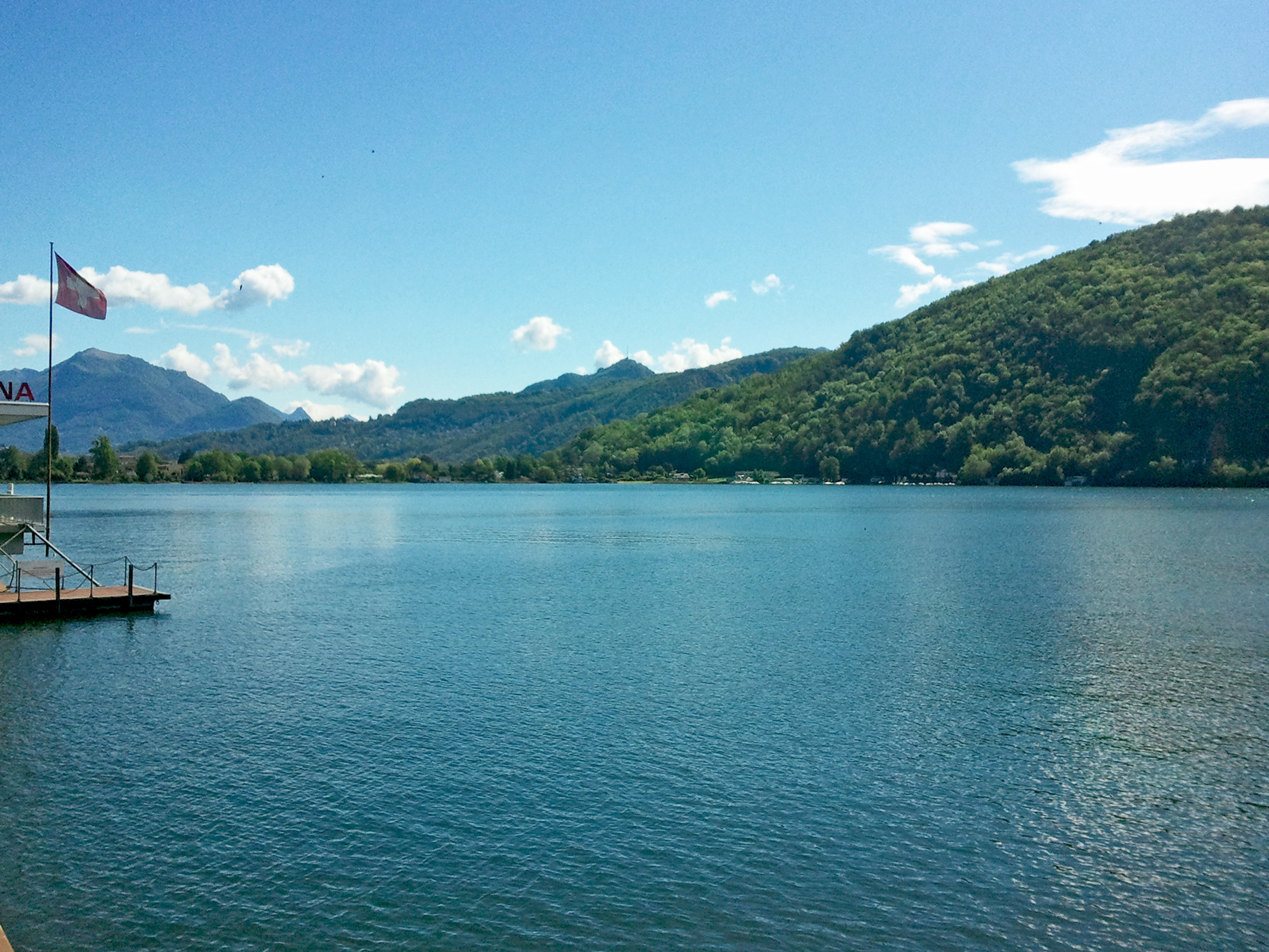

- Location within Italy Location within Lombardy
- Coordinates: 45°58′N 8°51′E
- Country: Italy
- Region: Lombardy
- Province: Varese (VA)

Government
  - Mayor: Massimo Mastromarino

Area
  - Total: 4.44 km^{2} (1.71 sq mi)
- Elevation: 275 m (902 ft)

Population (31 August 2017)
  - Total: 5,747
  - Density: 1,290/km^{2} (3,350/sq mi)
- Demonym(s): Lavenesi, Tresiani and Tresini
- Time zone: UTC+1 (CET)
  - Summer (DST): UTC+2 (CEST)
- Postal code: 21037
- Dialing code: 0332
- Website: Official website

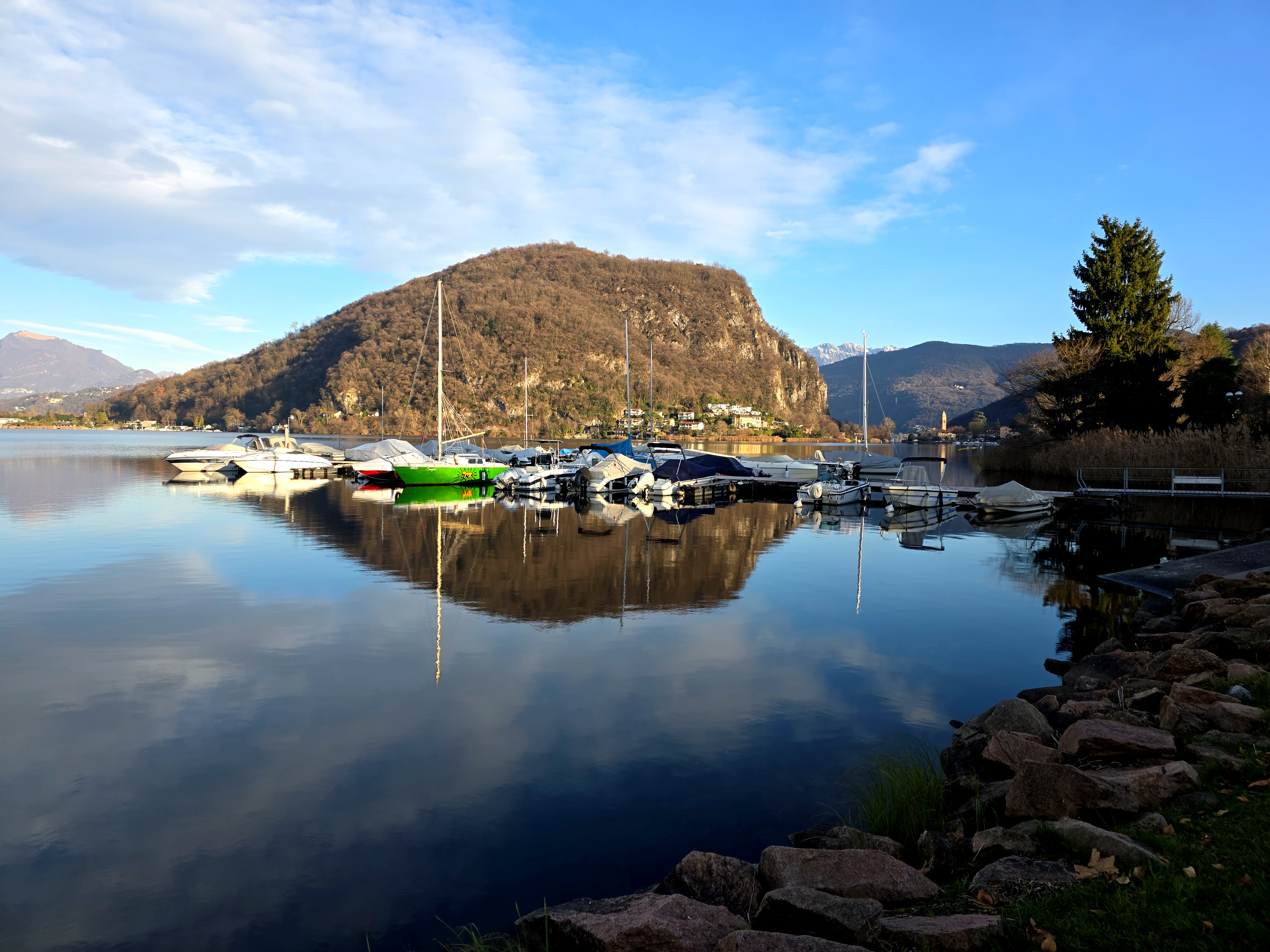
Lake Lugano and Mount Caslano

Lavena Ponte Tresa is a comune (municipality) on Lake Lugano in the Province of Varese in the Italian region Lombardy, located about 60 kilometres (37 mi) northwest of Milan and about 15 kilometres (9 mi) north of Varese, on the border with Switzerland.

Lavena Ponte Tresa borders the following municipalities: Brusimpiano, Cadegliano-Viconago, Caslano (Switzerland), Marzio, Tresa (Switzerland).

== History ==
Lavena Ponte Tresa has two distinct parts: Lavena, which is the historical origin of the municipality, and Ponte Tresa. Lavena includes the locality of Castello, which can be dated to around the 12th century, and the locality of Villa, which was formed around the first half of the 18th century. Ponte Tresa has much more recent origins, around 1846, after the construction of the bridge on the river which the town of Ponte Tresa straddles.

== Sister cities ==
- (Italy) Mesoraca
- (Italy) Lacedonia
- (Italy) Aquilonia
- (Italy) Calitri
