= Cremenaga =

- Comune
- Comune di Cremenaga
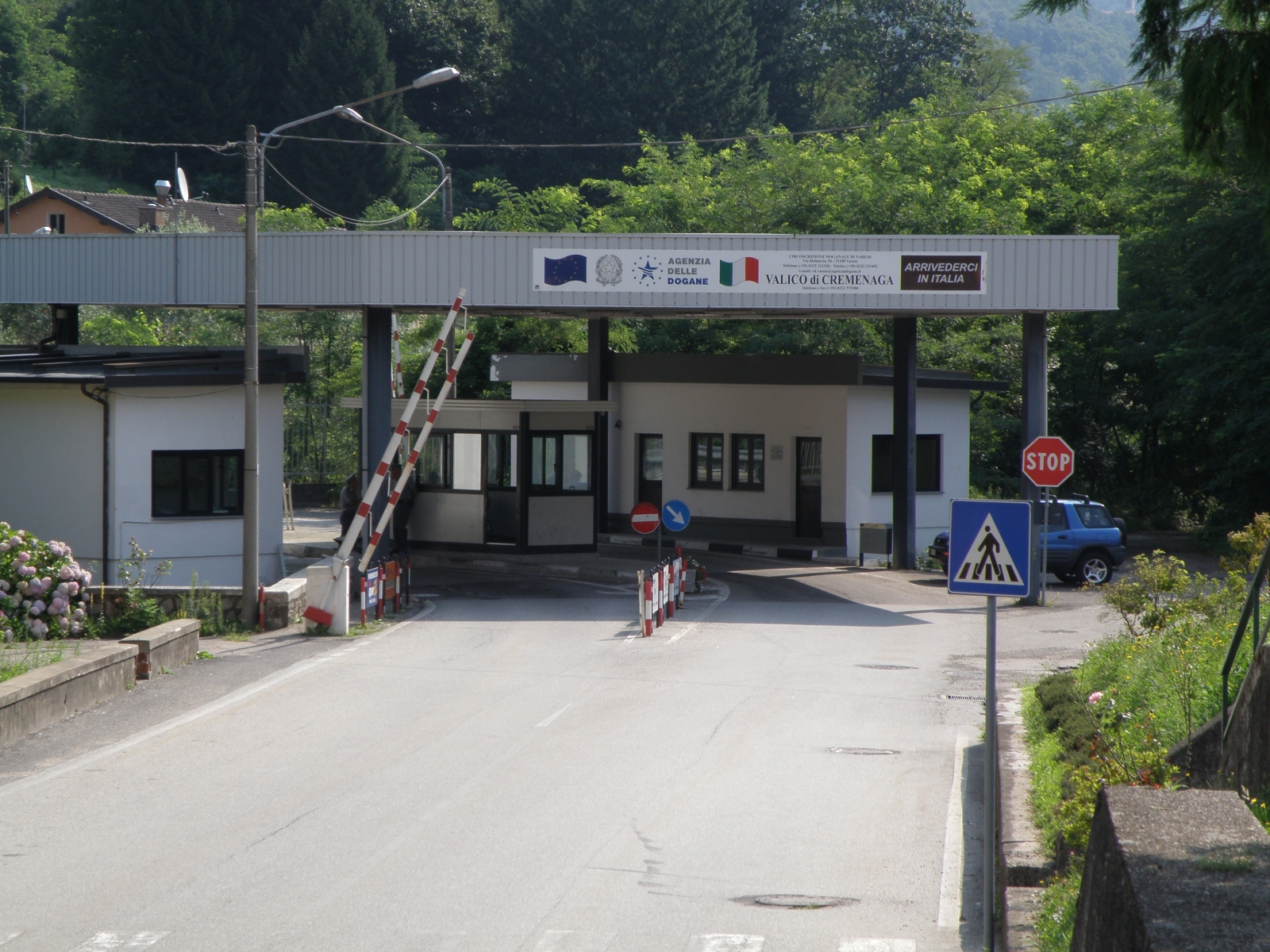

- Location within Italy Location within Lombardy
- Coordinates: 45°59′N 8°48′E
- Country: Italy
- Region: Lombardy
- Province: Province of Varese (VA)
- Frazioni: Sasso del Castello, Mirabello, Campagna, Monte Sette Termini (i Bedeloni), Cascina Porsù

Area
  - Total: 4.6 km^{2} (1.8 sq mi)
- Elevation: 281 m (922 ft)

Population (Dec. 2004)
  - Total: 780
  - Density: 170/km^{2} (440/sq mi)
- Demonym: Cremenaghesi
- Time zone: UTC+1 (CET)
  - Summer (DST): UTC+2 (CEST)
- Postal code: 21030
- Dialing code: 0332

Cremenaga is a comune (municipality) in the Province of Varese in the Italian region Lombardy, located about 60 kilometres (37 mi) northwest of Milan and about 20 kilometres (12 mi) north of Varese, on the border with Switzerland. As of 31 December 2004, it had a population of 780 and an area of 4.6 square kilometres (1.8 mi^{2}).

The municipality of Cremenaga contains the frazioni (subdivisions, mainly villages and hamlets) Sasso del Castello, Mirabello, Campagna, Monte Sette Termini (i Bedeloni), and Cascina Porsù.

Cremenaga borders the following municipalities: Cadegliano-Viconago, Cugliate-Fabiasco, Luino, Monteggio (Switzerland), Montegrino Valtravaglia.

== Demographic evolution ==
Historical population

Year	Pop.	±%
1861	347	—
1871	361	+4.0%
1881	379	+5.0%
1901	431	+13.7%
1911	429	−0.5%

Year	Pop.	±%
1921	442	+3.0%
1931	355	−19.7%
1936	358	+0.8%
1951	369	+3.1%
1961	455	+23.3%

Year	Pop.	±%
1971	626	+37.6%
1981	677	+8.1%
1991	800	+18.2%
2001	779	−2.6%

Source: Data from ISTAT
