= Azzio =

- Comune
- Comune di Azzio
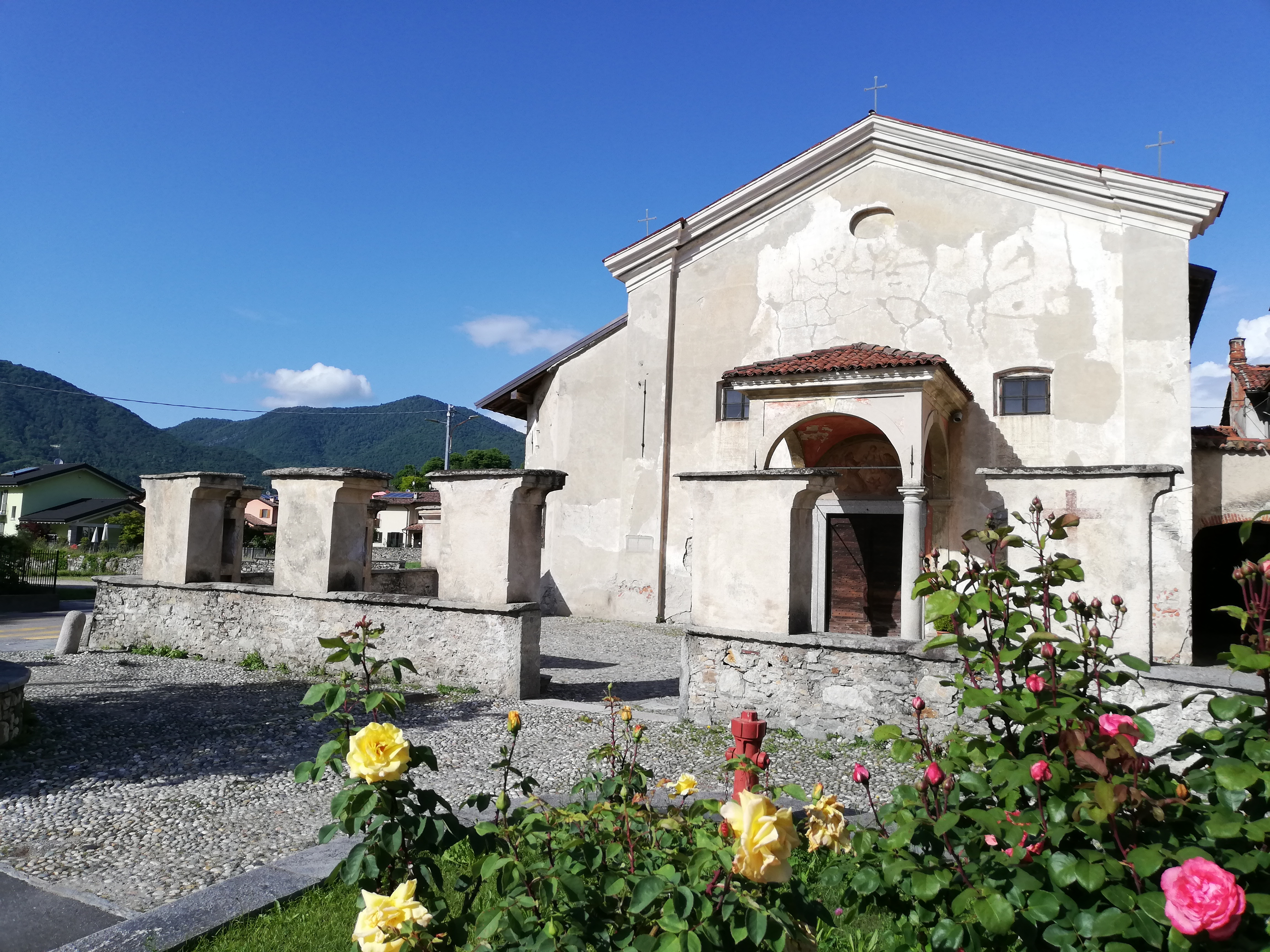
- The Church of Saint Anthony of Padua in Azzio.

- Coat of arms

- Location within Italy Location within Lombardy
- Coordinates: 45°53′N 08°42′E
- Country: Italy
- Region: Lombardy
- Province: Varese (VA)

Government
  - Mayor: Davide Vincenti (since May 27, 2019)

Area
  - Total: 2.17 km^{2} (0.84 sq mi)
- Elevation: 399 m (1,309 ft)

Population (2024)
  - Total: 770
  - Density: 350/km^{2} (920/sq mi)
- Demonym: Azziesi
- Time zone: UTC+1 (CET)
  - Summer (DST): UTC+2 (CEST)
- Postal code: 21030
- Dialing code: 0332
- Website: Official website

Azzio (Lombard: Asc) is a town and comune located in the province of Varese, in the Lombardy region of northern Italy.
