= Brissago-Valtravaglia =

- Comune
- Comune di Brissago-Valtravaglia
- Coat of arms

- Location within Italy Location within Lombardy
- Coordinates: 45°56′N 8°44′E
- Country: Italy
- Region: Lombardy
- Province: Varese (VA)
- Frazioni: Monte San Michele, Motto Inferiore, Motto Superiore, Novello, Roggiano

Government
  - Mayor: Giuseppa Giordano

Area
  - Total: 6.3 km^{2} (2.4 sq mi)
- Elevation: 429 m (1,407 ft)

Population (Dec. 2004)
  - Total: 1,193
  - Density: 190/km^{2} (490/sq mi)
- Demonym: Brissaghesi
- Time zone: UTC+1 (CET)
  - Summer (DST): UTC+2 (CEST)
- Postal code: 21030
- Dialing code: 0332
- Website: Official website

Brissago-Valtravaglia is a comune (municipality) in the Province of Varese in the Italian region Lombardy, located about 60 kilometres (37 mi) northwest of Milan and about 15 kilometres (9 mi) northwest of Varese.
