= Cuvio =

Cuvio Cüj (Lombard)
- Comune
- Comune di Cuvio
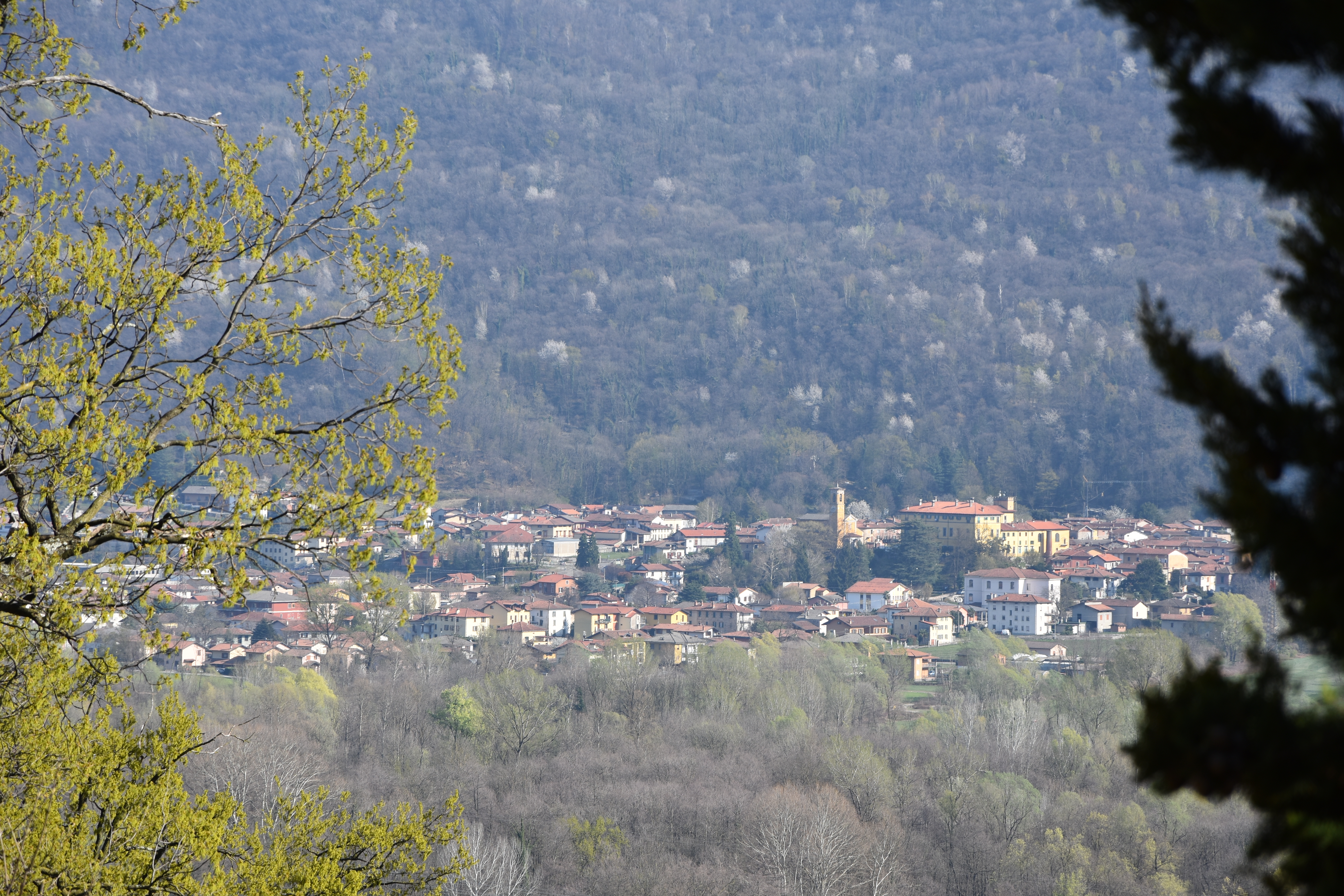

- Location within Italy Location within Lombardy
- Coordinates: 45°54′N 8°44′E
- Country: Italy
- Region: Lombardy
- Province: Varese (VA)
- Frazioni: Comacchio

Government
  - Mayor: Enzo Benedusi

Area
  - Total: 5.9 km^{2} (2.3 sq mi)
- Elevation: 309 m (1,014 ft)

Population (Dec. 2004)
  - Total: 1,610
  - Density: 270/km^{2} (710/sq mi)
- Demonym: Cuviesi
- Time zone: UTC+1 (CET)
  - Summer (DST): UTC+2 (CEST)
- Postal code: 21030
- Dialing code: 0332
- Website: Official website

Cuvio (Western Lombard: Cüj) is a comune (municipality) in the Province of Varese in the Italian region Lombardy, located about 60 kilometres (37 mi) northwest of Milan and about 12 kilometres (7 mi) northwest of Varese.

Cuvio borders the following municipalities: Azzio, Barasso, Casalzuigno, Castello Cabiaglio, Cocquio-Trevisago, Comerio, Cuveglio, Gavirate, Orino.
