= Rancio Valcuvia =

- Comune
- Comune di Rancio Valcuvia
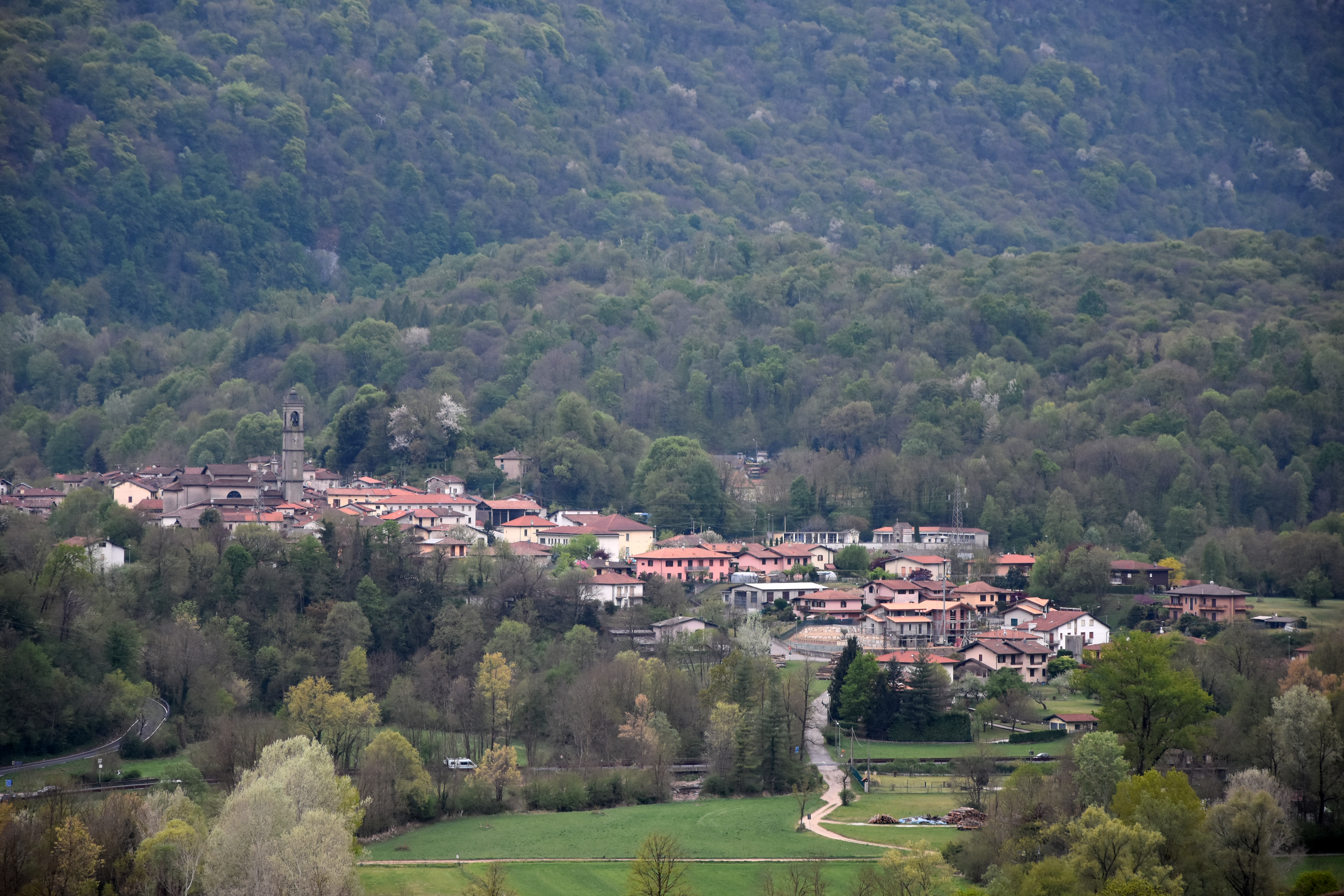

- Coat of arms

- Location within Italy Location within Lombardy
- Coordinates: 45°54′N 8°46′E
- Country: Italy
- Region: Lombardy
- Province: Varese (VA)
- Frazioni: Cantevria

Government
  - Mayor: Simone Eligio Castoldi

Area
  - Total: 4.45 km^{2} (1.72 sq mi)
- Elevation: 296 m (971 ft)

Population (31 December 2010)
  - Total: 940
  - Density: 210/km^{2} (550/sq mi)
- Demonym: Rancesi
- Time zone: UTC+1 (CET)
  - Summer (DST): UTC+2 (CEST)
- Postal code: 21030
- Dialing code: 0332
- Patron saint: Sts. Fabianus and Sebastian
- Saint day: January 20
- Website: Official website

Rancio Valcuvia is a comune (municipality) in the Province of Varese in the Italian region Lombardy, located about 60 kilometres (37 mi) northwest of Milan and about 11 kilometres (7 mi) northwest of Varese.

Rancio Valcuvia borders the following municipalities: Bedero Valcuvia, Brinzio, Cassano Valcuvia, Castello Cabiaglio, Cuveglio, Ferrera di Varese, Masciago Primo.

In terms of industry, the Torcitura di Rancio, a textile transformation industry, was formed as a joint venture between Montefibre, interested in the transformation of its yarns, and the Ratti group, interested in textile machinery aspects. The former twisting plant was then acquired by the Cumdi company of Germignaga.
