= Masciago Primo =

- Comune
- Comune di Masciago Primo
- Location within Italy Location within Lombardy
- Coordinates: 45°55′N 8°47′E
- Country: Italy
- Region: Lombardy
- Province: Province of Varese (VA)
- Frazioni: Località Mondada, Località Muniscione

Area
  - Total: 1.9 km^{2} (0.73 sq mi)
- Elevation: 347 m (1,138 ft)

Population (Dec. 2004)
  - Total: 289
  - Density: 150/km^{2} (390/sq mi)
- Demonym: Masciaghesi
- Time zone: UTC+1 (CET)
  - Summer (DST): UTC+2 (CEST)
- Postal code: 21030
- Dialing code: 0332
- Website: Official website

Masciago Primo is a comune (municipality) in the Province of Varese in the Italian region Lombardy, located about 60 km (37 mi) northwest of Milan and about 12 km (7.5 mi) northwest of Varese. As of 31 December 2004, it had a population of 289 and an area of 1.9 km^{2} (0.73 sq mi).

The municipality of Masciago Primo contains the frazioni (subdivisions, mainly villages and hamlets) Località Mondada and Località Muniscione.

Masciago Primo borders the following municipalities: Bedero Valcuvia, Cunardo, Ferrera di Varese, Rancio Valcuvia.

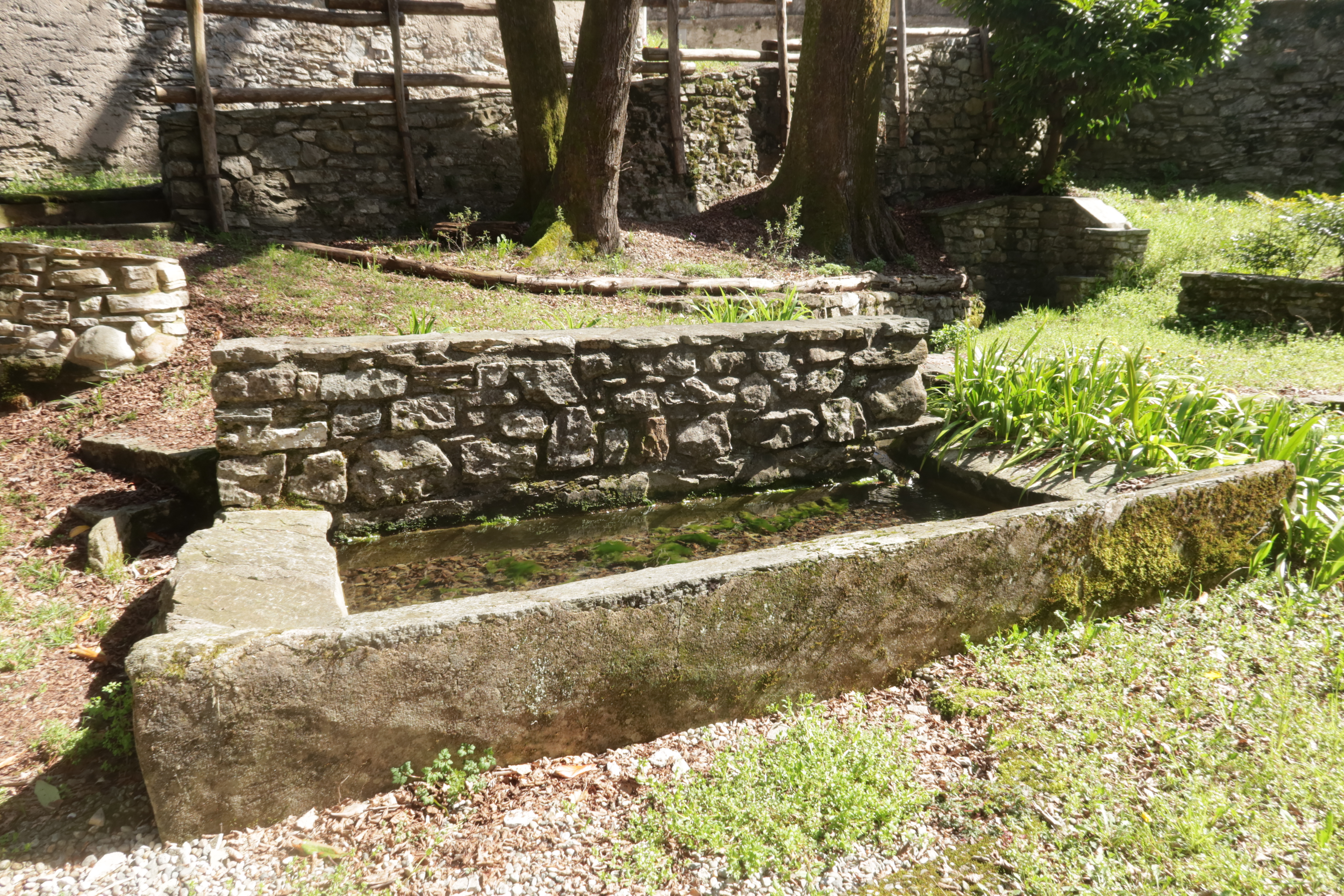
A wall in the village

== Demographic evolution ==
Historical population

Year	Pop.	±%
1861	257	—
1871	278	+8.2%
1881	296	+6.5%
1901	258	−12.8%
1911	271	+5.0%

Year	Pop.	±%
1921	221	−18.5%
1931	176	−20.4%
1936	159	−9.7%
1951	156	−1.9%
1961	179	+14.7%

Year	Pop.	±%
1971	157	−12.3%
1981	164	+4.5%
1991	188	+14.6%
2001	272	+44.7%

Source: Data from ISTAT
