= Luvinate =

- Comune
- Comune di Luvinate
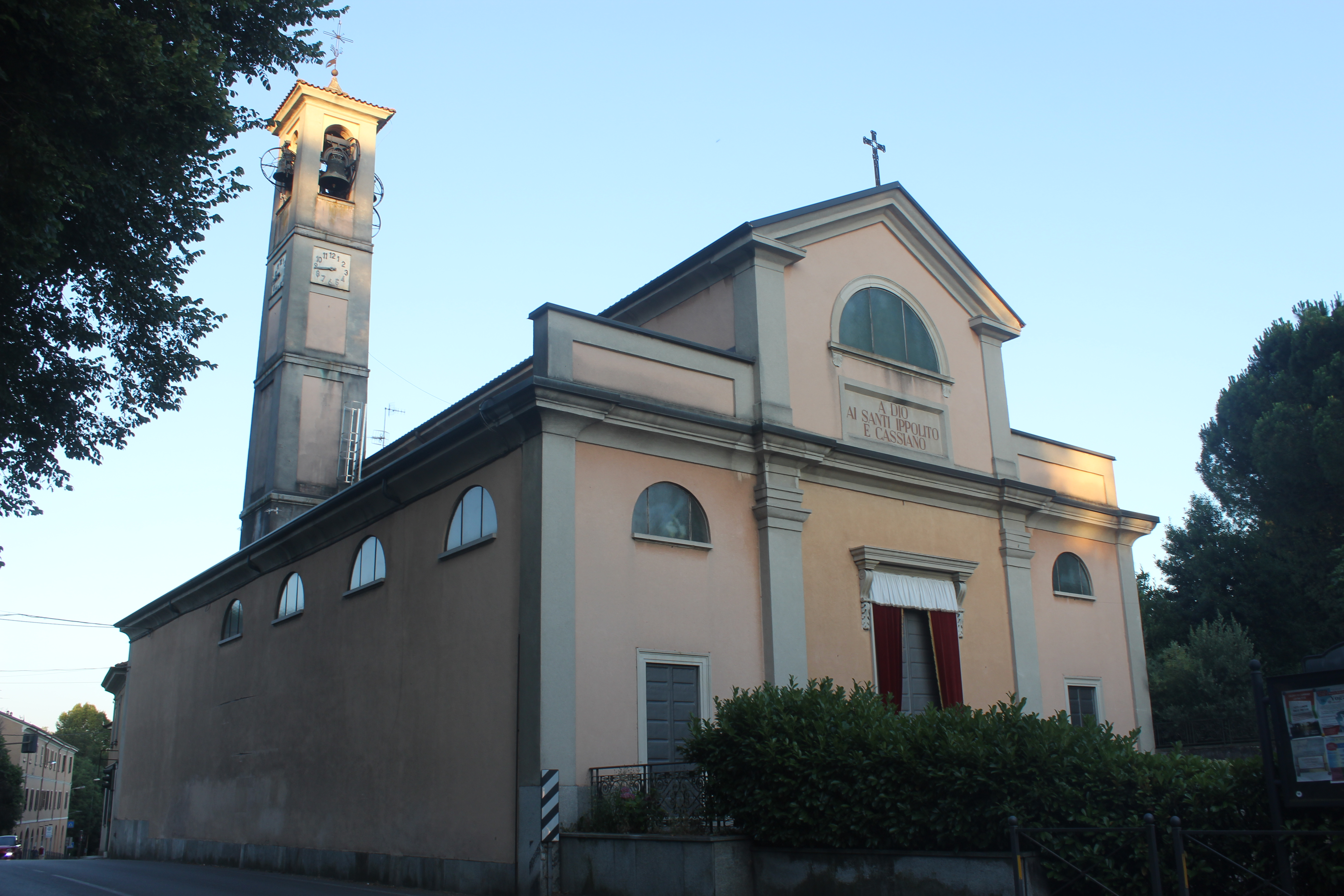

- Location within Italy Location within Lombardy
- Coordinates: 45°50′N 8°46′E
- Country: Italy
- Region: Lombardy
- Province: Province of Varese (VA)

Area
  - Total: 4.2 km^{2} (1.6 sq mi)

Population (Dec. 2004)
  - Total: 1,389
  - Density: 330/km^{2} (860/sq mi)
- Demonym: Luvinatesi
- Time zone: UTC+1 (CET)
  - Summer (DST): UTC+2 (CEST)
- Postal code: 21020
- Dialing code: 0332
- Website: Official website

Luvinate is a comune (municipality) in the Province of Varese in the Italian region Lombardy, located about 50 kilometres (31 mi) northwest of Milan and about 5 kilometres (3 mi) northwest of Varese. As of 31 December 2004, it had a population of 1,389 and an area of 4.2 square kilometres (1.6 mi^{2}).

Luvinate borders the following municipalities: Barasso, Casciago, Castello Cabiaglio, Varese.

== Demographic evolution ==
Historical population

Year	Pop.	±%
1861	604	—
1871	639	+5.8%
1881	672	+5.2%
1901	692	+3.0%
1911	788	+13.9%

Year	Pop.	±%
1921	842	+6.9%
1931	724	−14.0%
1936	678	−6.4%
1951	785	+15.8%
1961	810	+3.2%

Year	Pop.	±%
1971	1,104	+36.3%
1981	1,196	+8.3%
1991	1,282	+7.2%
2001	1,386	+8.1%

Source: Data from ISTAT
