= Bedero =

Bedero may refer to the following places in the Province of Varese, Italy:

- Bedero Valcuvia
- Brezzo di Bedero
