= Casciago =

- Comune
- Comune di Casciago
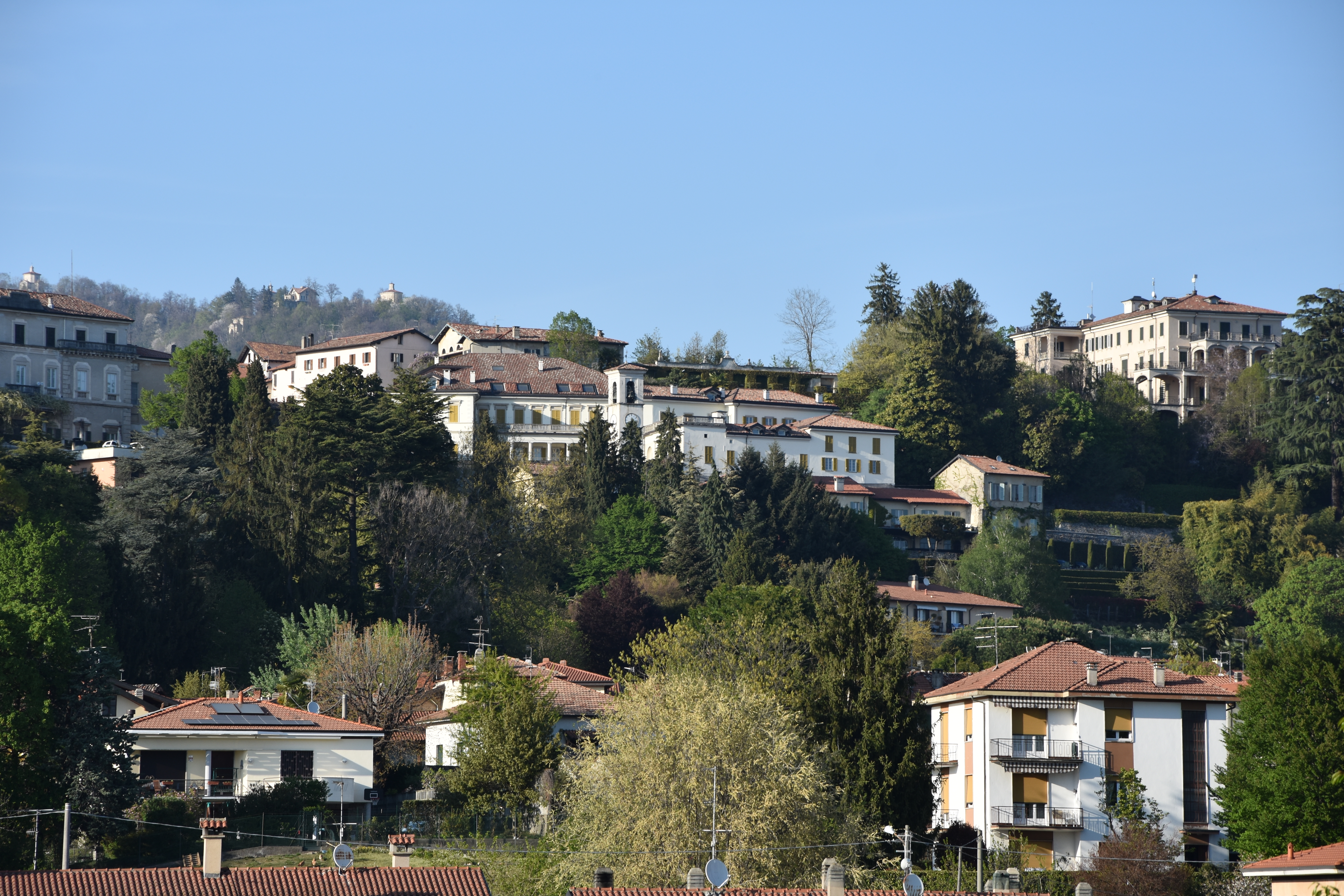

- Location within Italy Location within Lombardy
- Coordinates: 45°49′N 8°47′E
- Country: Italy
- Region: Lombardy
- Province: Province of Varese (VA)

Government
  - Mayor: Mirko Reto

Area
  - Total: 4.0 km^{2} (1.5 sq mi)

Population (Dec. 2021)
  - Total: 3,613
  - Density: 900/km^{2} (2,300/sq mi)
- Time zone: UTC+1 (CET)
  - Summer (DST): UTC+2 (CEST)
- Postal code: 21020
- Dialing code: 0332

Casciago is a comune (municipality) in the Province of Varese in the Italian region Lombardy, located about 50 kilometres (31 mi) northwest of Milan and about 4 kilometres (2 mi) west of Varese. As of 1 December 2021, it had a population of 3.613 and an area of 4.0 square kilometres (1.5 mi^{2}).

Casciago borders the following municipalities: Barasso, Gavirate, Luvinate, Varese.

Casciago could very well be the location of the ancient Cassiciacum, where Saint Augustine and a few friends lived together in a kind of philosophical commune after Augustine's conversion to Christianity.

== Demographic evolution ==
Historical population

| Year | Pop. | ±% |
|---|---|---|
| 1861 | 1,002 | — |
| 1871 | 1,000 | −0.2% |
| 1881 | 1,137 | +13.7% |
| 1901 | 1,286 | +13.1% |
| 1911 | 1,410 | +9.6% |

| Year | Pop. | ±% |
|---|---|---|
| 1921 | 1,325 | −6.0% |
| 1931 | 1,477 | +11.5% |
| 1936 | 1,460 | −1.2% |
| 1951 | 1,714 | +17.4% |
| 1961 | 2,165 | +26.3% |

| Year | Pop. | ±% |
|---|---|---|
| 1971 | 2,765 | +27.7% |
| 1981 | 3,206 | +15.9% |
| 1991 | 3,752 | +17.0% |
| 2001 | 4,019 | +7.1% |

Source: Data from ISTAT
