= Comerio =

- Comune
- Comune di Comerio
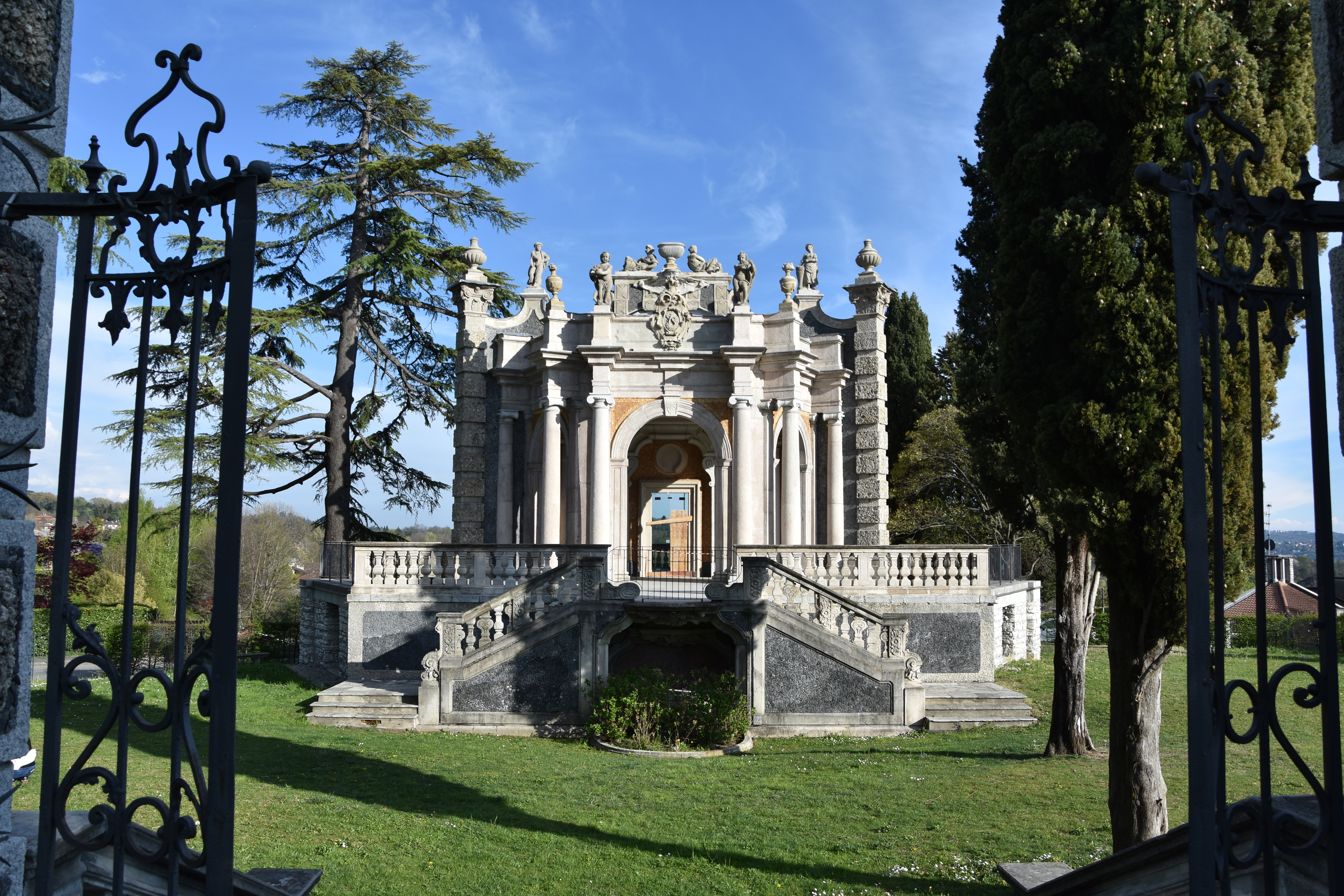

- Location within Italy Location within Lombardy
- Coordinates: 45°50′N 8°44′E
- Country: Italy
- Region: Lombardy
- Province: Province of Varese (VA)
- Frazioni: Muro, Orocco, Picco, Mattello, Cugnolo, Vigne

Area
  - Total: 5.6 km^{2} (2.2 sq mi)
- Elevation: 380 m (1,250 ft)

Population (Dec. 2004)
  - Total: 2,549
  - Density: 460/km^{2} (1,200/sq mi)
- Demonym: Comeriesi
- Time zone: UTC+1 (CET)
  - Summer (DST): UTC+2 (CEST)
- Postal code: 21025
- Dialing code: 0332
- Website: comune.comerio.va.it

Comerio is a comune (Municipality) in the Province of Varese in the Italian region Lombardy, located about 50 km (31 mi) northwest of Milan and about 8 km (5.0 mi) west of Varese. As of 31 December 2004, it had a population of 2,549 and an area of 5.6 km^{2} (2.2 sq mi).

The Municipality of Comerio contains the frazioni (subdivisions, mainly villages and hamlets) Muro, Orocco, Picco, Mattello, Cugnolo, and Vigne.

Comerio borders the following municipalities: Barasso, Castello Cabiaglio, Cuvio, Gavirate.

== Demographic evolution ==
Historical population

Year	Pop.	±%
1861	789	—
1871	878	+11.3%
1881	952	+8.4%
1901	1,186	+24.6%
1911	1,339	+12.9%

Year	Pop.	±%
1921	1,403	+4.8%
1931	1,303	−7.1%
1936	1,230	−5.6%
1951	1,491	+21.2%
1961	1,710	+14.7%

Year	Pop.	±%
1971	2,026	+18.5%
1981	2,017	−0.4%
1991	2,353	+16.7%
2001	2,352	−0.0%

Source: Data from ISTAT
