= Castello Cabiaglio =

- Comune
- Comune di Castello Cabiaglio
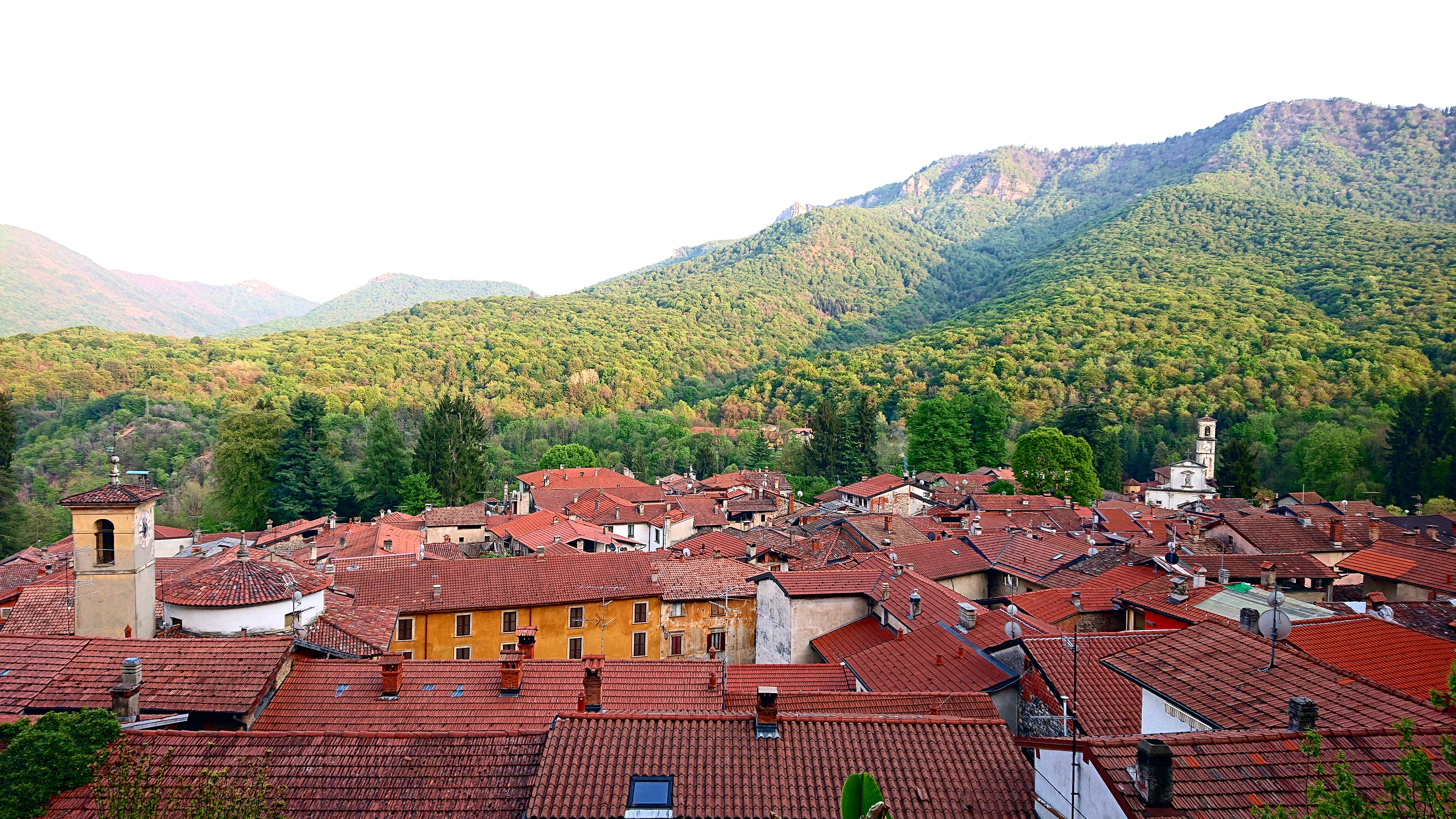

- Location within Italy Location within Lombardy
- Coordinates: 45°53′36″N 8°45′27″E
- Country: Italy
- Region: Lombardy
- Province: Province of Varese (VA)

Area
  - Total: 7.1 km^{2} (2.7 sq mi)

Population (Dec. 2004)
  - Total: 548
  - Density: 77/km^{2} (200/sq mi)
- Time zone: UTC+1 (CET)
  - Summer (DST): UTC+2 (CEST)
- Postal code: 21030
- Dialing code: 0332

Castello Cabiaglio is a comune (municipality) in the Province of Varese in the Italian region Lombardy, located about 60 kilometres (37 mi) northwest of Milan. As of 31 December 2004, it had a population of 548 and an area of 7.1 square kilometres (2.7 mi^{2}).

Castello Cabiaglio borders the following municipalities: Barasso, Brinzio, Comerio, Cuveglio, Cuvio, Luvinate, Rancio Valcuvia, Varese.

== Demographic evolution ==
Historical population

Year	Pop.	±%
1861	533	—
1871	560	+5.1%
1881	604	+7.9%
1901	623	+3.1%
1911	655	+5.1%

Year	Pop.	±%
1921	599	−8.5%
1931	542	−9.5%
1936	461	−14.9%
1951	458	−0.7%
1961	416	−9.2%

Year	Pop.	±%
1971	382	−8.2%
1981	384	+0.5%
1991	444	+15.6%
2001	503	+13.3%

Source: Data from ISTAT
