= Gavirate =

- Comune
- Comune di Gavirate
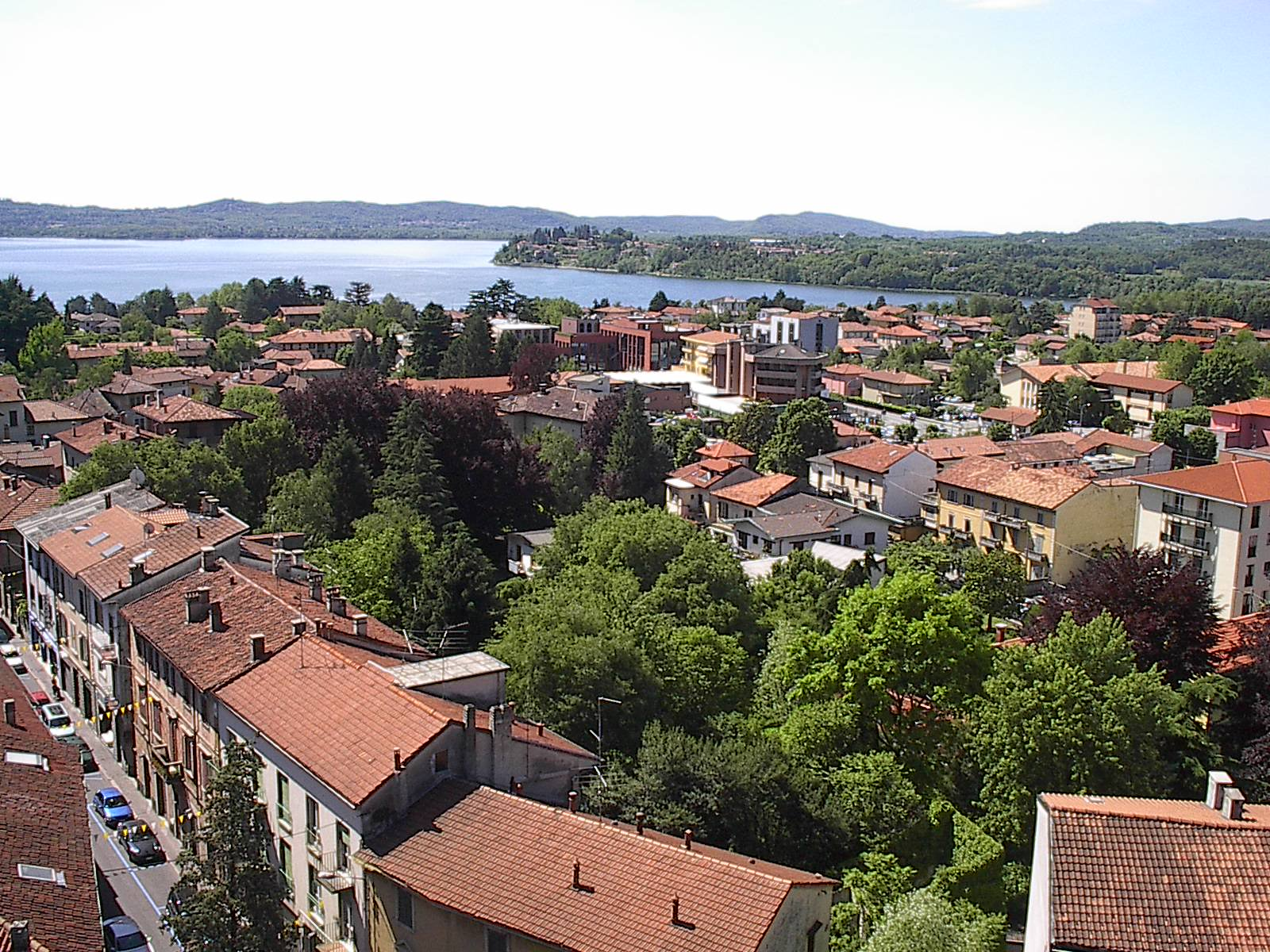

- Coat of arms

- Location within Italy Location within Lombardy
- Coordinates: 45°51′N 8°43′E
- Country: Italy
- Region: Lombardy
- Province: Province of Varese (VA)
- Frazioni: Oltrona al Lago, Voltorre

Government
  - Mayor: Massimo Parola (Ind.)

Area
  - Total: 13.3 km^{2} (5.1 sq mi)
- Elevation: 261 m (856 ft)

Population (Dec. 2004)
  - Total: 9,438
  - Density: 710/km^{2} (1,840/sq mi)
- Demonym: Gaviratesi
- Time zone: UTC+1 (CET)
  - Summer (DST): UTC+2 (CEST)
- Postal code: 21026
- Dialing code: 0332
- Website: Official website

Gavirate is a comune (municipality) in the province of Varese, in the Italian region of Lombardy, located about 60 kilometres (37 mi) northwest of Milan and about 10 kilometres (6 mi) northwest of Varese. As of 31 December 2004, it had a population of 9,438 and an area of 13.3 square kilometres (5.1 mi^{2}).

The comune of Gavirate contains the frazioni (hamlets) Oltrona al Lago, Voltorre and other mainly villages: Groppello, Le Vigne, Fignano, Forte di Orino, Fienile delle Pianezze, Armino, Pozzuolo, Cual, Ca'de Monti, Ronco, and Benedetto.

Gavirate borders the following comuni: Barasso, Bardello con Malgesso e Bregano, Besozzo, Biandronno, Casciago, Cocquio-Trevisago, Comerio, Cuvio, Varese.

== Demographic evolution ==
Historical population

Year	Pop.	±%
1861	2,700	—
1871	2,839	+5.1%
1881	3,268	+15.1%
1901	3,901	+19.4%
1911	4,172	+6.9%

Year	Pop.	±%
1921	4,344	+4.1%
1931	4,174	−3.9%
1936	4,108	−1.6%
1951	5,084	+23.8%
1961	6,542	+28.7%

Year	Pop.	±%
1971	8,271	+26.4%
1981	9,119	+10.3%
1991	9,108	−0.1%
2001	9,400	+3.2%

Source: Data from ISTAT
