= Brinzio =

- Comune
- Comune di Brinzio
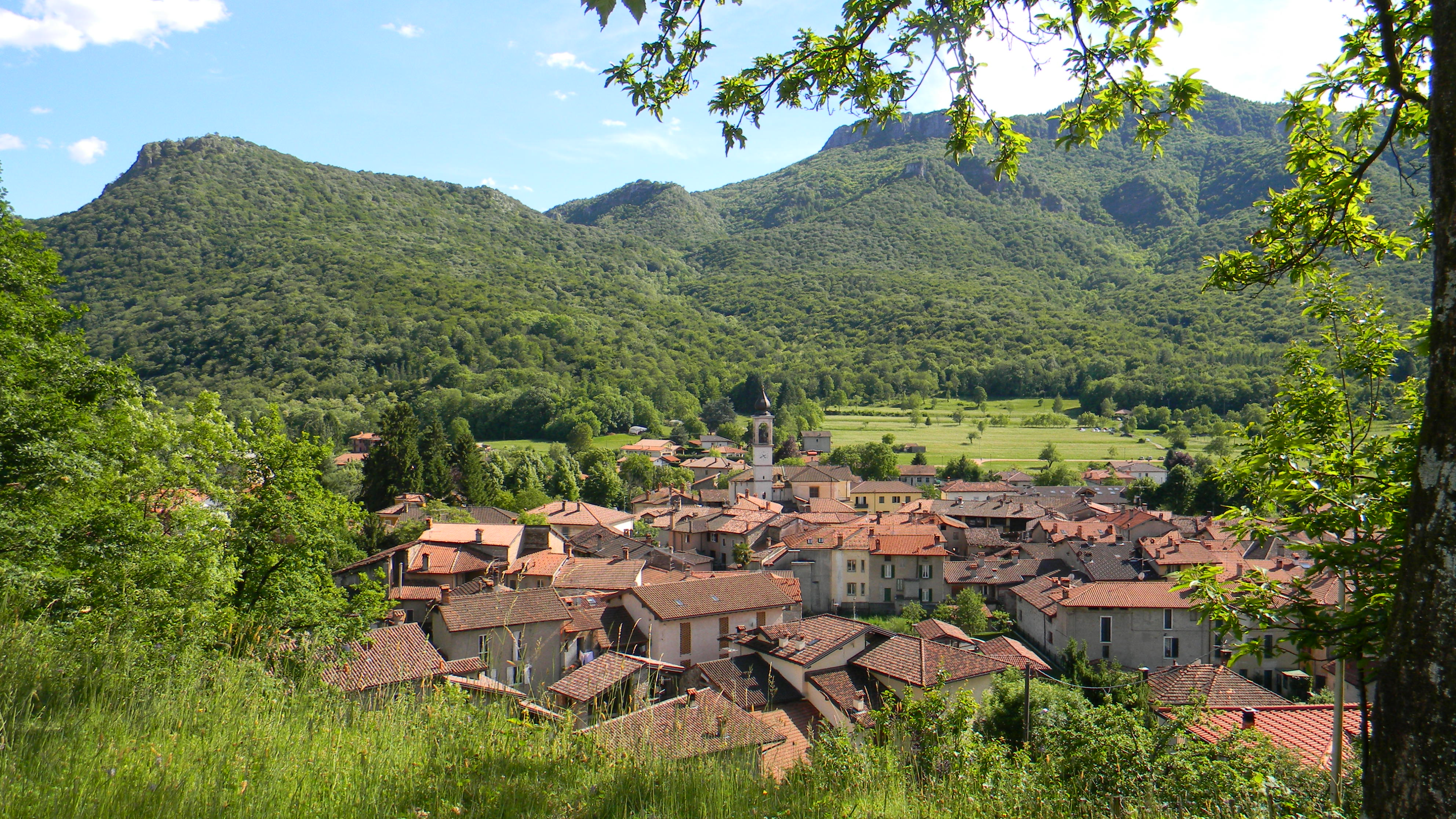
- Panorama of Brinzio

- Coat of arms

- Location within Italy Location within Lombardy
- Coordinates: 45.8882649°N 8.7901268°E
- Country: Italy
- Region: Lombardy
- Province: Province of Varese (VA)

Government
  - Mayor: Sergio Vanini ("Brinzio" Autonomous Party)

Area
  - Total: 6.4 km^{2} (2.5 sq mi)
- Elevation: 510 m (1,670 ft)

Population (Dec. 2004)
  - Total: 862
  - Density: 130/km^{2} (350/sq mi)
- Demonym: Brinziesi
- Time zone: UTC+1 (CET)
  - Summer (DST): UTC+2 (CEST)
- Postal code: 21030
- Dialing code: 0332
- Patron saint: Saint Peter and Saint Paul
- Saint day: 29 June
- Website: Official website

Brinzio is a comune (municipality) in the Province of Varese in the Italian region Lombardy, located about 60 kilometres (37 mi) northwest of Milan and about 8 kilometres (5 mi) northwest of Varese. As of 31 December 2004, it had a population of 862 and an area of 6.4 square kilometres (2.5 mi^{2}).

Brinzio borders the following municipalities: Bedero Valcuvia, Castello Cabiaglio, Induno Olona, Rancio Valcuvia, Valganna, Varese.

== Demographic evolution ==
Historical population

Year	Pop.	±%
1861	565	—
1871	503	−11.0%
1881	532	+5.8%
1901	587	+10.3%
1911	559	−4.8%

Year	Pop.	±%
1921	541	−3.2%
1931	492	−9.1%
1936	421	−14.4%
1951	516	+22.6%
1961	527	+2.1%

Year	Pop.	±%
1971	606	+15.0%
1981	630	+4.0%
1991	731	+16.0%
2001	804	+10.0%

Source: Data from ISTAT

== International relations ==
=== Twin towns – Sister cities ===
Brinzio is twinned with:

- Chaux, France (2013).
