= Cunardo =

- Comune
- Comune di Cunardo
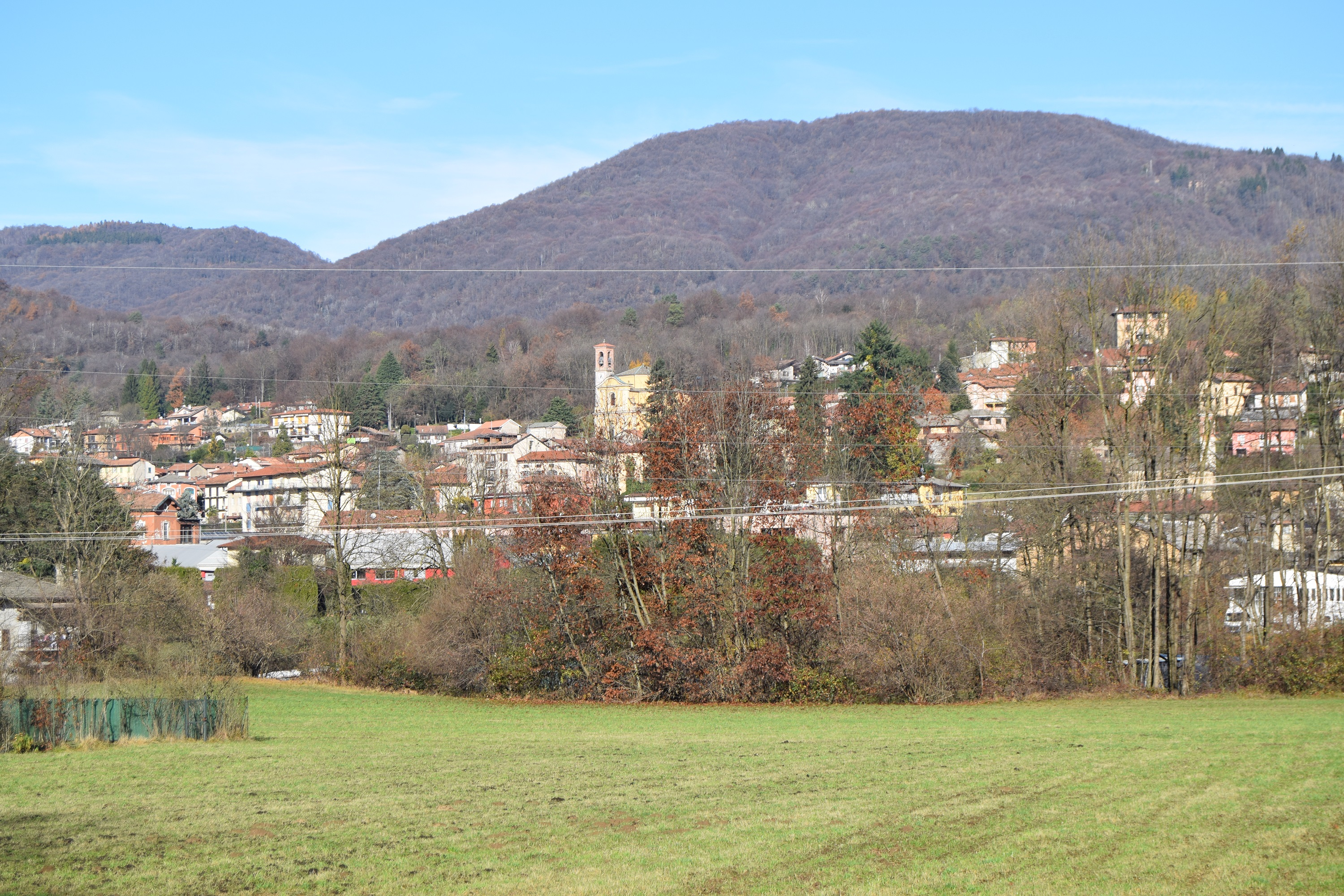

- Coat of arms

- Location within Italy Location within Lombardy
- Coordinates: 45°56′15″N 8°48′09″E
- Country: Italy
- Region: Lombardy
- Province: Varese (VA)
- Frazioni: Camadrino, Raglio

Government
  - Mayor: Angelo Morisi

Area
  - Total: 6.06 km^{2} (2.34 sq mi)
- Elevation: 450 m (1,480 ft)

Population (28 February 2017)
  - Total: 2,967
  - Density: 490/km^{2} (1,270/sq mi)
- Demonym: Cunardesi
- Time zone: UTC+1 (CET)
  - Summer (DST): UTC+2 (CEST)
- Postal code: 21035
- Dialing code: 0332
- Patron saint: St. Abbondio
- Saint day: August 31

Cunardo is a comune (municipality) in the Province of Varese in the Italian region Lombardy, located about 60 kilometres (37 mi) northwest of Milan and about 13 kilometres (8 mi) north of Varese.

Cunardo borders the following municipalities: Bedero Valcuvia, Cugliate-Fabiasco, Ferrera di Varese, Grantola, Masciago Primo, Valganna.

== Demographic evolution ==
Historical population

Year	Pop.	±%
1861	1,151	—
1871	1,284	+11.6%
1881	1,386	+7.9%
1901	1,239	−10.6%
1911	1,401	+13.1%

Year	Pop.	±%
1921	1,301	−7.1%
1931	1,271	−2.3%
1936	1,186	−6.7%
1951	1,310	+10.5%
1961	1,547	+18.1%

Year	Pop.	±%
1971	2,001	+29.3%
1981	2,135	+6.7%
1991	2,381	+11.5%
2001	2,549	+7.1%

Source: Data from ISTAT
