= Cocquio-Trevisago =

Cocquio-Trevisago Coeuch-Trevisagh (Lombard)
- Comune
- Comune di Cocquio-Trevisago
- Coat of arms

- Location within Italy Location within Lombardy
- Coordinates: 45°51′N 8°41′E
- Country: Italy
- Region: Lombardy
- Province: Province of Varese (VA)

Government
  - Mayor: Danilo Centrella

Area
  - Total: 9.6 km^{2} (3.7 sq mi)

Population (Dec. 2004)
  - Total: 4,701
  - Density: 490/km^{2} (1,300/sq mi)
- Time zone: UTC+1 (CET)
  - Summer (DST): UTC+2 (CEST)
- Postal code: 21034
- Dialing code: 0332

Cocquio-Trevisago (Italian: [ˈkɔkkwjo treviˈzaːɡo]; Varesino: Coeuch-Trevisagh [ˈkøːk treʋiˈzaːk]) is a comune (municipality) in the Province of Varese in the Italian region of Lombardy, located about 60 kilometres (37 mi) northwest of Milan and about 12 kilometres (7 mi) northwest of Varese. As of 31 December 2004 it had a population of 4,701 and an area of 9.6 square kilometres (3.7 mi^{2}).

Cocquio-Trevisago borders the following municipalities: Azzio, Besozzo, Cuvio, Gavirate, Gemonio, Orino.

== Monuments and places of interests ==
The main monuments present are:

- The Church of the Purification of the Virgin Mary which contains the painting by Pietro Gilardi, that portrays Saint Augustine, Saint Jerome, and Saint Teresa.
- Military towers, in the fraction of Trevisago is present the remains of a tower from the 11th century, it was used by the local militias to control the exchange of commodities and people. Furthermore, the militias uses the tower for transmitting danger signals with the use of brazier, to the other militias present in the territory.
- Villa of De Maddalena Schiroli, it was one of the administrative headquarters during the Kingdom of Lombardy. The villa has a shape of a "U" one of the main feature is the porch with the presents of marble columns who supports the arches. Because of this particularity the villa is dated back to the eighteenth century.

== Demographic evolution ==
Historical population

Year	Pop.	±%
1861	2,196	—
1871	2,400	+9.3%
1881	2,591	+8.0%
1901	2,833	+9.3%
1911	3,003	+6.0%

Year	Pop.	±%
1921	3,054	+1.7%
1931	2,733	−10.5%
1936	2,314	−15.3%
1951	2,848	+23.1%
1961	3,448	+21.1%

Year	Pop.	±%
1971	4,378	+27.0%
1981	4,707	+7.5%
1991	4,599	−2.3%
2001	4,600	+0.0%

Source: Data from ISTAT
