= Ferrera di Varese =

- Comune
- Comune di Ferrera di Varese
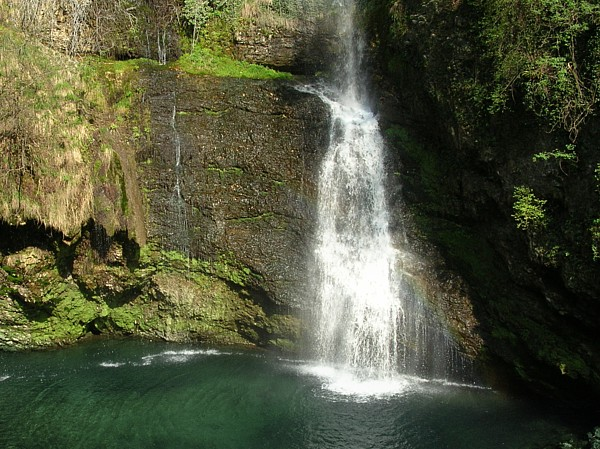

- Coat of arms

- Location within Italy Location within Lombardy
- Coordinates: 45°56′N 8°47′E
- Country: Italy
- Region: Lombardy
- Province: Varese (VA)
- Frazioni: Mondiscia

Government
  - Mayor: Marina Salardi

Area
  - Total: 1.53 km^{2} (0.59 sq mi)
- Elevation: 299 m (981 ft)

Population (31 July 2017)
  - Total: 716
  - Density: 468/km^{2} (1,210/sq mi)
- Demonym: Ferreresi
- Time zone: UTC+1 (CET)
  - Summer (DST): UTC+2 (CEST)
- Postal code: 21030
- Dialing code: 0332

Ferrera di Varese is a comune (municipality) in the Province of Varese in the Italian region Lombardy, located about 60 kilometres (37 mi) northwest of Milan and about 14 kilometres (9 mi) northwest of Varese.

Ferrera di Varese borders the following municipalities: Cassano Valcuvia, Cunardo, Grantola, Masciago Primo, Rancio Valcuvia.

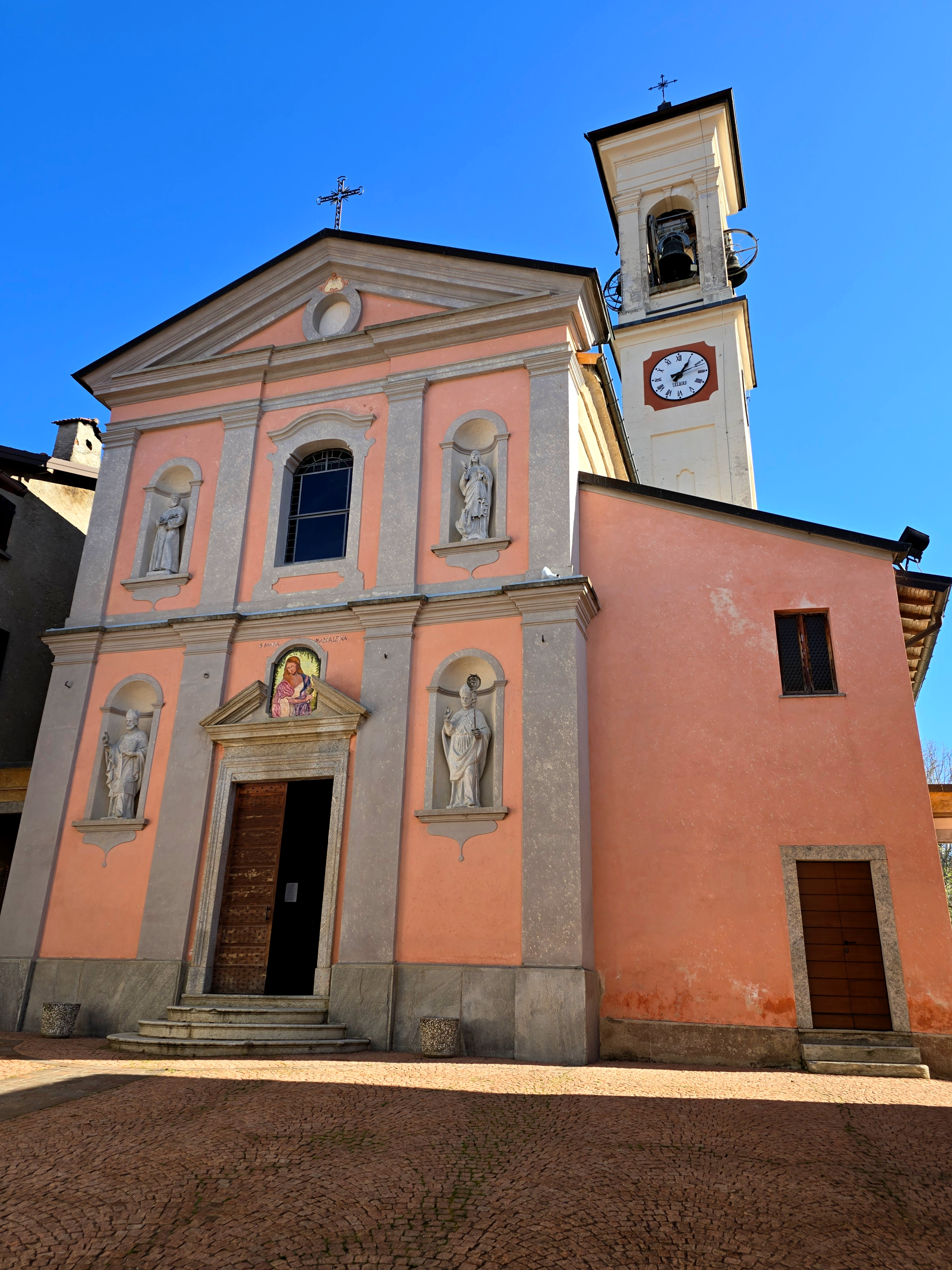
The church of Santa Maria Maddalena
