= Chaux, Territoire de Belfort =

Chaux
- Commune
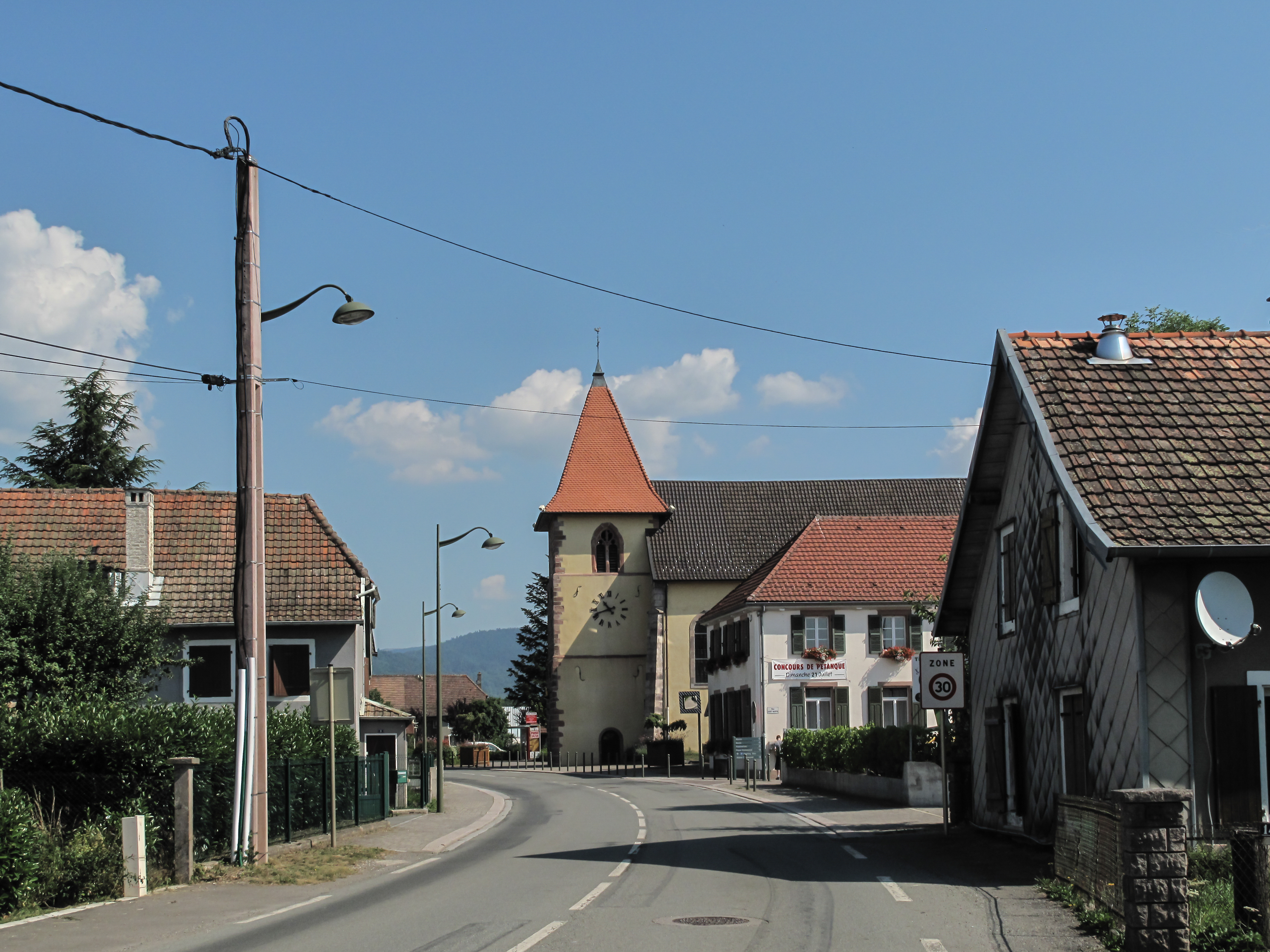
- Church of Saint-Martin in the street in Chaux
- Location of Chaux
- Location within France Location within Bourgogne-Franche-Comté
- Coordinates: 47°42′23″N 6°50′18″E
- Country: France
- Region: Bourgogne-Franche-Comté
- Department: Territoire de Belfort
- Arrondissement: Belfort
- Canton: Giromagny

Government
  - Mayor (2020–2026): Jacky Chipaux
- Area^{1}: 9.26 km^{2} (3.58 sq mi)
- Highest elevation: 530 m (1,740 ft)
- Lowest elevation: 396 m (1,299 ft)
- Population (2023): 1,184
  - Density: 128/km^{2} (331/sq mi)
- Time zone: UTC+01:00 (CET)
  - Summer (DST): UTC+02:00 (CEST)
- INSEE/Postal code: 90023 /90330
- ^{1} French Land Register data, which excludes lakes, ponds, glaciers > 1 km^{2} (0.386 sq mi or 247 acres) and river estuaries.

Chaux (French pronunciation: [ʃo]; German: Tscha) is a commune in the Territoire de Belfort department in Bourgogne-Franche-Comté in northeastern France. Chaux is located approximately 7.4 km (5 mi) south from the base of the Ballon d'Alsace mountain range, source of the Savoureuse river, 136 km (85 mi) north of Bern, Switzerland and 8.4 km (5 mi) north of Belfort, France. The immediate surrounding landscape is flat and arable.

== International relations ==
Chaux is twinned with Brinzio, Italy (2013).

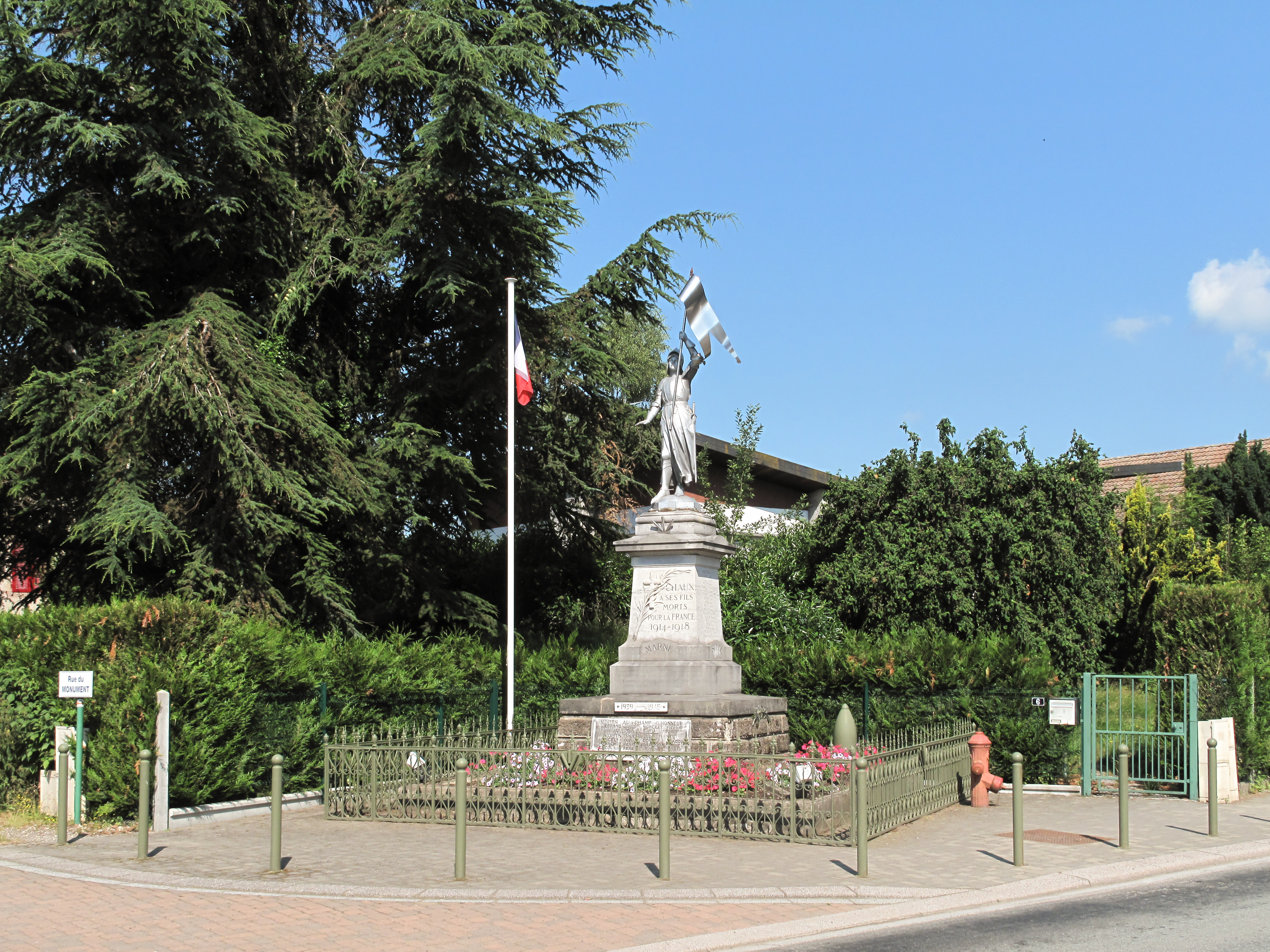
War memorial

== See also ==
- Communes of the Territoire de Belfort department
