= Cuveglio =

- Comune
- Comune di Cuveglio
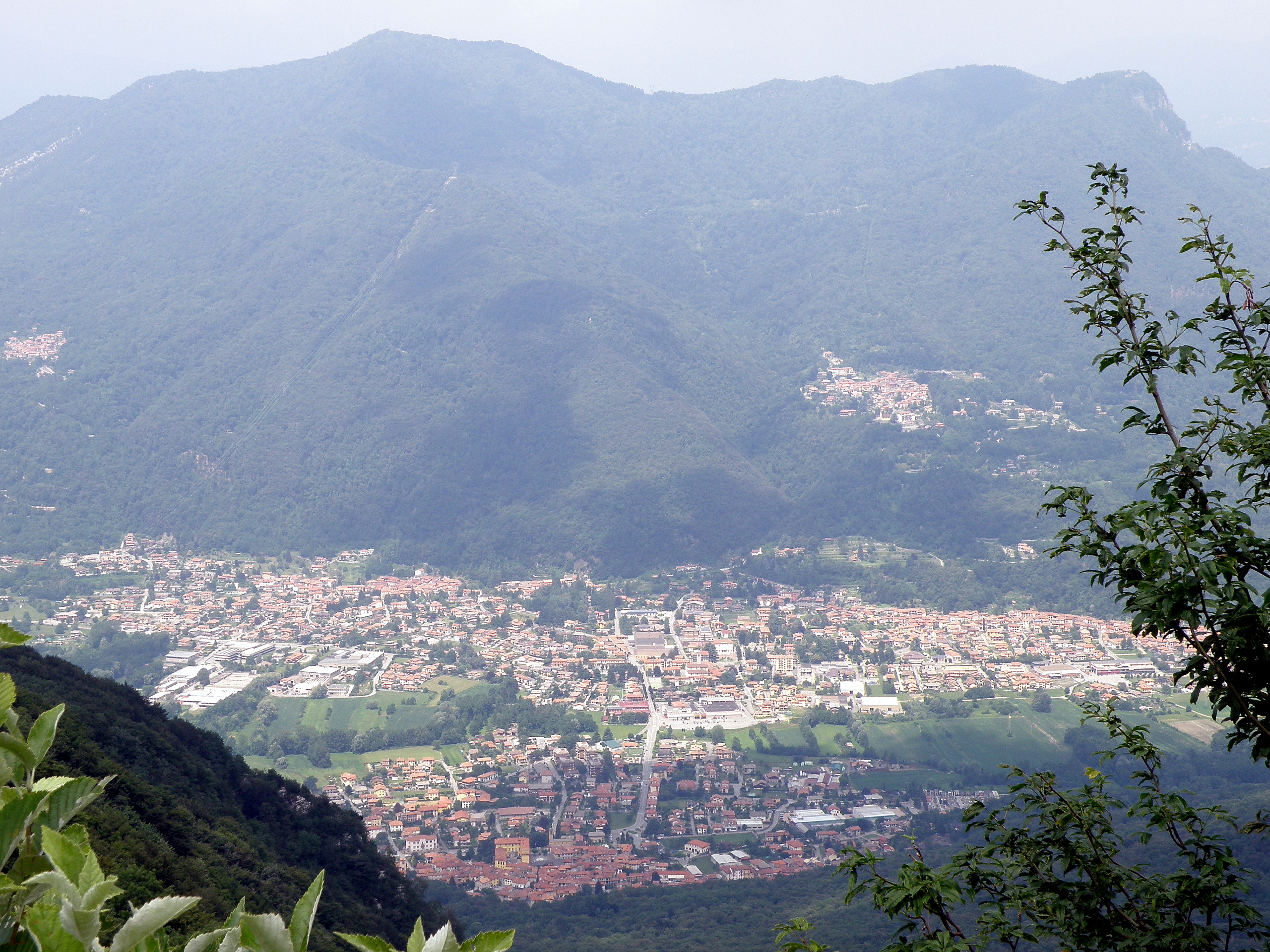

- Coat of arms

- Location within Italy Location within Lombardy
- Coordinates: 45°54′N 8°44′E
- Country: Italy
- Region: Lombardy
- Province: Province of Varese (VA)
- Frazioni: Vergobbio, Cavona, Canonica di Cuveglio

Area
  - Total: 7.7 km^{2} (3.0 sq mi)

Population (Dec. 2004)
  - Total: 3,228
  - Density: 420/km^{2} (1,100/sq mi)
- Demonym: Cuvegliesi
- Time zone: UTC+1 (CET)
  - Summer (DST): UTC+2 (CEST)
- Postal code: 21030
- Dialing code: 0332

Cuveglio (Cüéi in lombard)is a comune (municipality) in the Province of Varese in the Italian region Lombardy, located about 60 kilometres (37 mi) northwest of Milan and about 12 kilometres (7 mi) northwest of Varese. As of 31 December 2004, it had a population of 3,228 and an area of 7.7 square kilometres (3.0 mi^{2}).

The municipality of Cuveglio contains the frazioni (subdivisions, mainly villages and hamlets) Vergobbio, Cavona, and Canonica di Cuveglio.

Cuveglio borders the following municipalities: Casalzuigno, Cassano Valcuvia, Castello Cabiaglio, Cuvio, Duno, Rancio Valcuvia.

== Demographic evolution ==
Historical population

Year	Pop.	±%
1861	1,634	—
1871	1,684	+3.1%
1881	1,714	+1.8%
1901	1,587	−7.4%
1911	1,488	−6.2%

Year	Pop.	±%
1921	1,502	+0.9%
1931	1,285	−14.4%
1936	1,126	−12.4%
1951	1,368	+21.5%
1961	1,510	+10.4%

Year	Pop.	±%
1971	1,800	+19.2%
1981	2,181	+21.2%
1991	2,492	+14.3%
2001	3,021	+21.2%

Source: Data from ISTAT
