= Province of Varese =

Province of Italy, located in the Lombardy region

Coordinates: 45°49′N 8°50′E

Province of Varese Provincia di Varese (Italian) Pruvincia de Vares (Lombard)
- Province
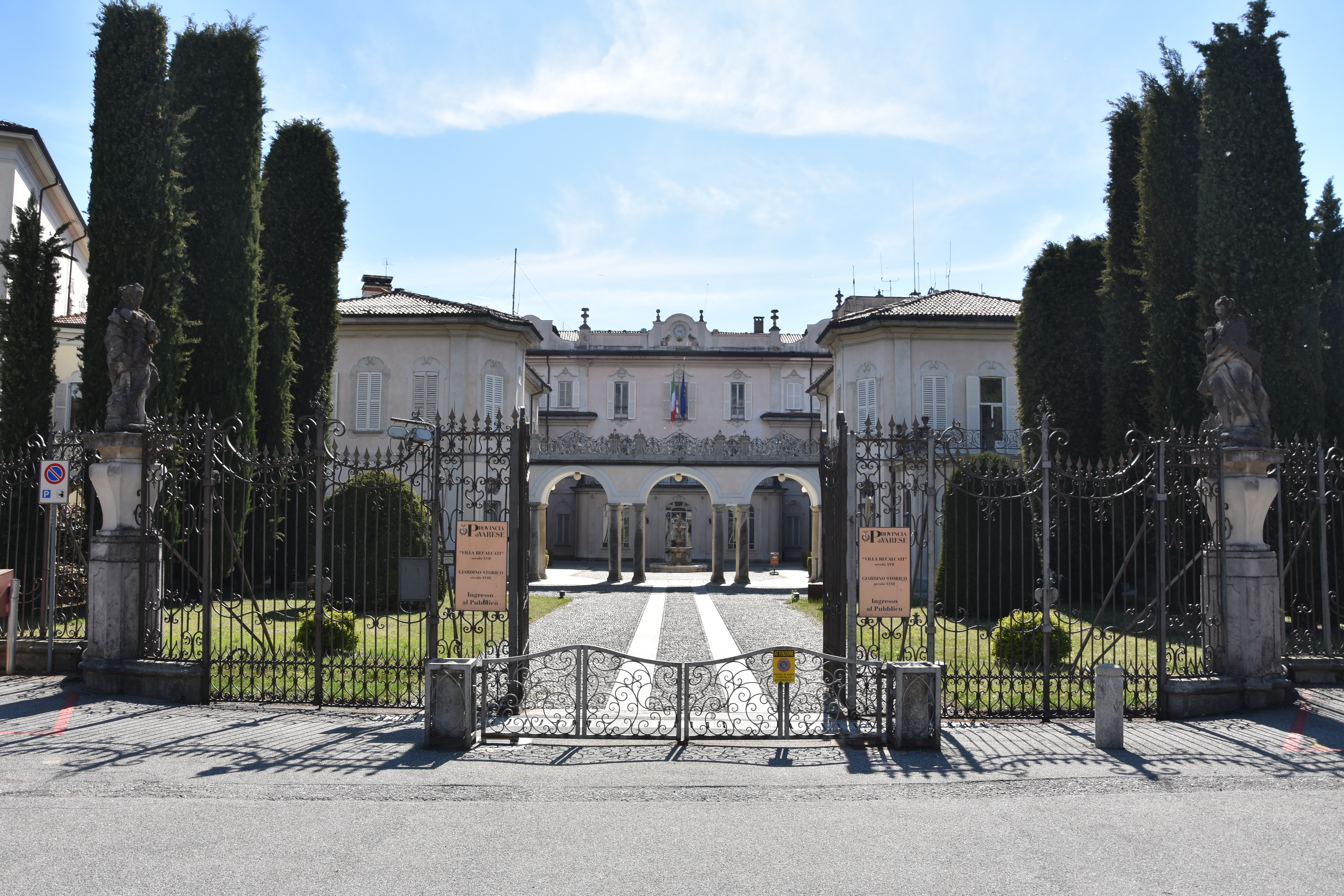
- Villa Recalcati, the provincial seat

- Flag Coat of arms

- Location of the Province of Varese in Italy
- Country: Italy
- Region: Lombardy
- Capital(s): Varese
- Municipalities: 136

Government
  - President: Marco Magrini

Area
  - Total: 1,198.11 km^{2} (462.59 sq mi)

Population (2026)
  - Total: 884,801
  - Density: 738.497/km^{2} (1,912.70/sq mi)

GDP
  - Total: €31.41 billion (2015)
  - Per capita: €35,287 (2015)
- Time zone: UTC+1 (CET)
  - Summer (DST): UTC+2 (CEST)
- Postal code: 210xx, 21100
- Telephone prefix: 02, 0331, 0332
- Vehicle registration: VA
- ISTAT code: 012

The Province of Varese (Italian: provincia di Varese, Lombard: Pruvincia de Vares) is a province in the region of Lombardy in Italy. Its capital is Varese, but the largest city is Busto Arsizio.

It has a population of 884,801 in an area of 1,198.11 square kilometres (462.59 mi^{2}) across its 136 municipalities, making it the 6th most densely populated province of Italy.

The headquarters of AgustaWestland, the company merged into Leonardo since 2016 and the world's largest producer of helicopters, is based in Samarate, a town of the province.

== History ==
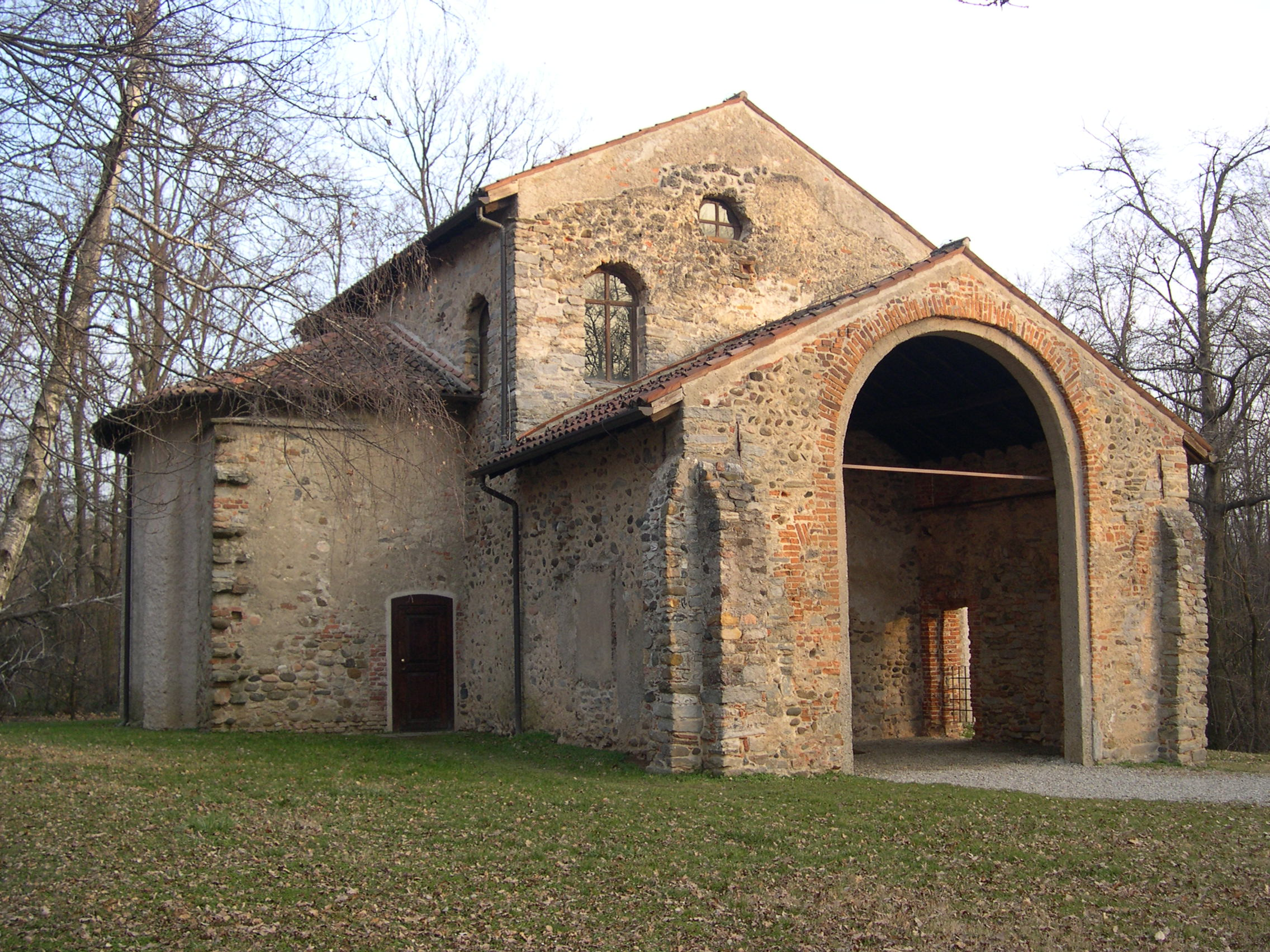
Church of Santa Maria foris portas in Castelseprio archaeological park

In Roman times, the fortified settlements of Castelseprio and the port of Angera were of high importance in the region. The House of Visconti conquered the region in the 13th century and completely destroyed Castelseprio. The House of Visconti used the land for agricultural purposes and as part of the territories of Milan. During this Visconti rule, Varese became prosperous due to high levels of trade in the region but remained small. Prior to his appointment as Duke, Francesco III d'Este, Duke of Modena lived in the region during the 18th century. While the unification of Italy was initiating, Italian general Giuseppe Garibaldi attempted to install anti-Austrians in Varese; in response to this, the Austrians attempted to invade in 1859, and a battle occurred in Varese, resulting in Garibaldi's victory. During the second half of the 19th century, the area saw considerable economic growth with the birth of numerous factories, especially in the paper, mechanical, and textile industries. Umberto Bossi was born in 1941 near Varese, who believed that the region of Lombardy should have a degree of independence; in 1986, he founded the Lombard League which became a component of the Lega Nord ("North League").

== Geography ==
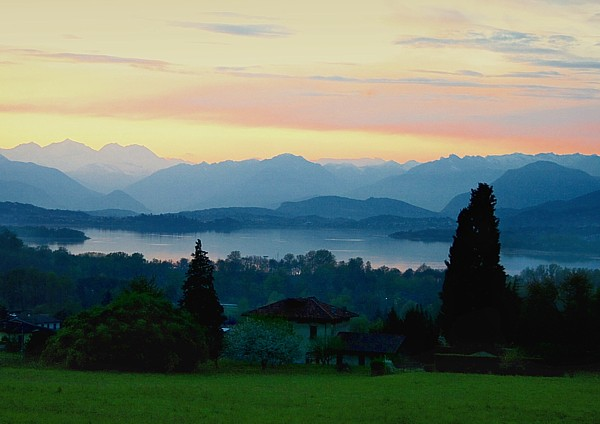
Lake Varese

The province of Varese is one of twelve provinces in the region of Lombardy, northern Italy. It is the most northwesterly province in the region and its northern border forms the international boundary with Switzerland. The province of Verbano-Cusio-Ossola in the Piedmont region lies to the northwest and the province of Novara, also in Piedmont, to the west. To the south lies the Metropolitan City of Milan, and to the east, the province of Monza and Brianza, and the province of Como. The provincial capital is the city of Varese, which is situated beside Lake Varese at the foot of Sacro Monte di Varese, part of the Campo dei Fiori di Varese mountain range; the city is also close to the Cinque Vette Park.

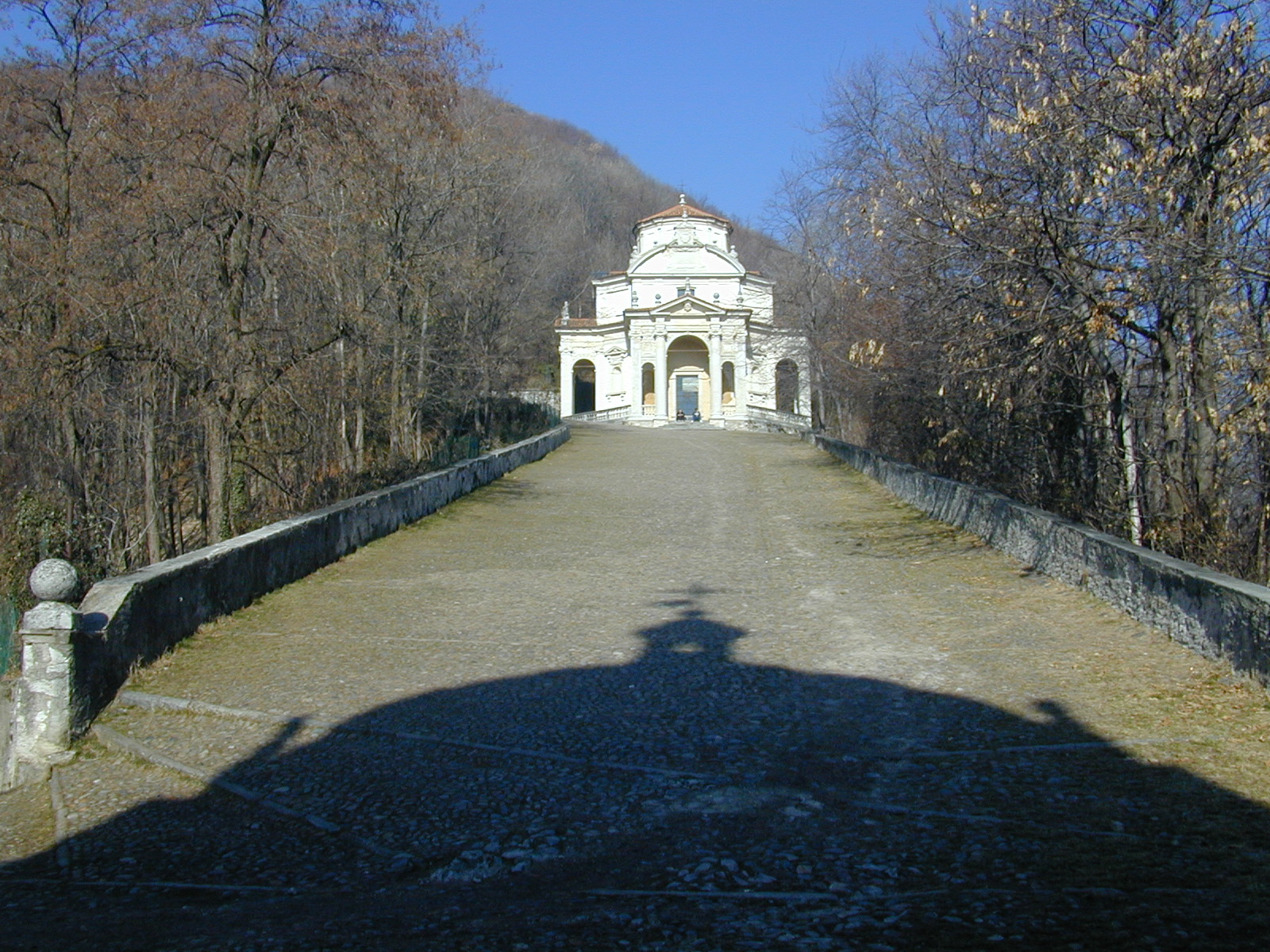
Chapel n°5, Sacro Monte di Varese

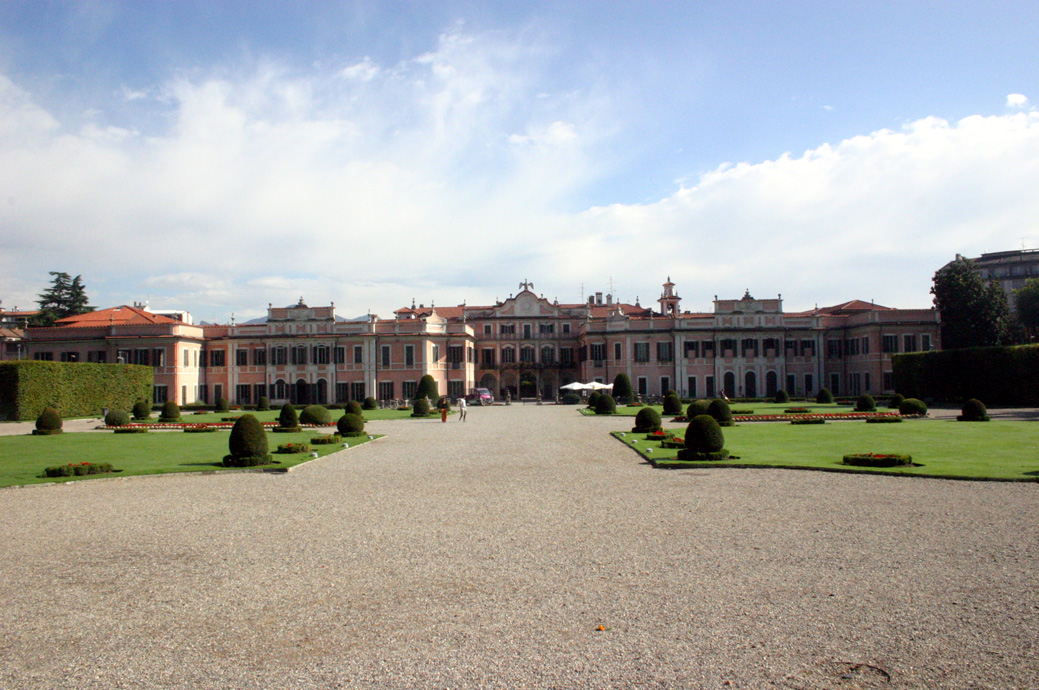
Varese Palace

== Government ==
=== Municipalities ===
The province has 136 municipalities:

- Agra
- Albizzate
- Angera
- Arcisate
- Arsago Seprio
- Azzate
- Azzio
- Barasso
- Bardello con Malgesso e Bregano
- Bedero Valcuvia
- Besano
- Besnate
- Besozzo
- Biandronno
- Bisuschio
- Bodio Lomnago
- Brebbia
- Brenta
- Brezzo di Bedero
- Brinzio
- Brissago-Valtravaglia
- Brunello
- Brusimpiano
- Buguggiate
- Busto Arsizio
- Cadegliano-Viconago
- Cadrezzate con Osmate
- Cairate
- Cantello
- Caravate
- Cardano al Campo
- Carnago
- Caronno Pertusella
- Caronno Varesino
- Casale Litta
- Casalzuigno
- Casciago
- Casorate Sempione
- Cassano Magnago
- Cassano Valcuvia
- Castellanza
- Castello Cabiaglio
- Castelseprio
- Castelveccana
- Castiglione Olona
- Castronno
- Cavaria con Premezzo
- Cazzago Brabbia
- Cislago
- Cittiglio
- Clivio
- Cocquio-Trevisago
- Comabbio
- Comerio
- Cremenaga
- Crosio della Valle
- Cuasso al Monte
- Cugliate-Fabiasco
- Cunardo
- Curiglia con Monteviasco
- Cuveglio
- Cuvio
- Daverio
- Dumenza
- Duno
- Fagnano Olona
- Ferno
- Ferrera di Varese
- Gallarate
- Galliate Lombardo
- Gavirate
- Gazzada Schianno
- Gemonio
- Gerenzano
- Germignaga
- Golasecca
- Gorla Maggiore
- Gorla Minore
- Gornate-Olona
- Grantola
- Inarzo
- Induno Olona
- Ispra
- Jerago con Orago
- Lavena Ponte Tresa
- Laveno-Mombello
- Leggiuno
- Lonate Ceppino
- Lonate Pozzolo
- Lozza
- Luino
- Luvinate
- Maccagno con Pino e Veddasca
- Malnate
- Marchirolo
- Marnate
- Marzio
- Masciago Primo
- Mercallo
- Mesenzana
- Montegrino Valtravaglia
- Monvalle
- Morazzone
- Mornago
- Oggiona con Santo Stefano
- Olgiate Olona
- Origgio
- Orino
- Porto Ceresio
- Porto Valtravaglia
- Rancio Valcuvia
- Ranco
- Saltrio
- Samarate
- Sangiano
- Saronno
- Sesto Calende
- Solbiate Arno
- Solbiate Olona
- Somma Lombardo
- Sumirago
- Taino
- Ternate
- Tradate
- Travedona-Monate
- Tronzano Lago Maggiore
- Uboldo
- Valganna
- Varano Borghi
- Varese
- Vedano Olona
- Venegono Inferiore
- Venegono Superiore
- Vergiate
- Viggiù
- Vizzola Ticino
Gallery
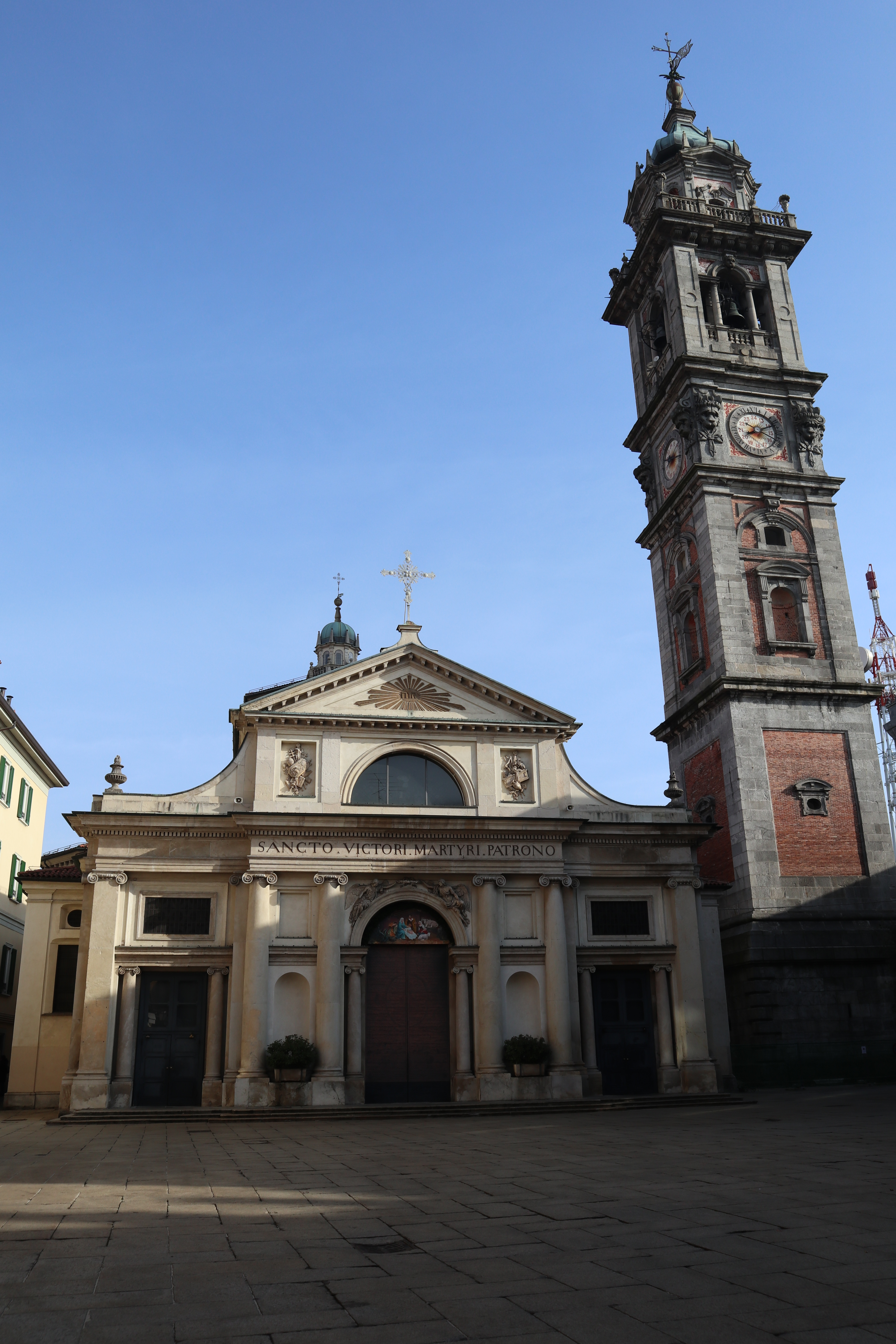
Varese

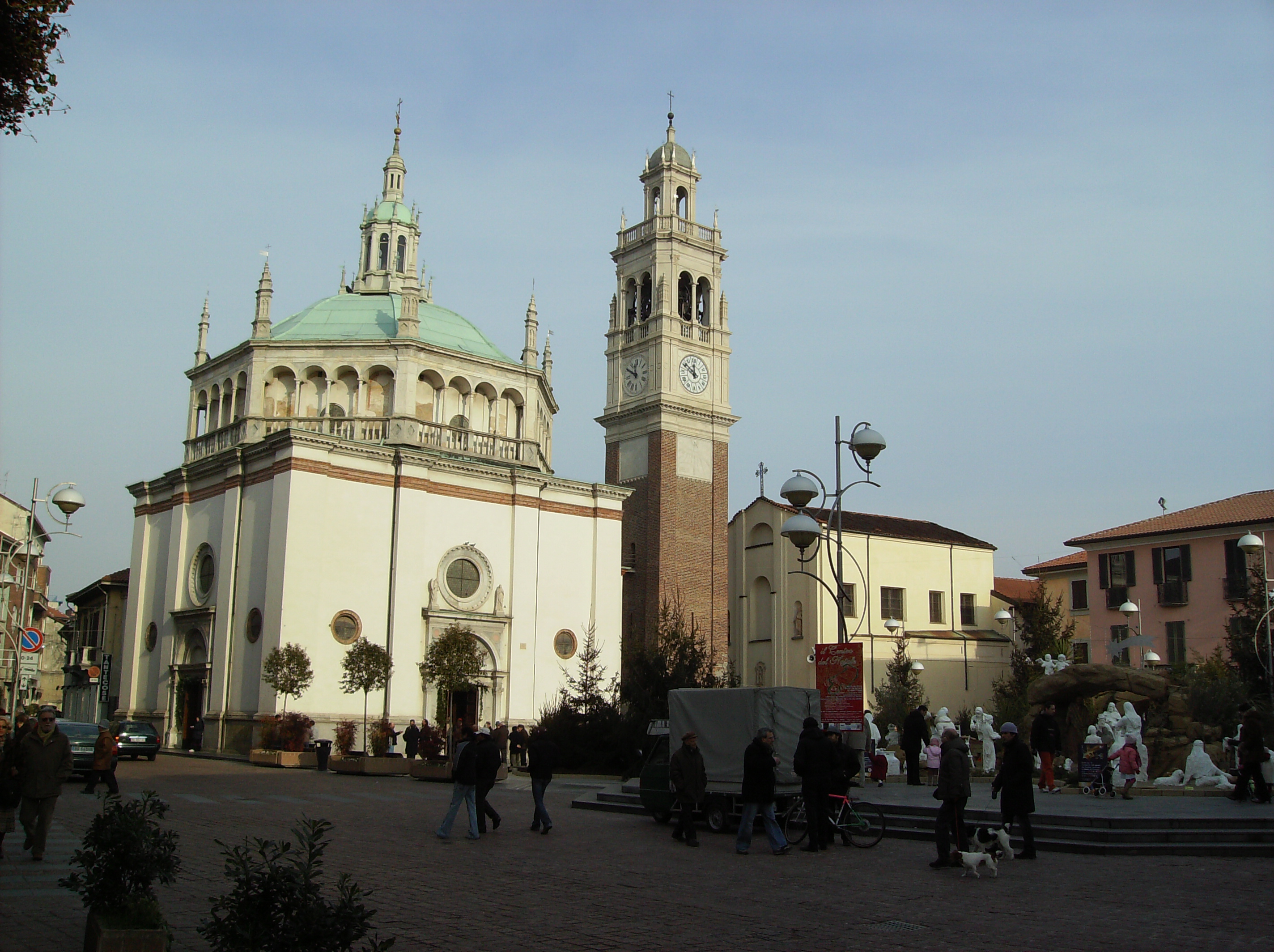
Busto Arsizio

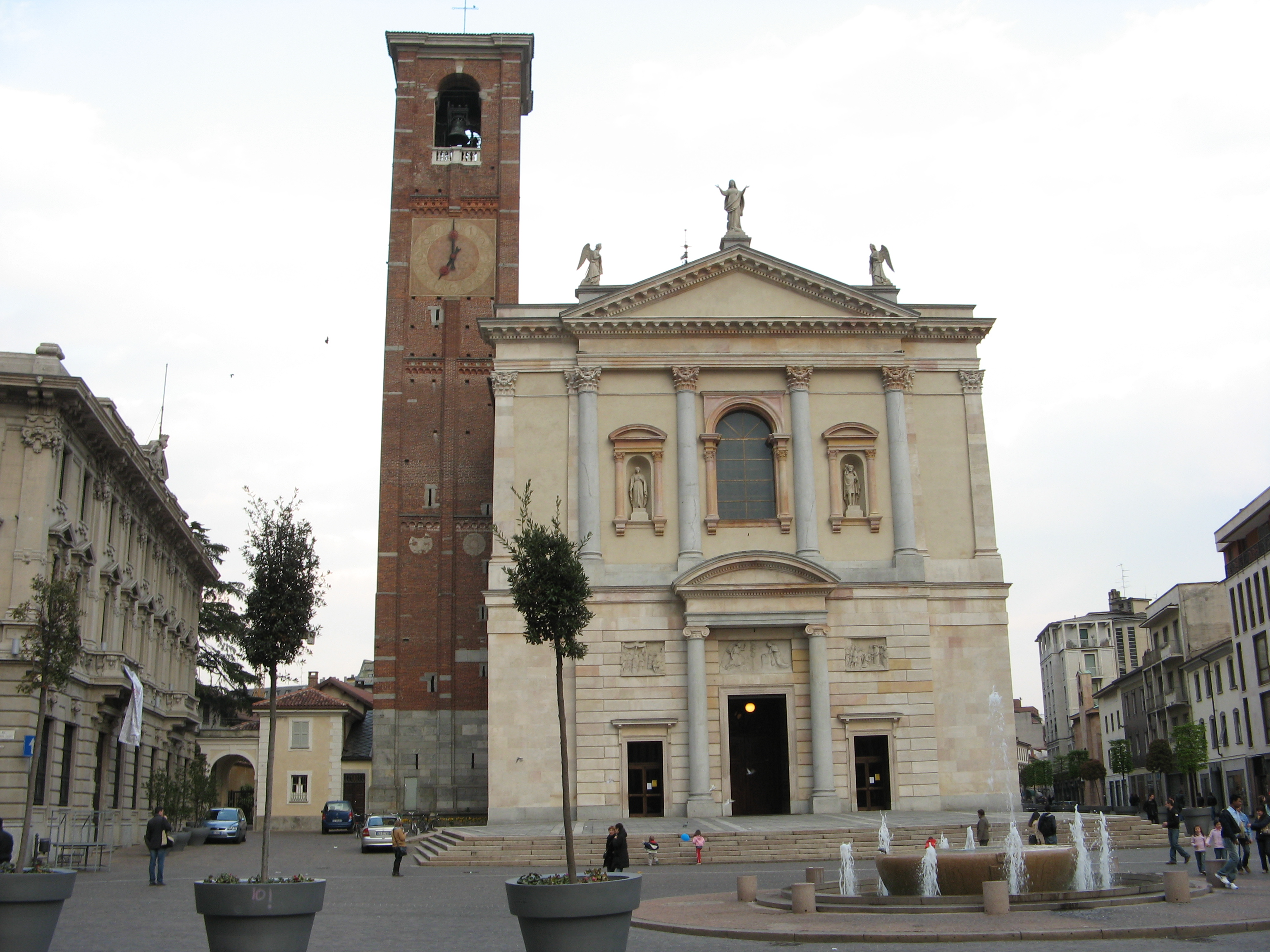
Gallarate

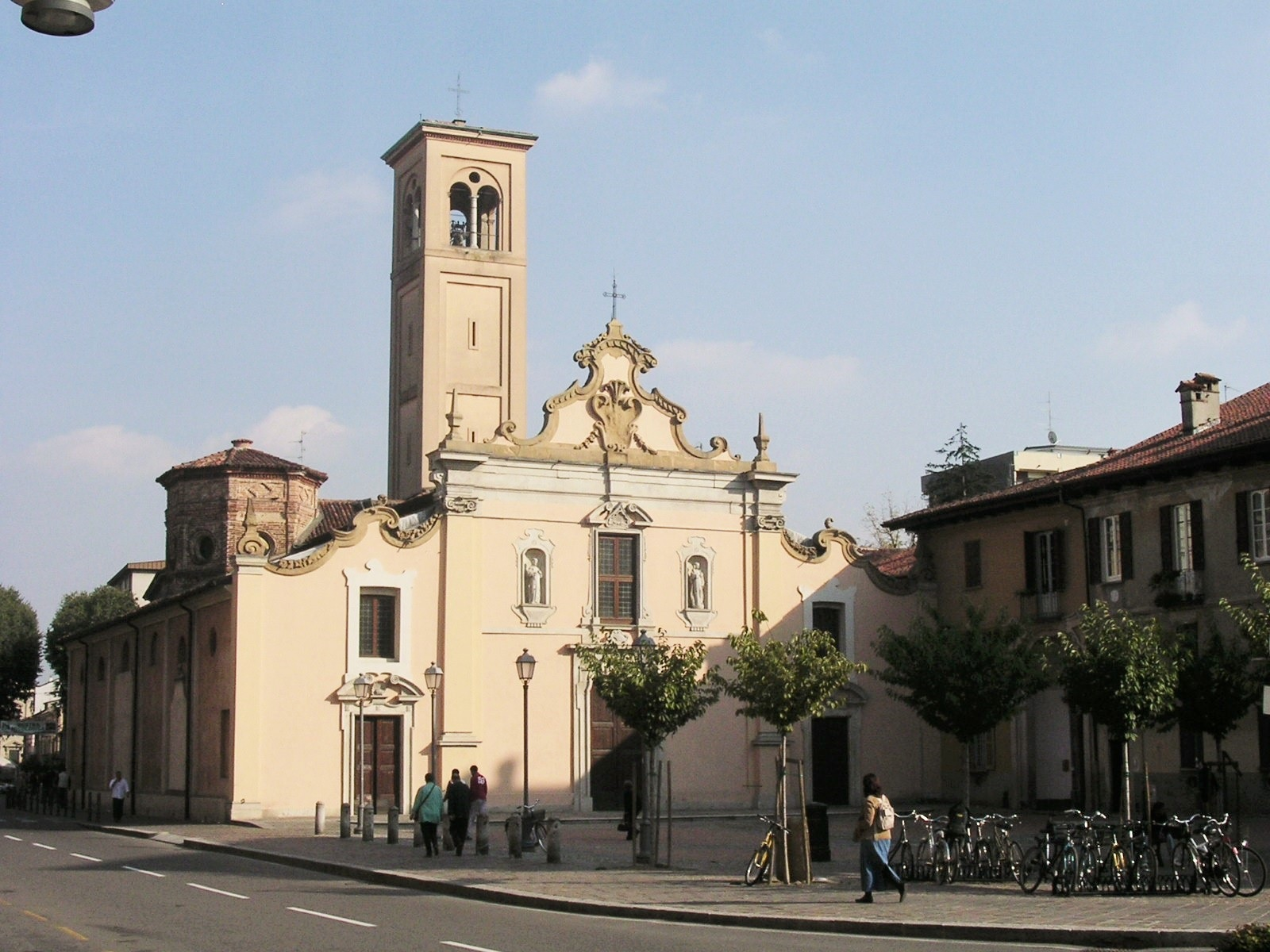
Saronno

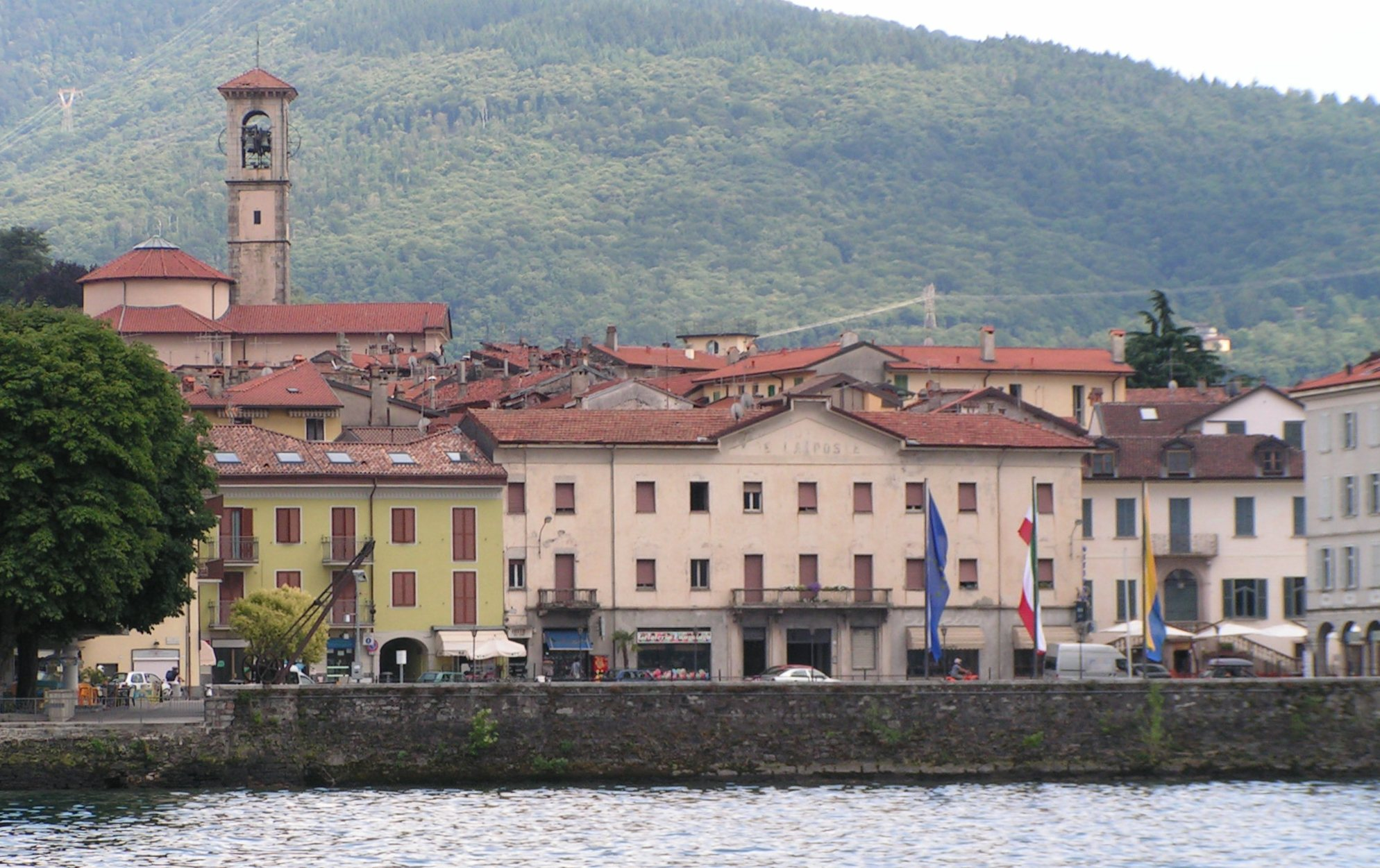
Luino

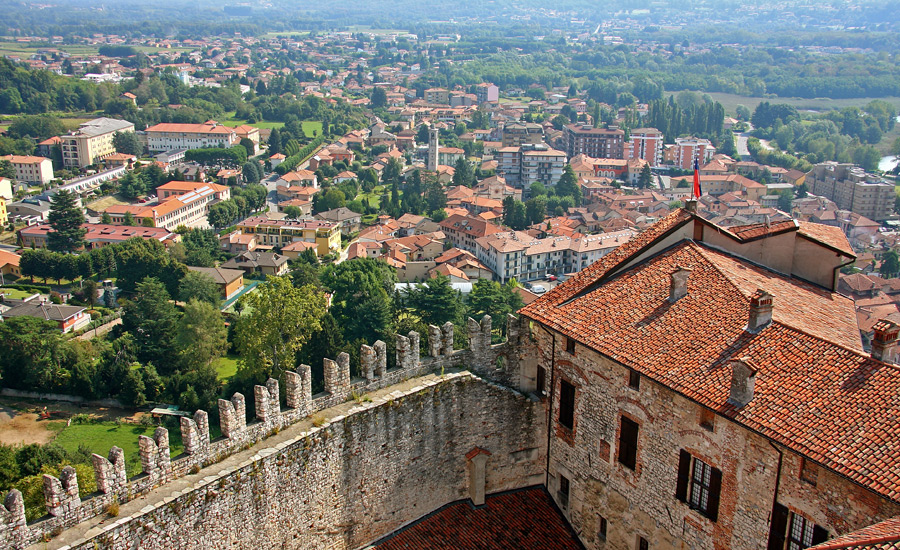
Angera

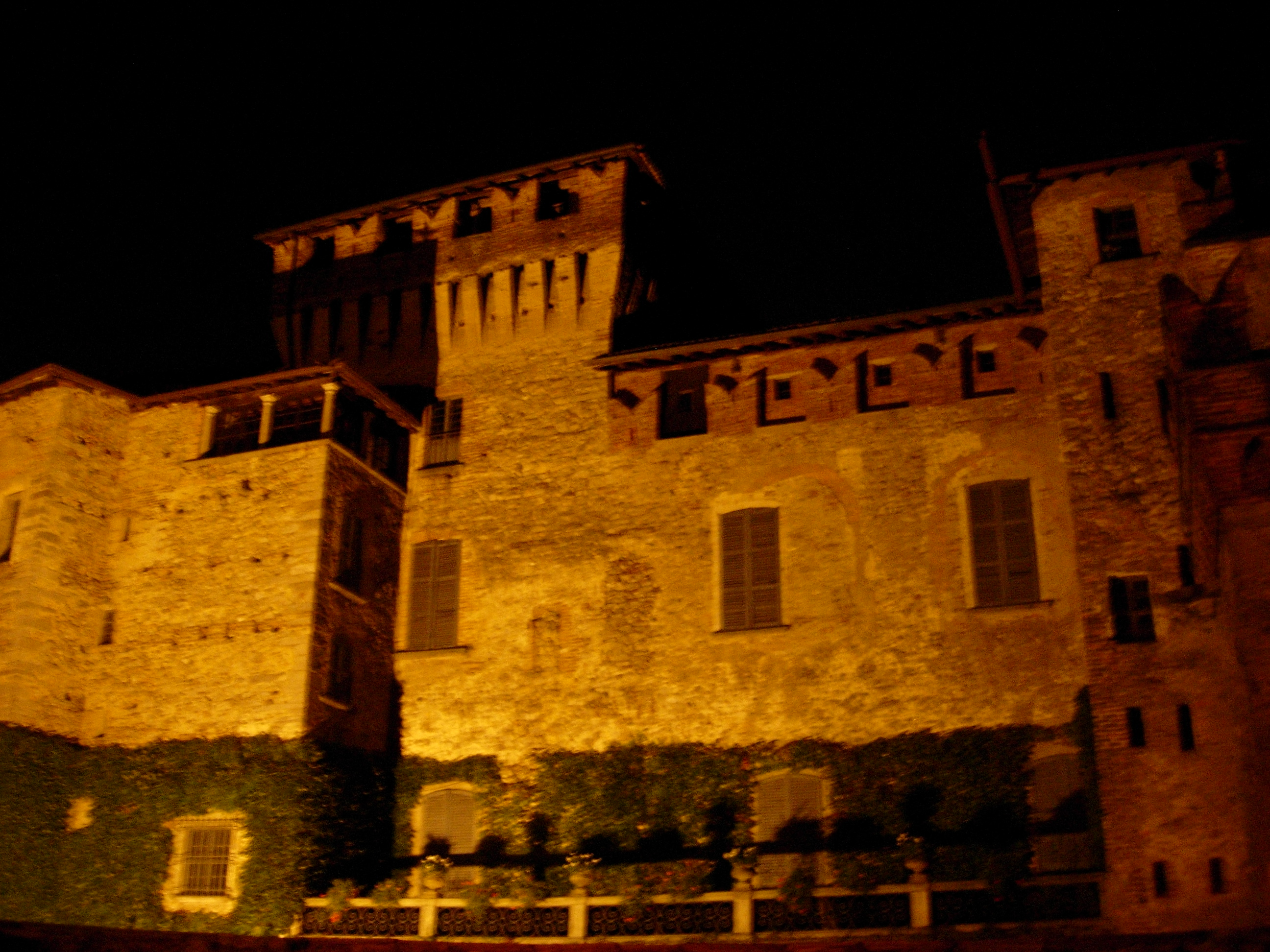
Somma Lombardo

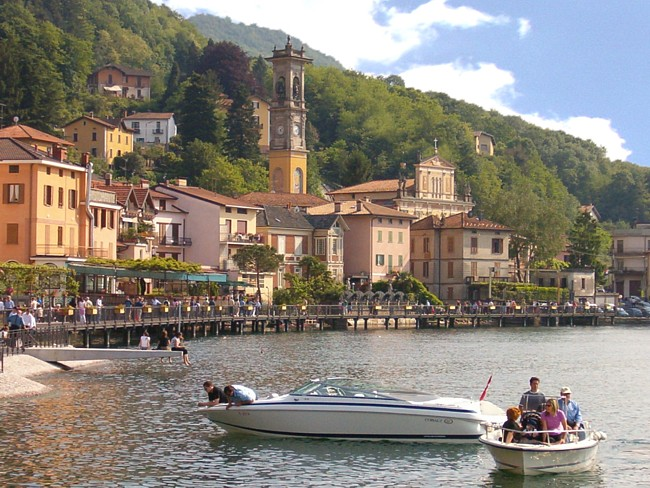
Porto Ceresio

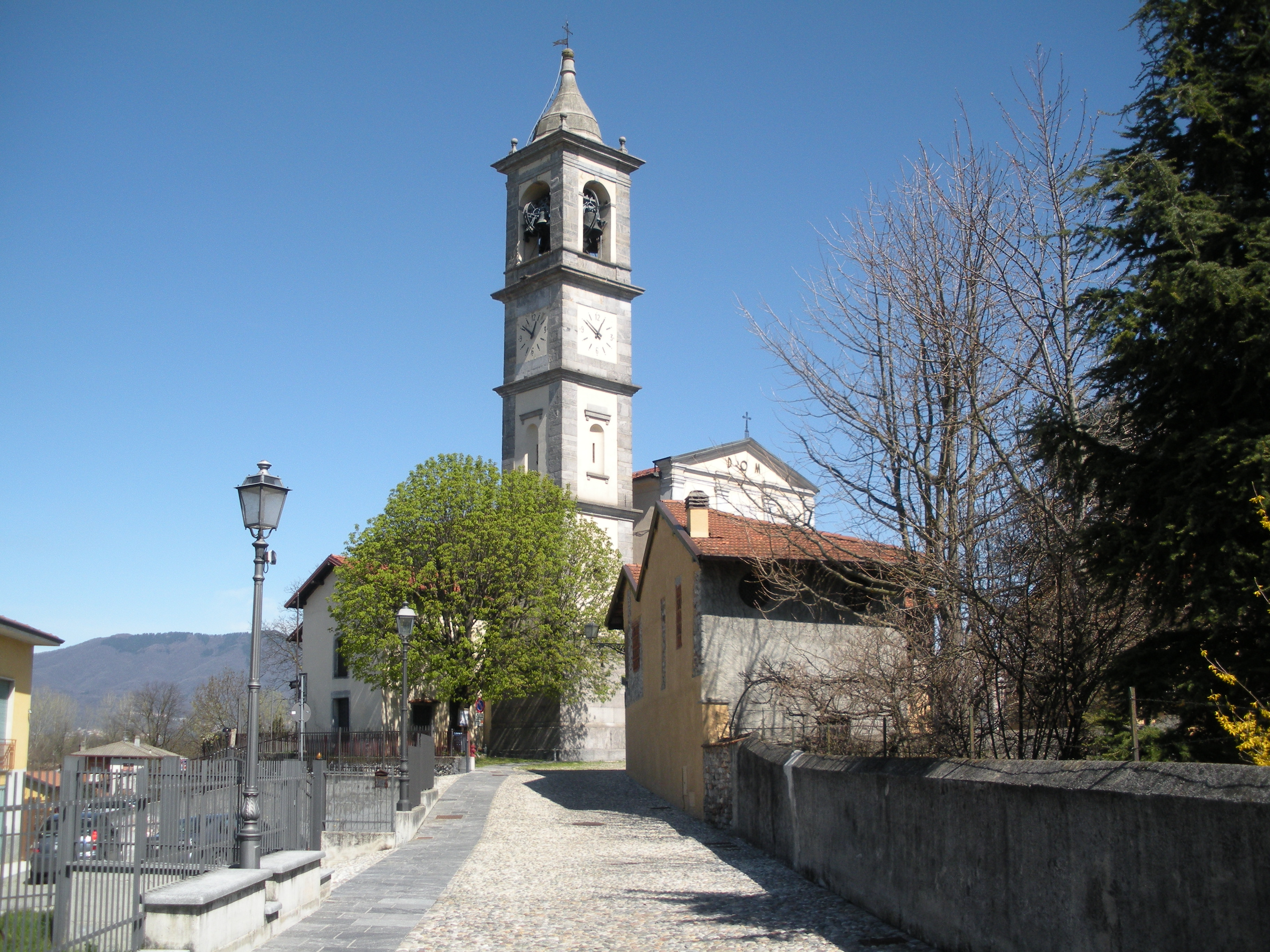
Inarzo

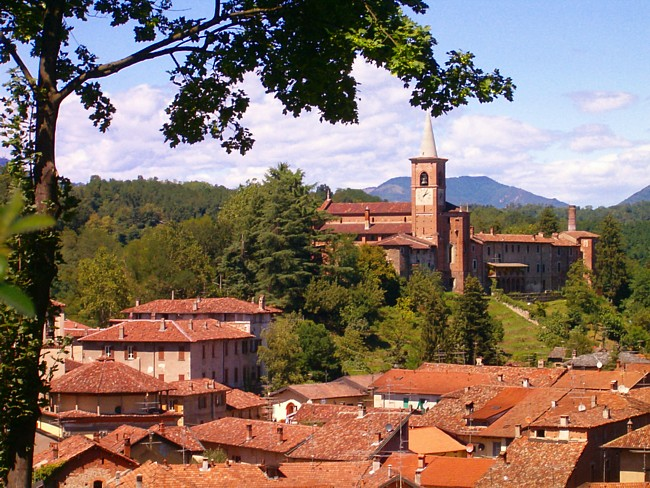
Castiglione Olona

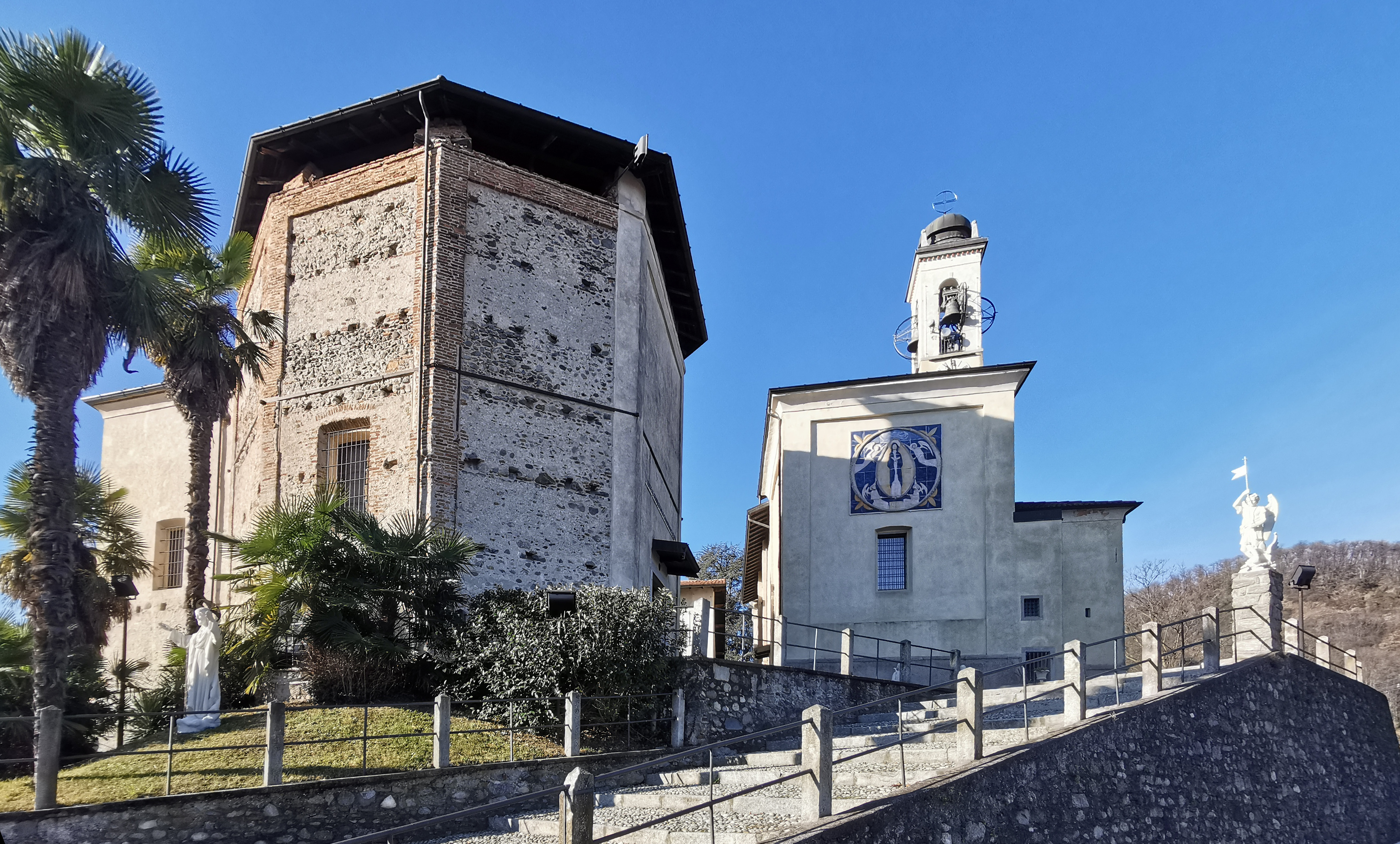
Comabbio

== Demographics ==
Historical population
Year	Pop.	±%
1861	232,765	—
1871	249,497	+7.2%
1881	264,866	+6.2%
1901	308,394	+16.4%
1911	353,952	+14.8%
1921	366,798	+3.6%
1931	391,449	+6.7%
1936	396,232	+1.2%
1951	477,055	+20.4%
1961	581,528	+21.9%
1971	725,823	+24.8%
1981	788,057	+8.6%
1991	797,039	+1.1%
2001	812,477	+1.9%
2011	871,886	+7.3%
2021	877,668	+0.7%
Source: ISTAT

As of 2026, the population is 884,801, of which 49.0% are male, and 51.0% are female. Minors make up 14.8% of the population, and seniors make up 25.4%.

=== Immigration ===
As of 2025, immigrants make up 12.3% of the population. The 5 largest foreign countries of birth are Albania, Morocco, Romania, Ukraine, and Switzerland.

== Economy ==
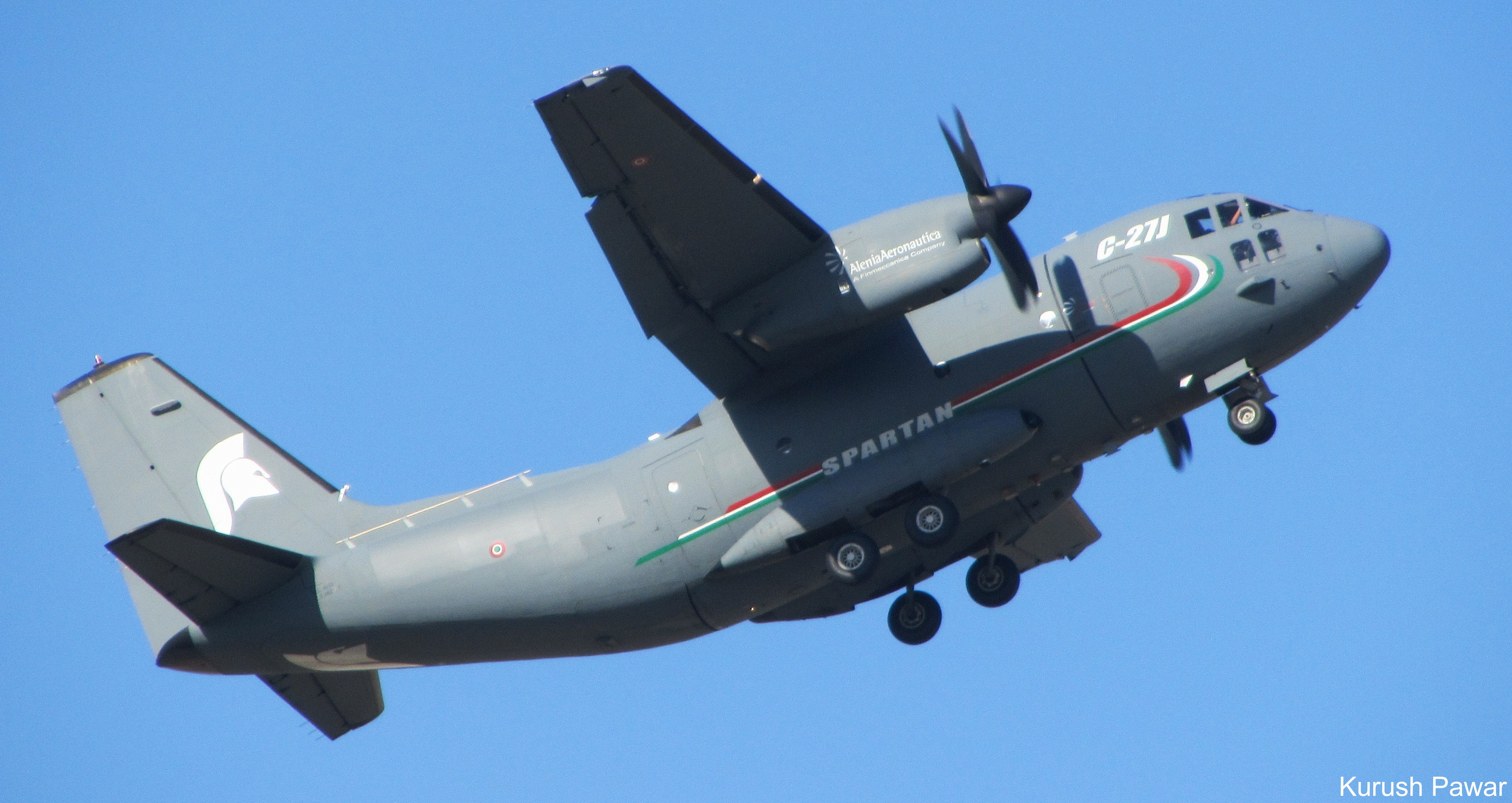
Alenia Aermacchi airplane

The agriculture of this sub-Alpine region is based on livestock farming and the economy mainly relies on the industrial sector, with many people commuting daily to Milan. Among the main companies headquartered in the province are Alenia Aermacchi (aeronautics), AgustaWestland (aeronautics), Bticino (metalworking), Cagiva (motorcycles), Birrificio Angelo Poretti (brewery), Ignis (home appliances), Vibram (footwear soles). In the past the province was famous for its textile industry, especially in the Olona Valley and the Busto Arsizio-Gallarate area, but this has gradually declined since the 1970s. Likewise, Varese was the birthplace of some of Italy's main aircraft manufacturers; in addition to the already-mentioned Aermacchi and AgustaWestland, Savoia Marchetti was also born here.

There are local cheeses made from goat's milk and local meat dishes, and there are freshwater fish caught in the many lakes. Other local products are a local variety of asparagus, chestnuts, berries and honey, and grapes grown locally are made into traditional red and white wines.

== Cuisine ==
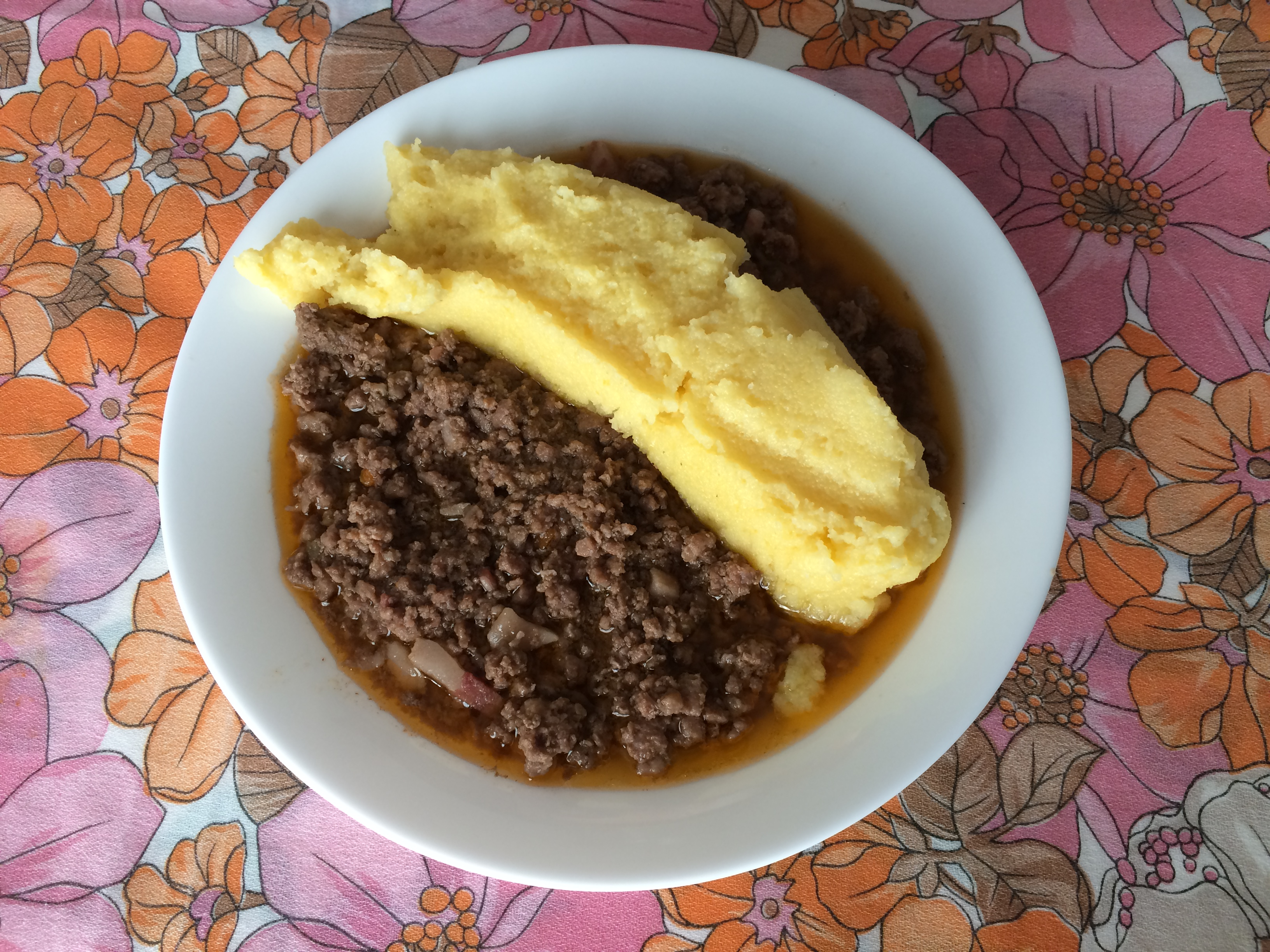
Bruscitti served with polenta porridge

Common in the whole Insubria area is bruscitti (Italian: [bruˈʃitti]; Lombard: brüscitt, Lombard: [bryˈʃit]; lit. 'crumbs') an Italian single-course meal of the Lombard, Piedmontese, and Ticinese cuisines based on finely chopped beef cooked for a long time. It is a typical winter dish and is served with polenta, purée or risotto alla milanese. Bruscitti is originally from the comune (municipality) of Busto Arsizio, Lombardy, Italy. Bruscitti is widespread in northwestern Lombardy (Italy), northeastern Piedmont (Italy), and lower Ticino (Switzerland). The dish probably originated in the Middle Ages. Based on finely chopped beef and cooked for a long time (from 2 to 4 hours) on a low flame, the other ingredients of the dish are butter, garlic, fennel seeds, and lard or pancetta. At the end of cooking, it is blended with well-structured red wines such as Barbera, Barolo or Nebbiolo.

== Education ==
In Gorla Minore, a municipality in the province of Varese, there is Collegio Rotondi, a Catholic charter school established in 1599.

== Transport ==
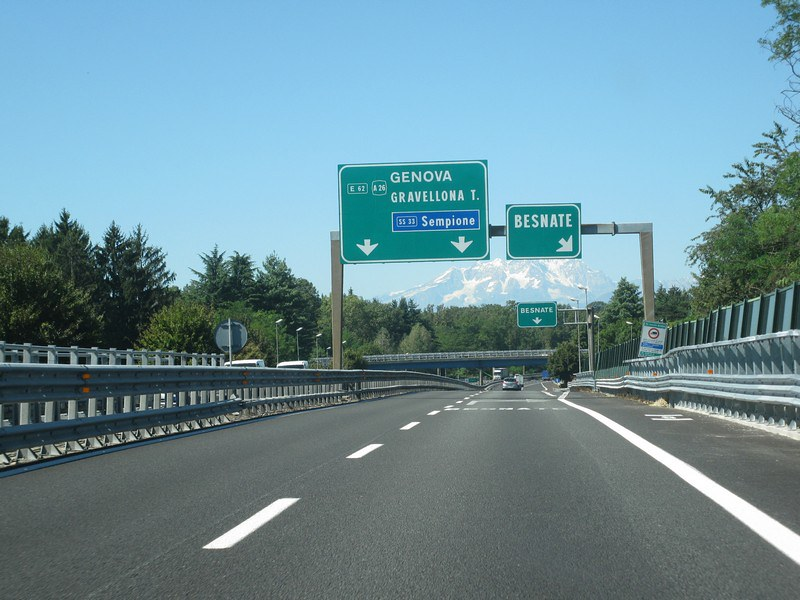
Autostrada A8 near Besnate

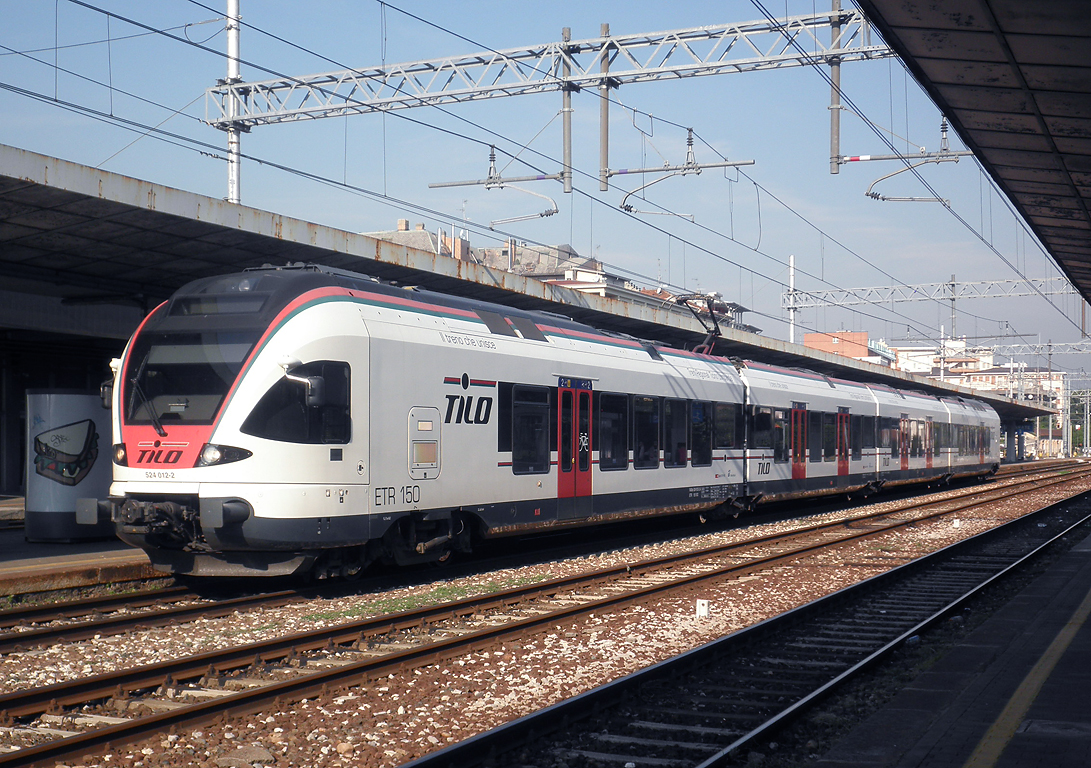
Gallarate railway station

=== Motorways ===
- Autostrada A8: Milan-Varese
- Autostrada A9: Lainate-Como-Chiasso
- Autostrada A36: Cassano Magnago-Lentate sul Seveso
- Autostrada A60: Beltway around Varese

=== Railway lines ===
- Porto Ceresio–Milan railway
- Mendrisio–Varese railway
- Saronno–Laveno railway
- Domodossola–Milan railway
- Luino–Oleggio railway

== See also ==
- Olona
- Olona valley
- Olona River Consortium
