= Bedero Valcuvia =

- Comune
- Comune di Bedero Valcuvia
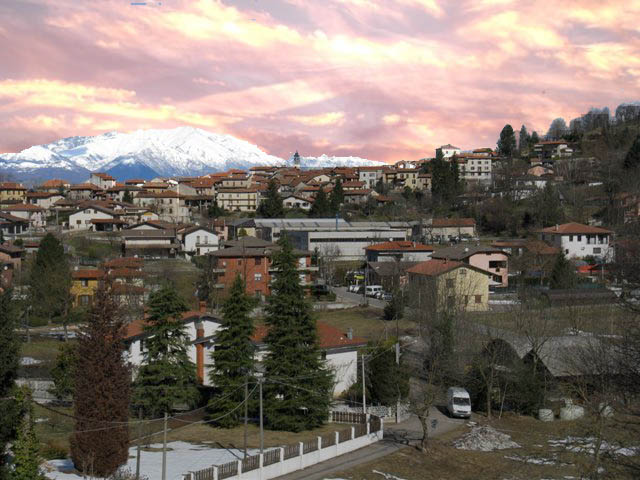
- View of Bedero Valcuvia

- Coat of arms

- Location within Italy Location within Lombardy
- Coordinates: 45°55′N 08°48′E
- Country: Italy
- Region: Lombardy
- Province: Varese (VA)

Government
  - Mayor: Carlo Paolo Galli

Area
  - Total: 2.56 km^{2} (0.99 sq mi)
- Elevation: 520 m (1,710 ft)

Population (28 February 2017)
  - Total: 665
  - Density: 260/km^{2} (673/sq mi)
- Demonym: Bederesi
- Time zone: UTC+1 (CET)
  - Summer (DST): UTC+2 (CEST)
- Postal code: 21039
- Dialing code: 0332
- Website: Official website

Bedero Valcuvia is a town and comune located in the province of Varese, in the Lombardy region of northern Italy, in the Valcuvia valley.
