= Barasso =

- Comune
- Comune di Barasso
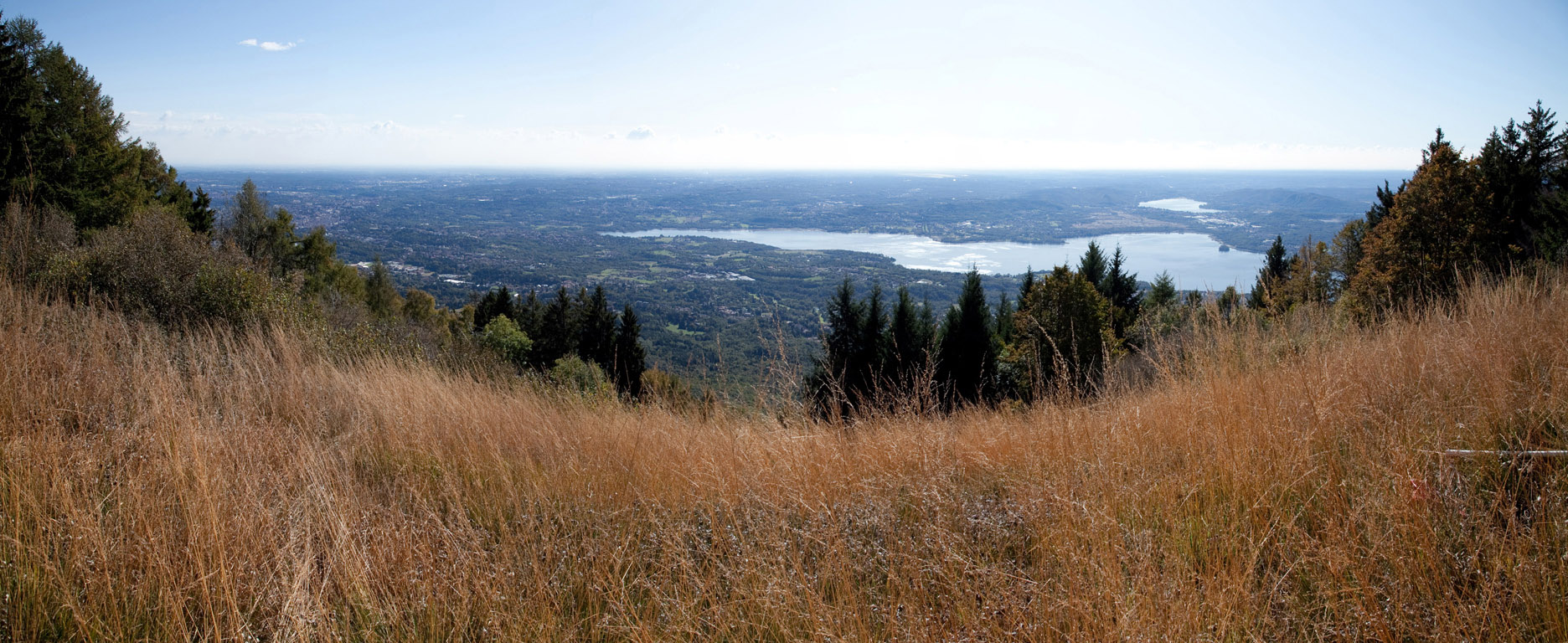
- Campo dei Fiore

- Coat of arms

- Location within Italy Location within Lombardy
- Coordinates: 45°50′N 08°46′E
- Country: Italy
- Region: Lombardy
- Province: Varese (VA)

Government
  - Mayor: Lorenzo Di Renzo Scolari

Area
  - Total: 4 km^{2} (1.5 sq mi)

Population (2018-01-01)
  - Total: 1,657
  - Density: 410/km^{2} (1,100/sq mi)
- Time zone: UTC+1 (CET)
  - Summer (DST): UTC+2 (CEST)
- Postal code: 21020
- Dialing code: 0332
- Website: Official website

Barasso (Lombard: Barass, Varesino dialect Baràs) is a town and comune located in the province of Varese in the Lombardy region of northern Italy. As of 2020, Barasso had a population of 1,657 people.

== History ==
In the fourth century, Emperor Theodosius I commissioned S.Giulio to build a church there.
