= Arsizio =

Arsizio may refer to:

- Brusino Arsizio, municipality in the canton of Ticino in Switzerland
- Busto Arsizio, city and comune, in the province of Varese, Italy
