= Cuasso al Monte =

- Comune
- Comune di Cuasso al Monte
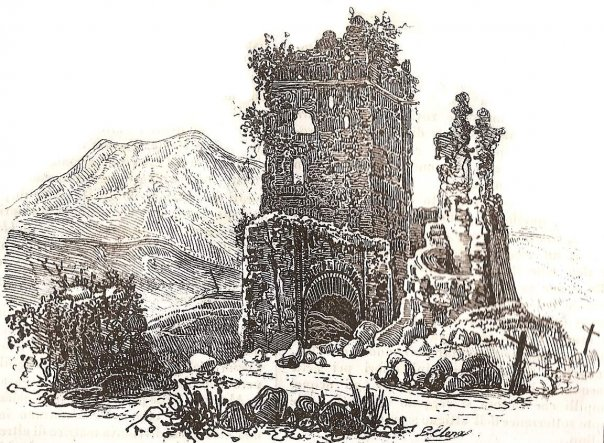

- Location within Italy Location within Lombardy
- Coordinates: 45°52′N 8°52′E
- Country: Italy
- Region: Lombardy
- Province: Province of Varese (VA)

Area
  - Total: 16.4 km^{2} (6.3 sq mi)

Population (Dec. 2004)
  - Total: 3,252
  - Density: 198/km^{2} (514/sq mi)
- Time zone: UTC+1 (CET)
  - Summer (DST): UTC+2 (CEST)
- Postal code: 21050
- Dialing code: 0332
- Website: Official website

Cuasso al Monte is a comune (municipality) in the Province of Varese in the Italian region Lombardy, located about 50 kilometres (31 mi) northwest of Milan and about 6 kilometres (4 mi) northeast of Varese. As of 31 December 2004, it had a population of 3,252 and an area of 16.4 square kilometres (6.3 mi^{2}). It takes the name from the Lombard term Chaos, (den). Whereas the term "al monte" refers to the fact that it is situated at the foot of Monte Piambello.

Cuasso al Monte borders the following municipalities: Arcisate, Besano, Bisuschio, Brusimpiano, Cugliate-Fabiasco, Marchirolo, Marzio, Porto Ceresio, Valganna. The Village makes part of the Cinque Vette Park and it lies at the foot of Monte Piambello.

== Population history ==
Historical population

Year	Pop.	±%
1861	1,528	—
1871	1,514	−0.9%
1881	1,582	+4.5%
1901	1,443	−8.8%
1911	1,680	+16.4%

Year	Pop.	±%
1921	1,795	+6.8%
1931	1,749	−2.6%
1936	1,683	−3.8%
1951	1,865	+10.8%
1961	2,108	+13.0%

Year	Pop.	±%
1971	2,387	+13.2%
1981	2,691	+12.7%
1991	2,779	+3.3%
2001	3,065	+10.3%

Source: Data from ISTAT
