= Roger Morigi =

Italian-American stone carver

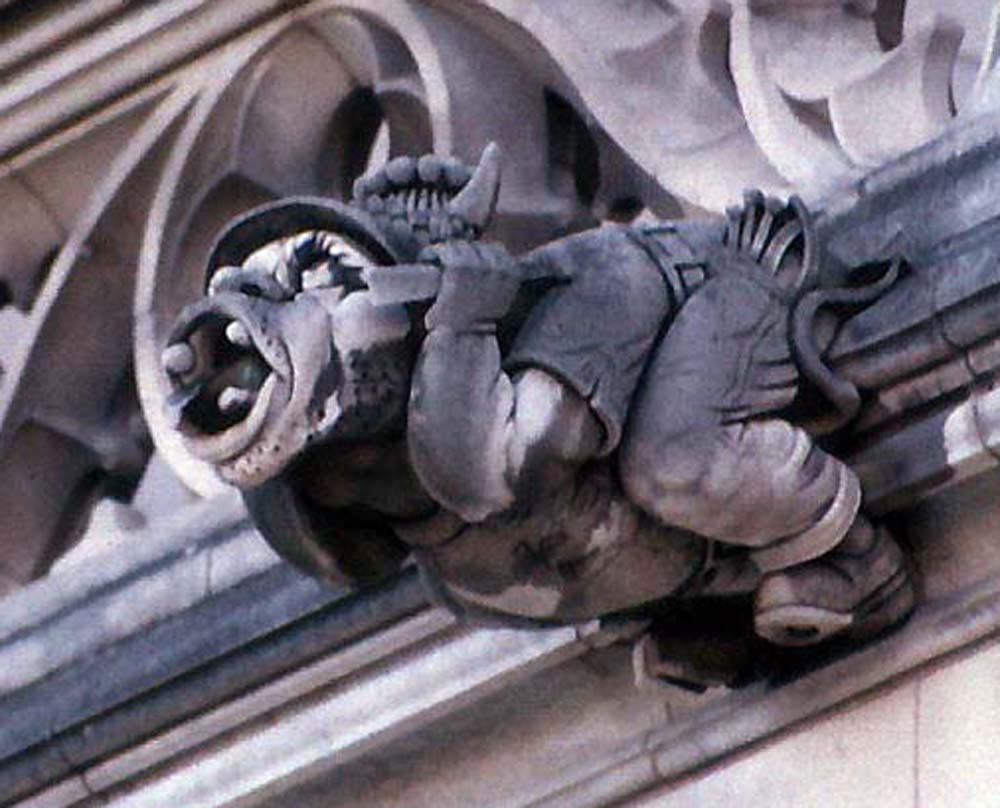
Master Carver Gargoyle (1960s), John Guarente, sculptor and carver, Washington National Cathedral. Note the horns and the mushroom cloud bursting through Morigi's golf hat.

Roger (Ruggiero) Morigi (4 October 1907 – 12 January 1995) was an Italian-born American stone carver and architectural sculptor. He made major contributions to Washington National Cathedral and other buildings in Washington, D.C. He was the teacher and mentor of sculptor Frederick Hart.

The National Cathedral's Master Carver Gargoyle, modeled and carved by John Guarente in the 1960s, is a caricature of Morigi. It depicts him as a devil, with a cloven hoof, horns and a tail, a mallet and a pocket-full of chisels, a bag of golf clubs, and a mushroom cloud -- indicating his violent temper -- bursting through his golf hat.

== Early career ==
He was born in Bisuschio, Lombardy, the son of Napoleone and Josephine Ronchetti Morigi. He apprenticed under his stone carver father, beginning at age 11, and studied at the Accademia di Belle Arti di Brera in Milan. He emigrated to the United States in 1927, and worked with his father on projects in New Haven, Connecticut and elsewhere. He was hired as a carver by the John Donnelly Company, and moved to Washington, D.C. in 1932 to work on the U.S. Supreme Court Building.

Morigi carved the eight marble relief panels on the bases of the twin lampstands that flank the Supreme Court's plaza. He may have carved the marble portions of the twin flagpole bases. He did interior work on the building, including carving in marble sculptor Adolph A. Weinman's larger-than-life relief sculpture of Moses—one of eighteen figures in the Courtroom's Great Lawmakers of History Frieze.

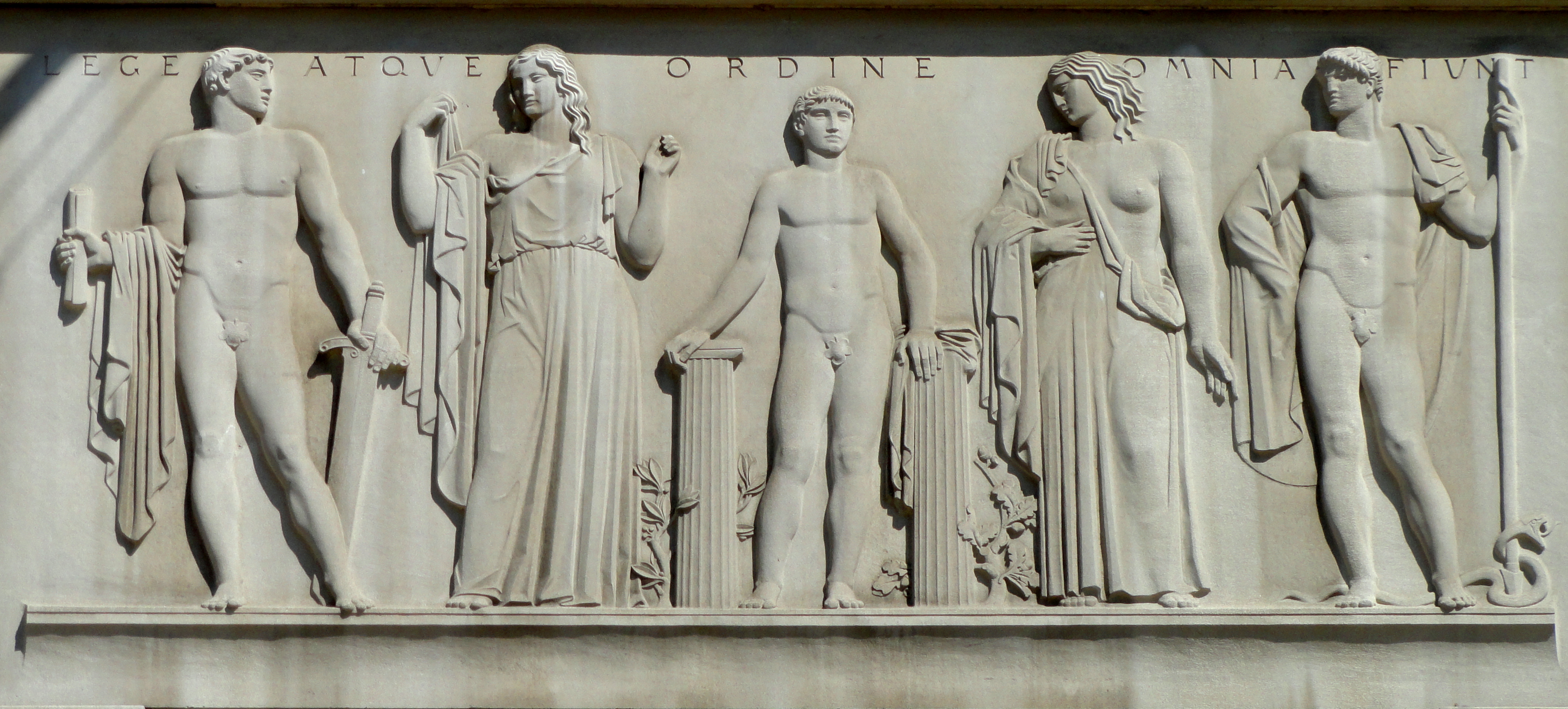
Lege Atque Ordine Omnia Fiunt architrave (1935), C. Paul Jennewein, sculptor, Robert F. Kennedy Department of Justice Building.

Sculptor C. Paul Jennewein modeled The Four Elements, a set of Art Deco female nudes, for the fifth-floor lobby of what is now the Robert F. Kennedy Department of Justice Building. Morigi carved the allegorical figures in limestone, assisted by Bruno Mankowski and William Kapp. They all collaborated (with Otto Thieleman) on carving in limestone Jennewein's Lege Atque Ordine Omnia Fiunt architrave over the building's Constitution Avenue entrance.

For the entrance to what is now the E. Barrett Prettyman Federal Courthouse, Jennewein modeled the Trylon of Freedom, a 24-foot (7.32 m), three-sided freestanding column. Each side represented a branch of the federal government, illustrated in relief vignettes. Morigi was its principal carver, with assistance from contractor Vincent Torelli. Jennewein also modeled four half-life-sized allegorical figures representing The Four Freedoms for one of the courtrooms, and Morigi carved them in marble.

== Washington National Cathedral ==
Morigi began work as a carver at the National Cathedral in 1950, and was promoted to master carver in 1956, a position he held for 22 years. "Highly respected, he was a temperamental perfectionist who didn't tolerate incompetence and wasn't shy about sharing his opinions."

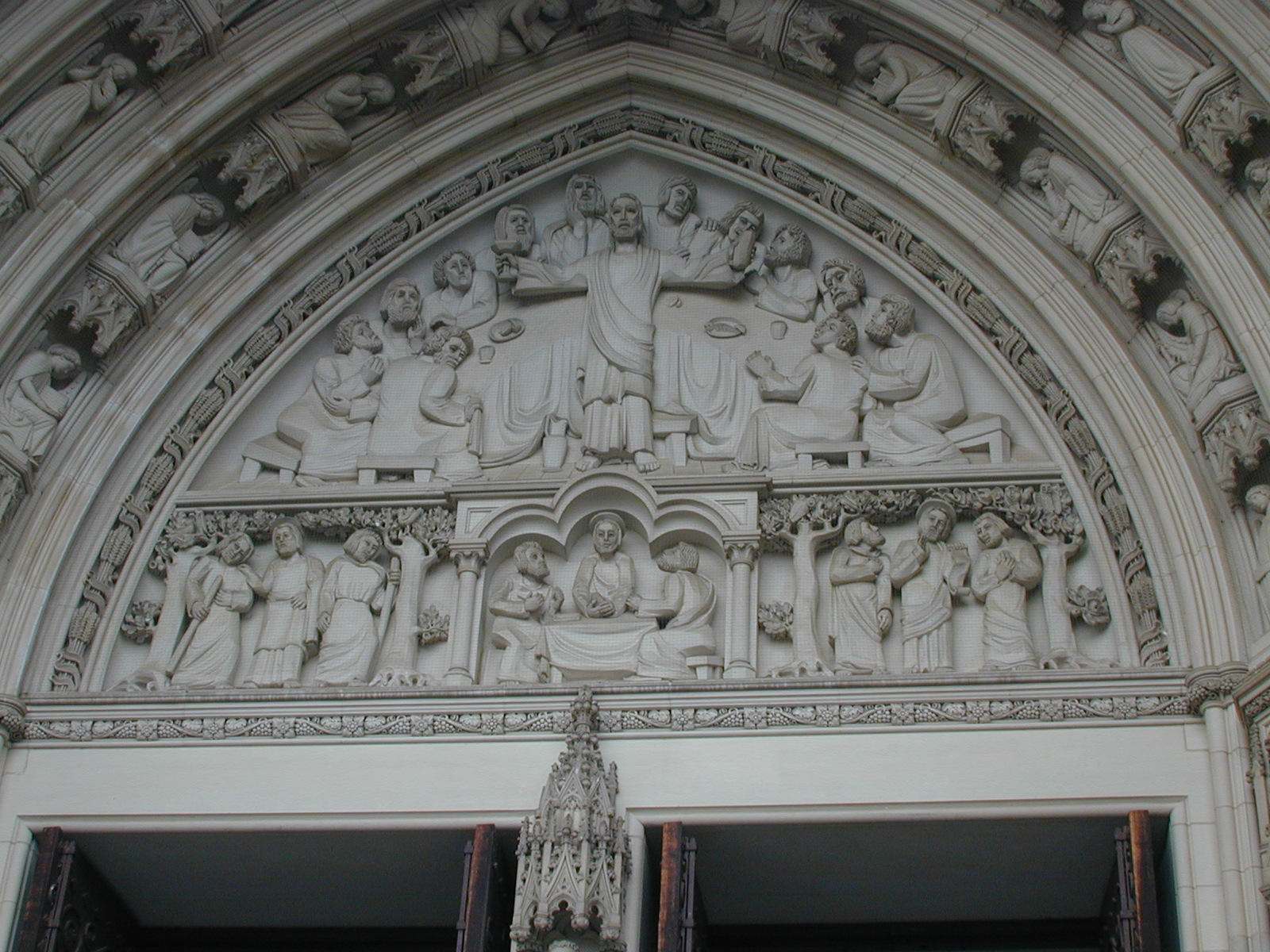
The Last Supper Tympanum (1953–1959), Heinz Warneke, sculptor, Washington National Cathedral.

Sculptor Heinz Warneke modeled the tympanum for the South Portal. It featured a tableau of The Last Supper and a three-panel frieze of The Road to Emmaus. Morigi (with Edward H. Ratti) carved the limestone tympanum in situ from scaffolding. Warneke modeled his Saint Alban trumeau figure for the pier below it, and Morigi carved the figure in limestone. Morigi himself later modeled and carved in situ (with Frank Zic) the 44 angels of the Nature of Christ archivolt, that surround the tympanum.

Warneke modeled and Morigi carved a stone in memory of Joseph Ratti, one of the cathedral's carvers, who died in a 1955 fall from scaffolding. Located inside the south transept, the memorial stone depicts Ratti carving a never-to-be-finished gargoyle.

Sculptor Walker Hancock modeled the altarpiece for the Good Shepherd Chapel in 1957, and Morigi carved it in limestone. Hancock would later model the central figure of Christ in Majesty for the High Altar, which Morigi carved in limestone (with Frank Zic).

In the 1950s and 1960s, Morigi carved the Saints of All Nations series, a set of half-life-sized limestone niche figures. Many of these were modeled by sculptor Marian Brackenridge, three by William McVey, two by Hancock, and the rest by a variety of sculptors. Each figure took Morigi about a month to carve. They were installed on ornate corbels above the pointed arches of the Nave's north and south side aisles.

=== Frederick Hart ===
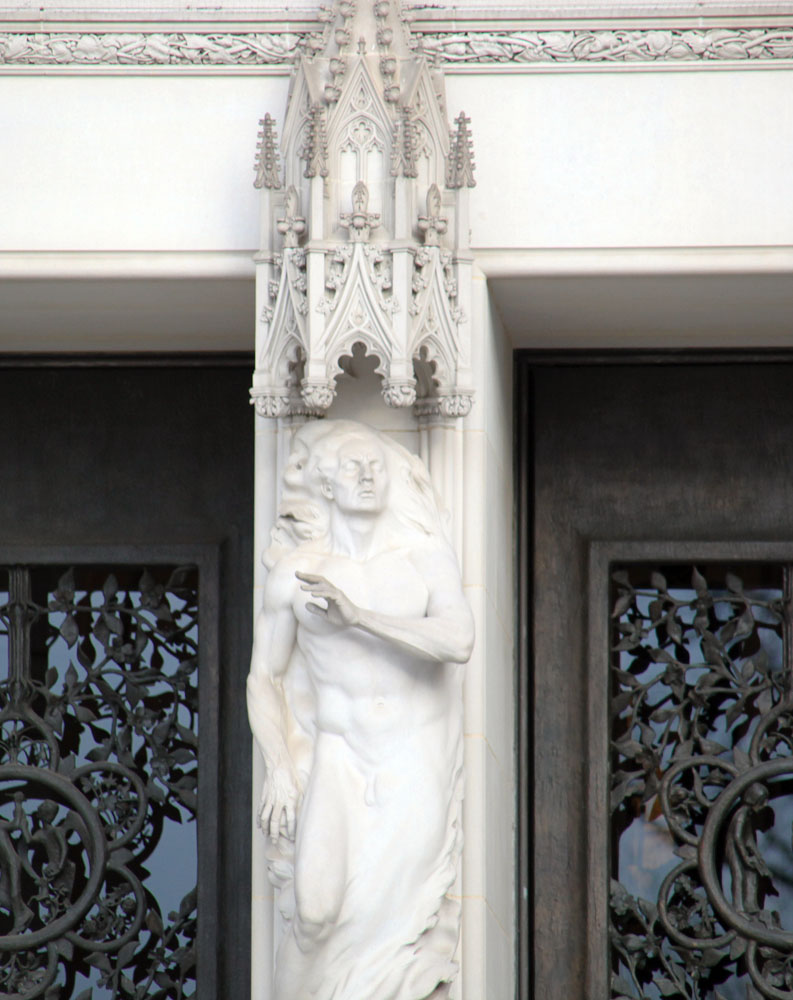
Adam (1974–1978), Frederick Hart, sculptor, West Portal, Washington National Cathedral.

After being rejected several times by Morigi, a 23-year-old Frederick Hart began an apprenticeship under him in 1967. Morigi started his student with minor challenges, carving floral or geometric work or ceiling bosses, and gradually gave him more responsibility.

Instead of traditional scenes from The Last Judgement over the western entrance, the Cathedral chose the theme of Creation. Morigi encouraged Hart to enter the 1971 design competition to create the three tympana for the West Portal. Following three years and multiple rounds of revisions, Hart was awarded the commission.

Hart's groundbreaking design for the central tympanum, Ex Nihilo ("out of nothing"), features nebulous human figures floating in a swirling mass. Morigi carved Hart's related trumeau figure of Adam (1974–1978) – eyes closed, not yet fully formed, "still in a state of becoming" – for the pier between the cathedral's main doors. Adam was the last work Morigi completed prior to retirement—he quipped: "I finished where God began."

=== Personal ===
Vincent Palumbo succeeded Morigi as the cathedral's master carver in 1978. Folklorist Marjorie Hunt spent years interviewing the carvers, and made them the subject of her PhD dissertation. She interviewed Morigi and Palumbo in The Stone Carvers: Master Craftsmen of Washington National Cathedral, a 1984 documentary film by Paul Wagner, that won the 1985 Academy Award for Best Documentary Short Subject. Hunt adapted her work into a 1999 book.

Morigi lived in Hyattsville, Maryland, with his wife Louise and children Francis and Elayne. He was an avid golfer. Carver John Guarente caricatured Morigi in a 1960s gargoyle, portraying him as a devil holding carving tools and wearing a golf cap. To depict Morigi's notorious temper, Guarente carved a mushroom cloud bursting out of the top of his head. "The Master Carver Gargoyle" has become one of the cathedral's most popular sculptures.

Morigi died January 12, 1995, of emphysema.

On January 18, 1995, Senator Strom Thurmond eulogized Roger Morigi on the floor of the U.S. Senate:

With each project he completed, not only did Mr. Morigi create a piece of artwork, he improved his skills and knowledge, which helped him to earn the title of "master stone carver emeritus" and to be characterized by some as the "greatest carver of the 20th Century." Perhaps more importantly, he used his talents to craft pieces that beautified and paid a lasting tribute to his adopted homeland, the United States. While this great artist will be missed, his creations will ensure that he is never forgotten.

== Morigi quotes ==
- "A stone carver is inclined to be an honest man. An executive may embellish his résumé, but a stone carver's work is there for all to see. No matter how well he writes, it does not change the quality of the carving."
- "You don't teach anybody to carve. You give them the fundamentals of carving, like you take a hammer and a point and you hit, you take a chisel and cut. But the main thing in carving, you steal carving. ... [Y]ou have two or three carvers working in the same place, so you watch one, you watch the other; you steal a little bit from one, you steal a little bit from the other. Then you put it all together yourself. You develop your own technique."
- "Technique is different one man to another. Two, three, four, five carvers can carve the same thing, but every one of them would have a different touch, what we call a touch, you know, a certain technique that differentiates the one from the other one and the other one. It's just like you sign your own name."
- "The drawing is the most important thing. The architect makes the drawing, and you've got to go by that. You're not doing it on your own. Each stone has its own design. Each stone has to fit."
- "You have to have the ability to understand and interpret each different sculptor's style. You have to change your own technique to please the sculptor. When you work [from] a model, you've got to pay attention to the form and get the form like the model. You can't stick the stone back like clay. You cut one time, and that's it; it's down on the floor. You've got to restrain yourself and be sure that you do what's in the model, that you copy the model to perfection."
- "You cut and cut and all of a sudden you see something grow. The more you work, the better it comes out. You feel good inside. You work, it gets brilliant, you see it move. I don't know, it fills you with some kind of emotion—such a sense of satisfaction."

== Selected works ==
=== Washington, D.C. Federal Buildings ===
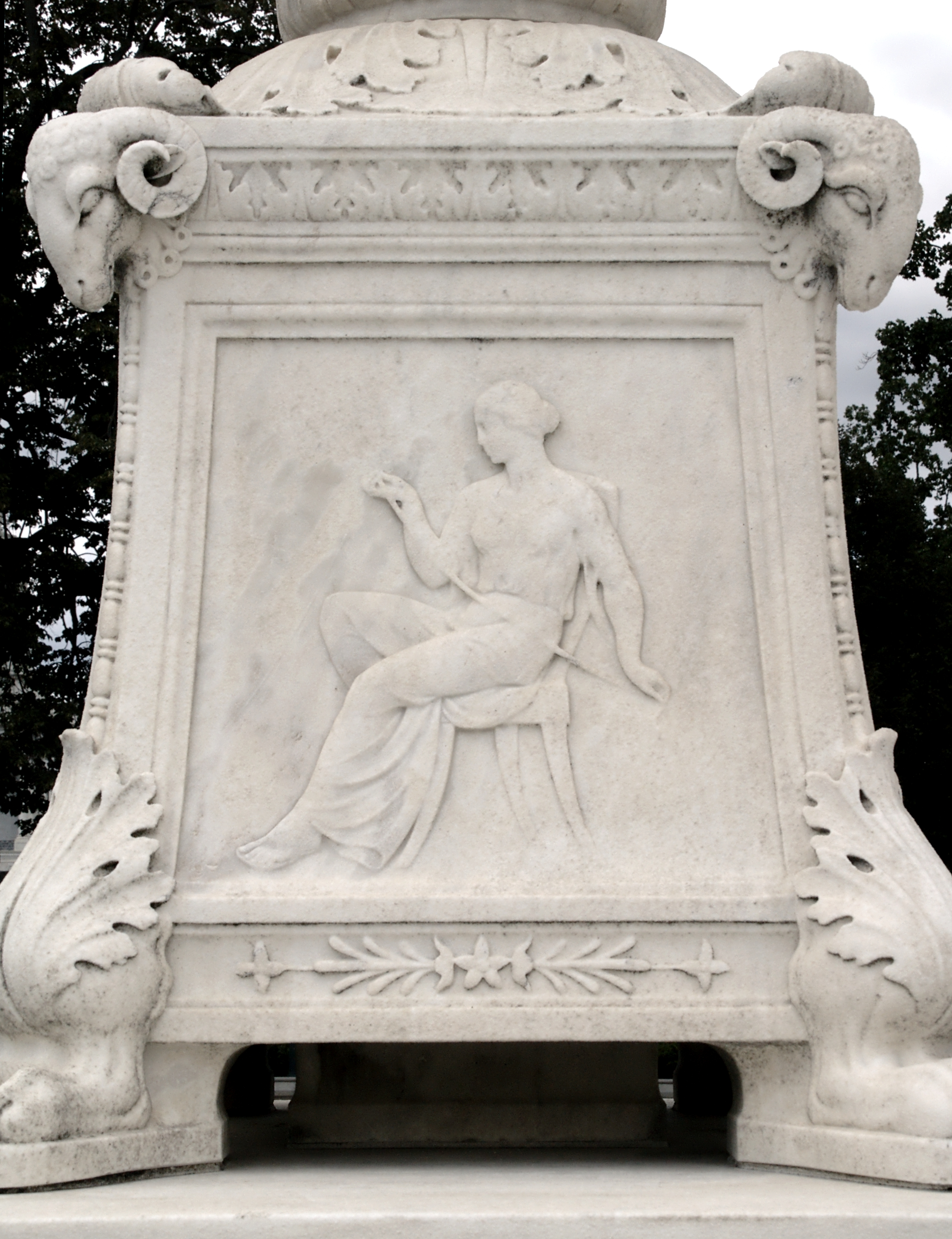
Lachesis relief panel (1935), lampstand, U.S. Supreme Court Building.

United States Supreme Court Building

- 2 lampstands (marble, 1935), carved by the John Donnelly Company.
  - 8 relief panels (4 per lampstand base), carved by Morigi.
- Moses (marble, 1935), Adolph A. Weinman, sculptor, Morigi, carver. Part of the Courtroom's Great Lawmakers of History Frieze.

U.S. Department of Agriculture Administration Building

- Shepherd and His Flock

Department of Commerce Building

- Foreign and Domestic Commerce pediment (limestone, 1934), James Earle Fraser, sculptor, carved by the John Donnelly Company.

Department of the Post Office Building

- Transmission of the Mail by Day and by Night relief panels (limestone, 1932–1934), Adolph A. Weinman, sculptor, Anthony de Francisci, modeler, carved by the John Donnelly Company.
  - Day, male figure flying beside an eagle
  - Night, female figure flying beside an owl
- The Spirit of Progress and Civilization pediment (limestone, 1934), Adolph A. Weinman, sculptor, carved by the John Donnelly Company.

Department of Labor Building

- Abundance and Industry pediment (limestone, 1935), Sherry Fry, sculptor
- Commerce and Communication pediment (limestone, 1935), Wheeler Williams, sculptor.

Robert F. Kennedy Department of Justice Building

- Lege Atque Ordine Omnia Fiunt architrave (limestone, 1935), C. Paul Jennewein, sculptor, William Kapp, Bruno Mankowski, Roger Morini & Otto Thieleman, carvers.
- The Four Elements: Air, Earth, Water, Fire (limestone, 1933–1936), C. Paul Jennewein, sculptor, Morigi, carver (with Bruno Mankowski & William Kapp).
Air (1936), one of the Four Elements, C. Paul Jennewein, sculptor, Robert F. Kennedy Department of Justice Building, Washington, D.C.

Earth (1936), one of the Four Elements, C. Paul Jennewein, sculptor, Robert F. Kennedy Department of Justice Building, Washington, D.C.

Water (1936), one of the Four Elements, C. Paul Jennewein, sculptor, Robert F. Kennedy Department of Justice Building, Washington, D.C.

Fire (1936), one of the Four Elements, C. Paul Jennewein, sculptor, Robert F. Kennedy Department of Justice Building, Washington, D.C.

=== E. Barrett Prettyman Federal Courthouse ===
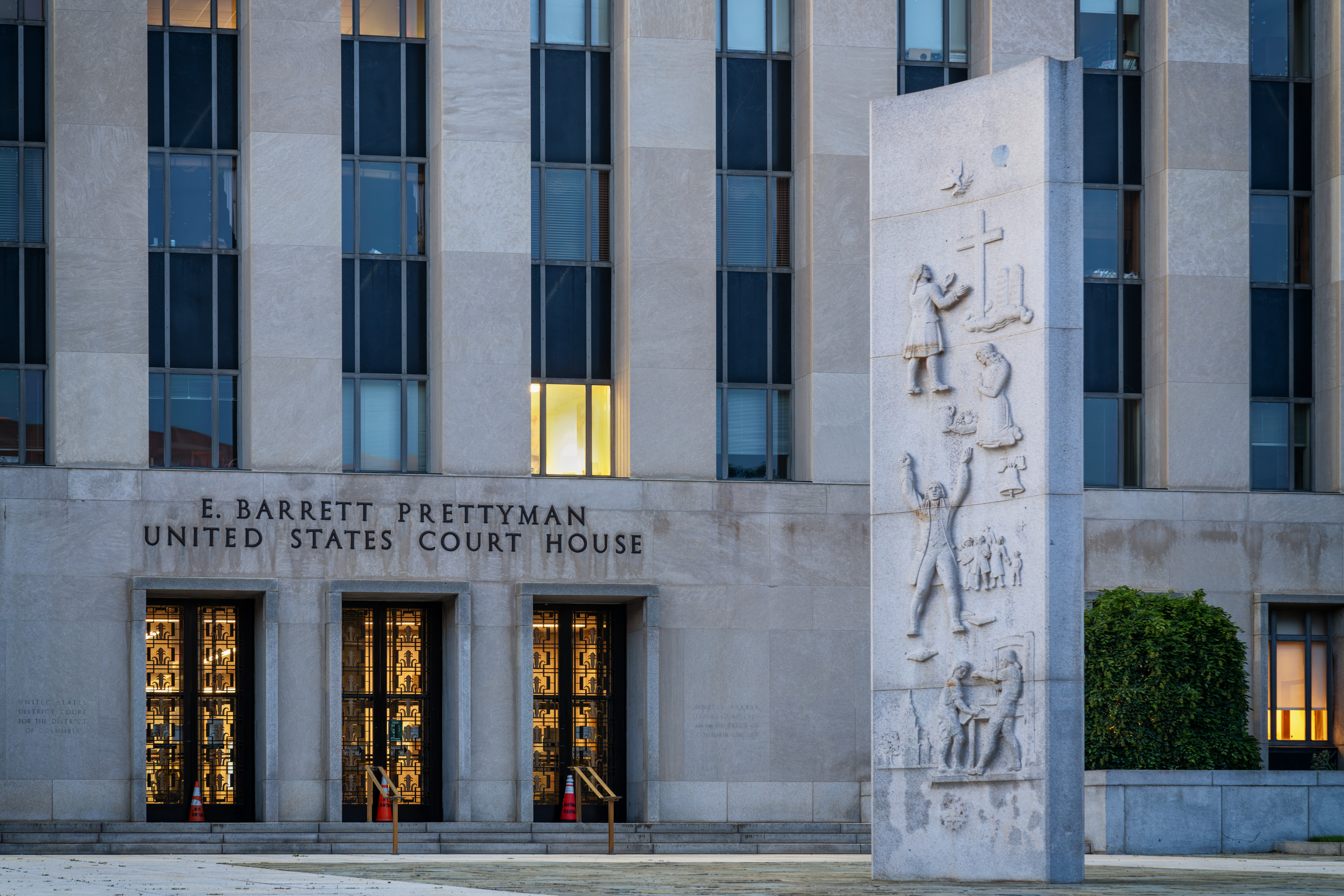
Trylon of Freedom (1954), C. Paul Jennewein, sculptor, E. Barrett Prettyman Federal Courthouse.

- Trylon of Freedom (limestone, 1954), C. Paul Jennewein, sculptor, Morigi, carver, Vincent Tonelli, contractor. The three sides of the freestanding column represent the three branches of the federal government.
- The Four Freedoms: Religion, Speech, Assembly, Press (marble, year), four half-life-sized allegorical figures.

=== Washington National Cathedral ===
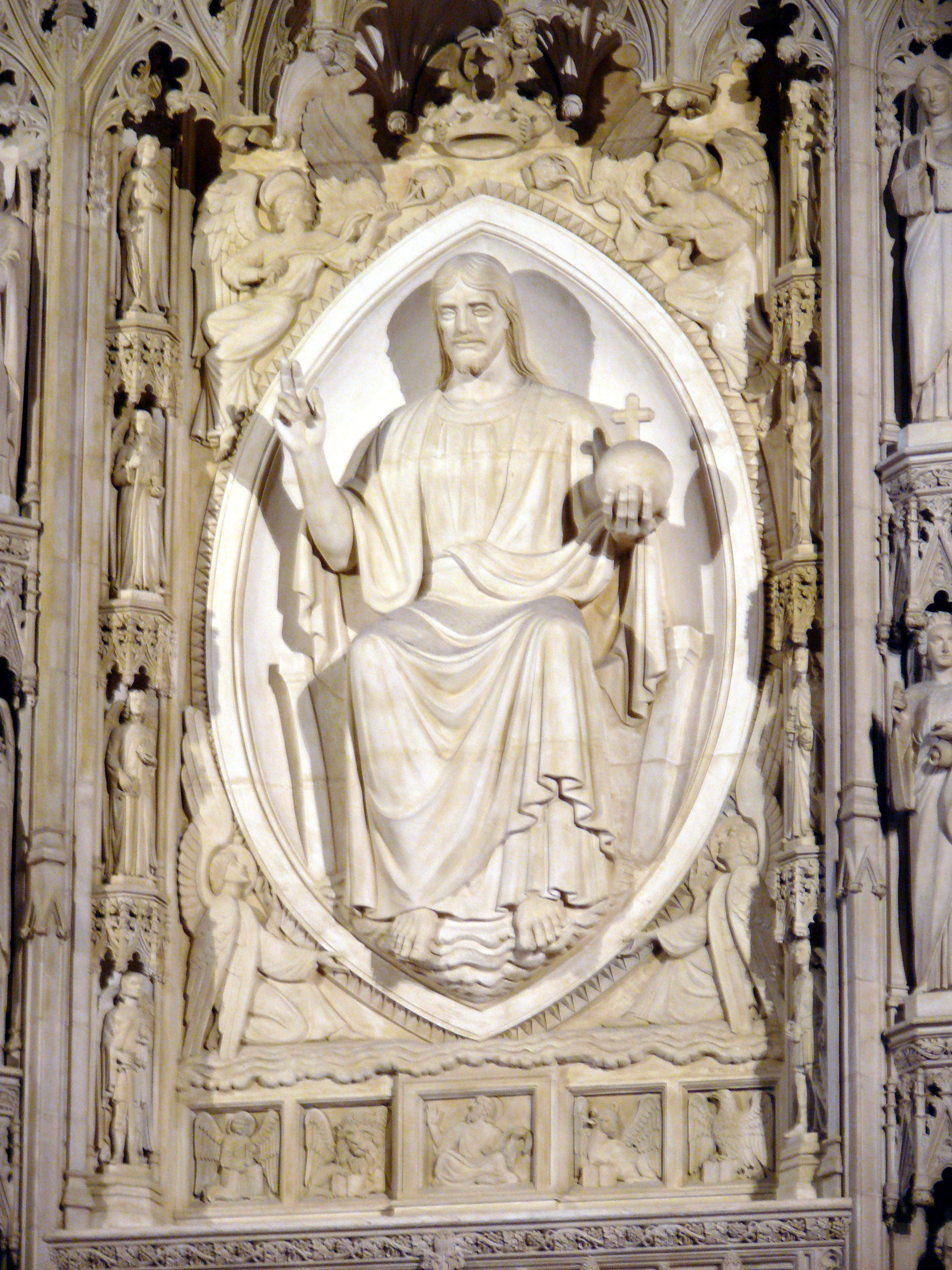
Christ in Majesty (1967–1972), Walker Hancock, sculptor, Jerusalem Altar, Washington National Cathedral.

- South Portal:
  - The Last Supper Tympanum (limestone, 1953–1959), Heinz Warneke, sculptor, Morigi, carver (with Edward H. Ratti).
  - The Road to Emmaus Frieze (limestone, 1953–1959), Heinz Warneke, sculptor, Morigi, carver (with Edward H. Ratti).
  - Saint Alban (limestone, 1959–1961), trumeau figure, Heinz Warneke, sculptor, Morigi, carver.
  - The Nature of Christ Archivolt – "44 Angels" (limestone, 1966–1971), modeled & carved by Morigi (with Frank Zic).
- Saints of All Nations:
  - Saint Andrew of Scotland (limestone, 1956), Wilson Bay, Marian Brackenridge, sculptor, Morigi, carver.
  - John Calvin (limestone, 1956), Wilson Bay, Marian Brackenridge, sculptor, Morigi, carver.
  - Saint Joan of Arc (limestone, 1957), Mellon Bay, Marian Brackenridge, sculptor, Morigi, carver.
  - Saint Patrick of Ireland (limestone, 1959), Mellon Bay, Marian Brackenridge, sculptor, Morigi, carver.
  - Saint Francis of Assisi (limestone, 1959), Humanitarian Bay, Marian Brackenridge, sculptor, Morigi, carver.
  - Saint Stephen of Hungary (limestone, 1960), Carl L. Bush, sculptor, Morigi, carver.
  - Saint Olaf of Norway (limestone, 1962), Humanitarian Bay, Stinius Fredriksen, sculptor, Morigi, carver.
  - Saint Teresa of Avila (limestone, 1964), N.C.A. Bay, Joseph Coletti, sculptor, Morigi, carver.
  - Ulrich Zwingli (limestone, 1965), Lee-Jackson Bay, Walker Hancock, sculptor, Morigi, carver.
  - Isabella Thoburn (limestone, 1966), N.C.A. Bay, Marian Brackenridge, sculptor, Morigi, carver.
  - Martin Luther (limestone, 1967), Lee-Jackson Bay, Walker Hancock, sculptor, Morigi, carver.
  - Saint Margaret of Scotland (limestone, year), Churchill Porch, William McVey, sculptor, Morigi, carver.
  - Jan Hus of Bohemia (limestone, year), Wilson Bay, William McVey, sculptor, Morigi, carver.
  - Saint Olga of Kiev (limestone, year), William McVey, sculptor, Morigi, carver.
  - Saint Birgitta of Sweden (limestone, year), Dulin Bay, William Conrad Severson, sculptor, Morigi, carver.
  - Soren Kierkegaard (limestone, 1977), Dulin Bay, William Conrad Severson, sculptor, Morigi, carver.
  - Saint Junípero Serra (limestone, year), White Bay, Morigi, carver.
  - Kagawa Toyohiko of Japan (limestone, 1978), Bay, Frederick Hart, sculptor, Morigi, carver.
- Christ the Good Shepherd Altarpiece (limestone, 1957), Good Shepherd Chapel, Walker Hancock, sculptor, Morigi, carver.
- Christ in Majesty (limestone, 1967–1972), over High Altar, Walker Hancock, sculptor, Morigi, carver (with Frank Zic).
- George Washington Tympanum (limestone, year), Washington Bay, Lee Lawrie, sculptor, Morigi, carver. Depicts Washington as a farmer and as a soldier.
- Adam (limestone, 1974–1978), trumeau figure, West Portal, Frederick Hart, sculptor, Morigi, carver. This was the last piece Roger Morigi carved for the National Cathedral. Frederick Hart's famous tympanum, Ex Nihilo (1978-84, carved by Vincent Palumbo), is directly above Adam.
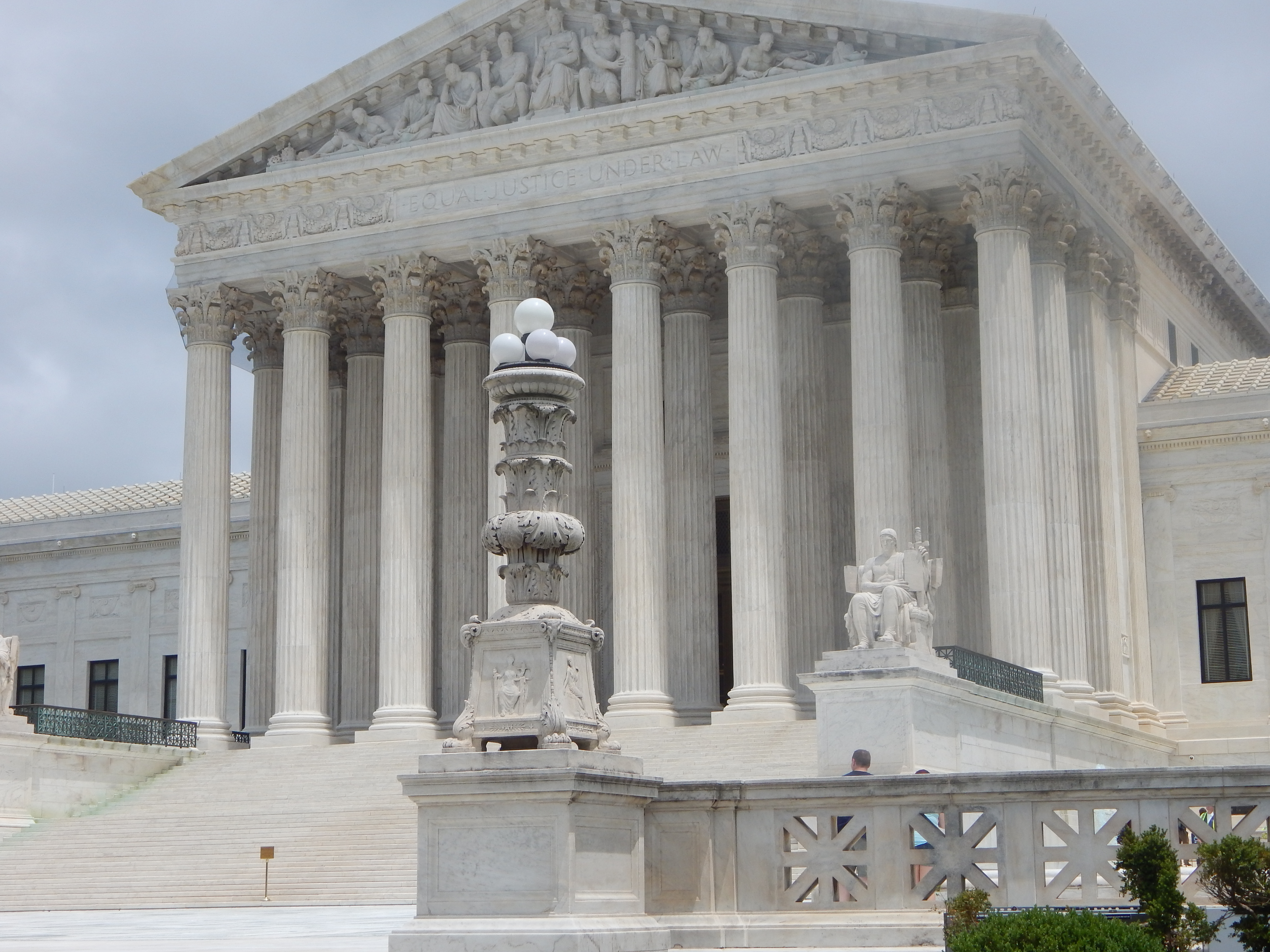
Lampstand (foreground) (1935), U.S. Supreme Court Building.

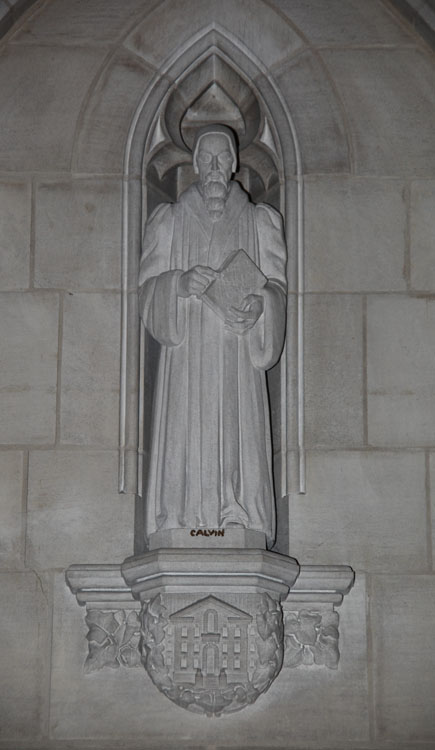
John Calvin (1956), Marian Brackenridge, sculptor, Washington National Cathedral.

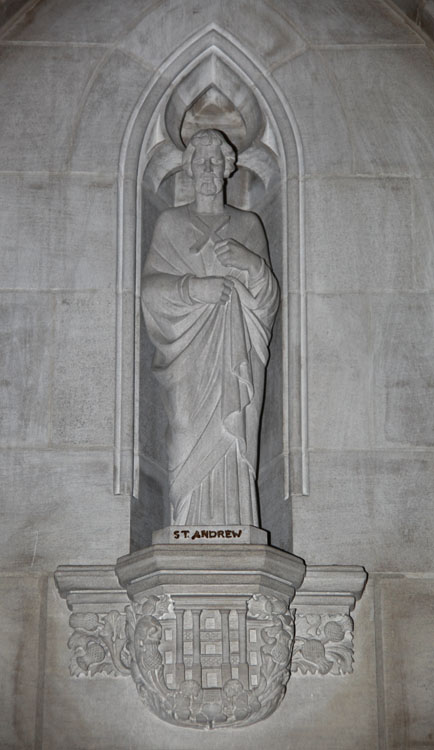
Saint Andrew (1956), Marian Brackenridge, sculptor, Washington National Cathedral.

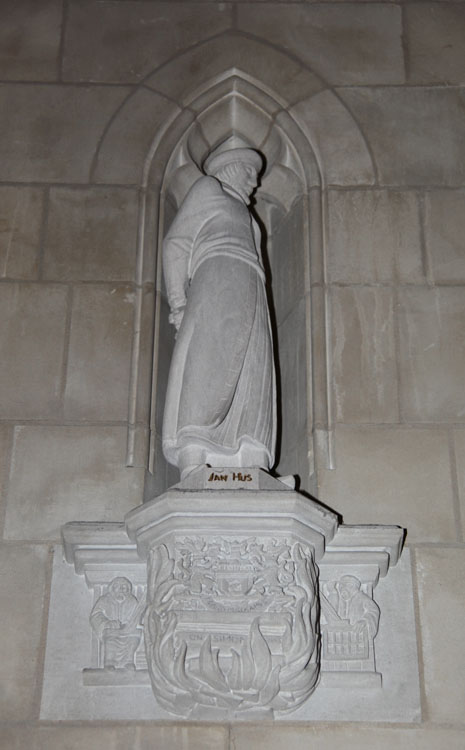
Jan Hus of Bohemia (year), William McVey, sculptor, Washington National Cathedral.
