= Porto Ceresio =

Porto Ceresio Pòrt Cerési
- Comune
- Comune di Porto Ceresio
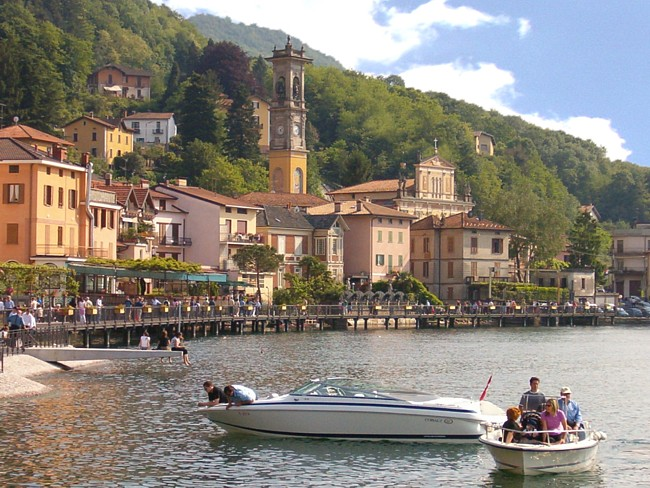
- Porto Ceresio

- Location within Italy Location within Lombardy
- Coordinates: 45°54′N 8°54′E
- Country: Italy
- Region: Lombardy
- Province: Province of Varese (VA)

Area
  - Total: 5.1 km^{2} (2.0 sq mi)

Population (Dec. 2004)
  - Total: 3,080
  - Density: 600/km^{2} (1,600/sq mi)
- Time zone: UTC+1 (CET)
  - Summer (DST): UTC+2 (CEST)
- Postal code: 21050
- Dialing code: 0332

Porto Ceresio (Varesino: Pòrt Cerési) is a comune (municipality) on Lake Lugano in the Province of Varese in the Italian region Lombardy, located about 50 kilometres (31 miles) northwest of Milan and about 11 km (7 mi) northeast of Varese, on the border with Switzerland. As of 31 December 2004, it had a population of 3,080 and an area of 5.1 square kilometres (2.0 sq mi).

Porto Ceresio borders the following municipalities: Besano, Brusimpiano, Brusino Arsizio (Switzerland), Cuasso al Monte, Meride (Switzerland), Morcote (Switzerland). The Comune is situated not far away from the Cinque Vette Park

== Demographic evolution ==
Historical population

Year	Pop.	±%
1861	772	—
1871	788	+2.1%
1881	874	+10.9%
1901	912	+4.3%
1911	1,045	+14.6%

Year	Pop.	±%
1921	1,117	+6.9%
1931	1,233	+10.4%
1936	1,087	−11.8%
1951	1,710	+57.3%
1961	2,175	+27.2%

Year	Pop.	±%
1971	2,980	+37.0%
1981	2,929	−1.7%
1991	2,959	+1.0%
2001	3,068	+3.7%

Source: Data from ISTAT

== Twin towns ==
- Augustów, Poland
