= Davide Antonio Fossati =

Italian painter

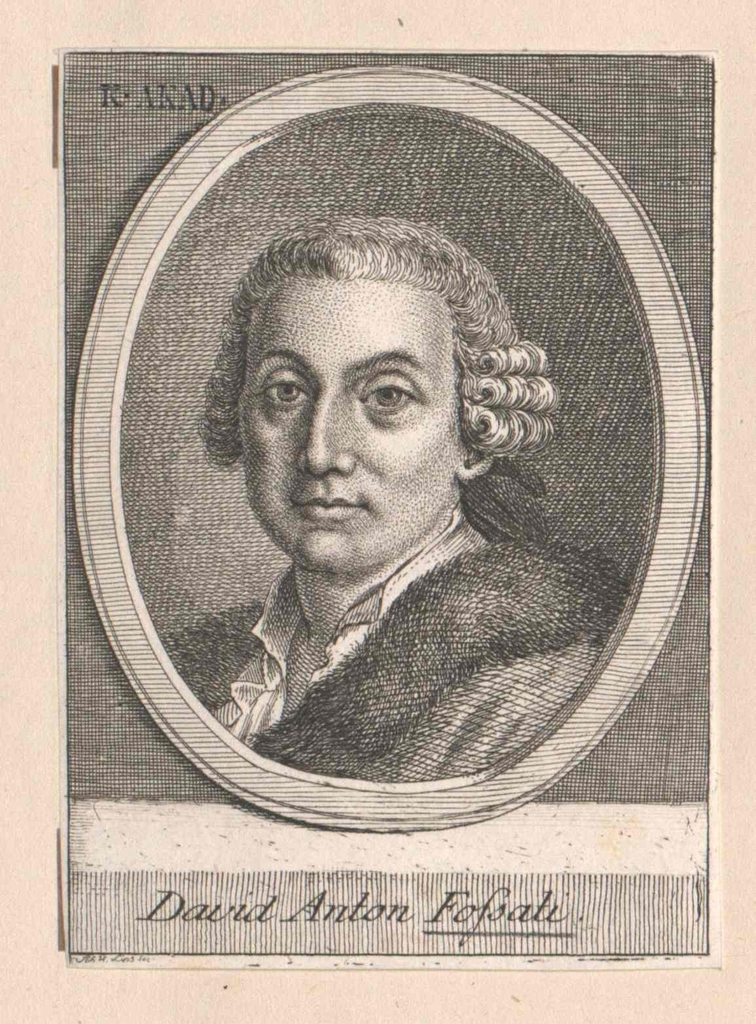
David Anton Fossati

Davide Antonio Fossati, a painter and etcher, was bom at Morcote, Ticino, Switzerland in 1708, and studied drawing under Vicenzo Maria Mariotti at Venice, and painting under Daniel Gran, with whom in 1723 he went to Vienna. In 1728 he painted the dining-hall in the monastery of St. Martinsberg at Pressburg; but in 1730 he returned to Venice, and in the next year executed the wall-paintings in the villa at Torre, near Este, as also in the nunnery of Santa Margaretta, near Lauis. He afterwards took to etching, but did not succeed at first. His death occurred at Vienna in 1795. His works as a painter are little known, but he has left among his later and happier efforts several etchings of landscapes and historical subjects after various masters.

The following are his plates most worthy of notice:

- Diana and Calisto; after Francesco Solimena,
- The Family of Darius before Alexander; after Paolo Veronese.
- Jupiter destroying the Vices; after the same.
- Rebekah and the Servant of Abraham; after Antonio Bellucci.
- The Calling of St. Peter to the Apostleship; after the same.
- A set of twenty-four Views of Venice, and Landscapes; after Marco Ricci.
