= Marian Brackenridge =

American sculptor

Marian Brackenridge (April 16, 1903, Buffalo, New York – March 17, 1999, Sonoma, California) was an American sculptor known for her portrait busts, bas-reliefs and religious works.

== Biography ==
Brackenridge was born in Buffalo, New York, the eldest of the three daughters of William A. and Margaret Brackenridge. Her father was a hydroelectric engineer, who moved the family to Pasadena, California when Marian was six. Her mother was one of the founders of the progressive Westridge School for Girls, where she taught music, and from which Marian graduated in 1921.

Brackenridge attended the Art Students League of New York, where she studied under Leo Lentelli. She returned to California in 1924 for further study under Alexander Phimister Proctor, and moved to Santa Barbara in 1925 to work as an assistant to Ettore Cadorin.

Brackenridge assisted Cadorin on the architectural sculpture for the Santa Barbara County Courthouse (1929), including the seated figures of Justice and Ceres, and the Spirit of the Ocean Fountain. She assisted him on his bronze sculpture of Junípero Serra (1930), for the National Statuary Hall Collection at the U.S. Capitol. She later modeled the portrait relief of Cadorin that marks his grave. Her work was part of the sculpture event in the art competition at the 1932 Summer Olympics.

Brackenridge exhibited two pieces at the National Sculpture Society's 1929 Contemporary American Sculpture exhibition in San Francisco. She exhibited at the 1939-40 Golden Gate International Exposition, also in San Francisco. She exhibited a terra cotta figure of Proserpine at the 1940 National Sculpture Society exhibition in New York City.

Between 1956 and 1976, Brackenridge modeled a series of half-life-sized niche figures for Washington National Cathedral. These were carved in limestone by the Cathedral's master carver, Roger Morigi. They included the figures of Saint Andrew of Scotland and John Calvin that flank the sarcophagus of President Woodrow Wilson. Her Saint Francis of Assisi figure leans forward in his niche, releasing the bird on his palm, a reference to the saint buying caged birds and returning them to the wild. Rather than the traditional armor, her Joan of Arc figure is dressed in peasant clothes, hearing the voice of God for the first time. Her Robert Hunt figure depicts him in simple robes and holding a chalice, giving communion to the settlers at Jamestown.

Brackenridge's most familiar works may be the bronze markers that she modeled for the 1960 centennial of the Pony Express. Large rectangular markers were installed at the 8 stops on its mail route—east to west: St. Joseph, Missouri; Marysville, Kansas; Fort Kearny, Nebraska; Julesburg, Colorado; Fort Laramie, Wyoming; Salt Lake City, Utah; Friday's Station, Nevada; and Sacramento, California. Arched markers were customized to tell the history of a particular site. Round markers were installed at numerous locations along the route.

Brackenridge never married. In 1941, she moved to "La Brenta" – an 1892 California Craftsman-style house & studio at 281 East Napa Street in Sonoma, California – where she lived until her death. A portrait relief of Brackenridge marks her grave in Sonoma's Mountain Cemetery.

== Selected works ==
- Portrait relief of Ettore Cadorin (c.1952), Cadorin grave monument, Mountain Cemetery, Sonoma, California.
- Washington National Cathedral niche figures:
  - Saint Andrew of Scotland (limestone, 1956), Woodrow Wilson Bay.
  - John Calvin (limestone, 1956), Woodrow Wilson Bay.
  - Saint Joan of Arc (limestone, 1957), Mellon Bay.
  - Saint Patrick of Ireland (limestone, 1959), Mellon Bay.
  - Saint Francis of Assisi (limestone, 1959), Humanitarian Bay.
  - Isabella Thoburn (limestone, 1966), N.C.A. Bay.
  - Robert Hunt (limestone, 1976), outside Bethlehem Chapel.
- Pony Express Centennial Markers (bronze, 1960), rectangular, arched, round.
- George Koltanowski Award (bronze, 1961), given annually by the United States Chess Federation, the medallion features a portrait relief of Koltanowski.
- Portrait relief of Francis Scott Key (bronze, 1962), University of North Texas.
- Captain William Smith memorial plaque (1965), Mountain Cemetery, Sonoma, California.
- Portrait relief of Henry Lobdell (painted plaster, 1967), Mead Art Museum, Amherst College.
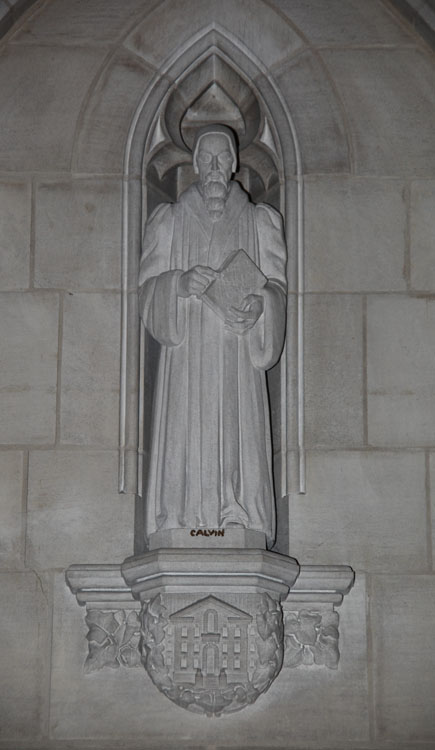
John Calvin (1956), Washington National Cathedral.

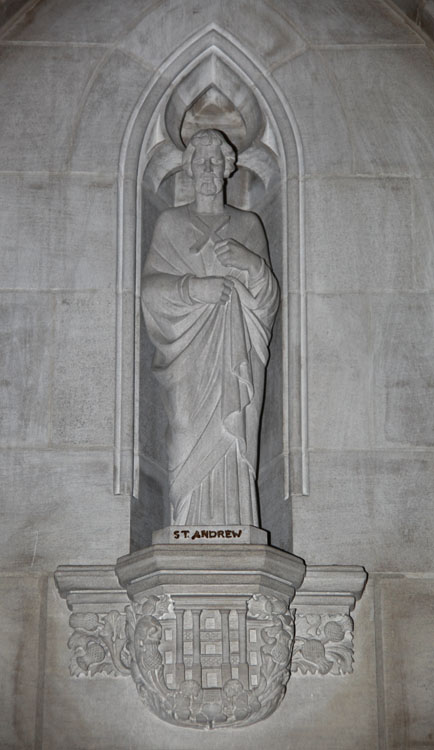
Saint Andrew (1956), Washington National Cathedral.

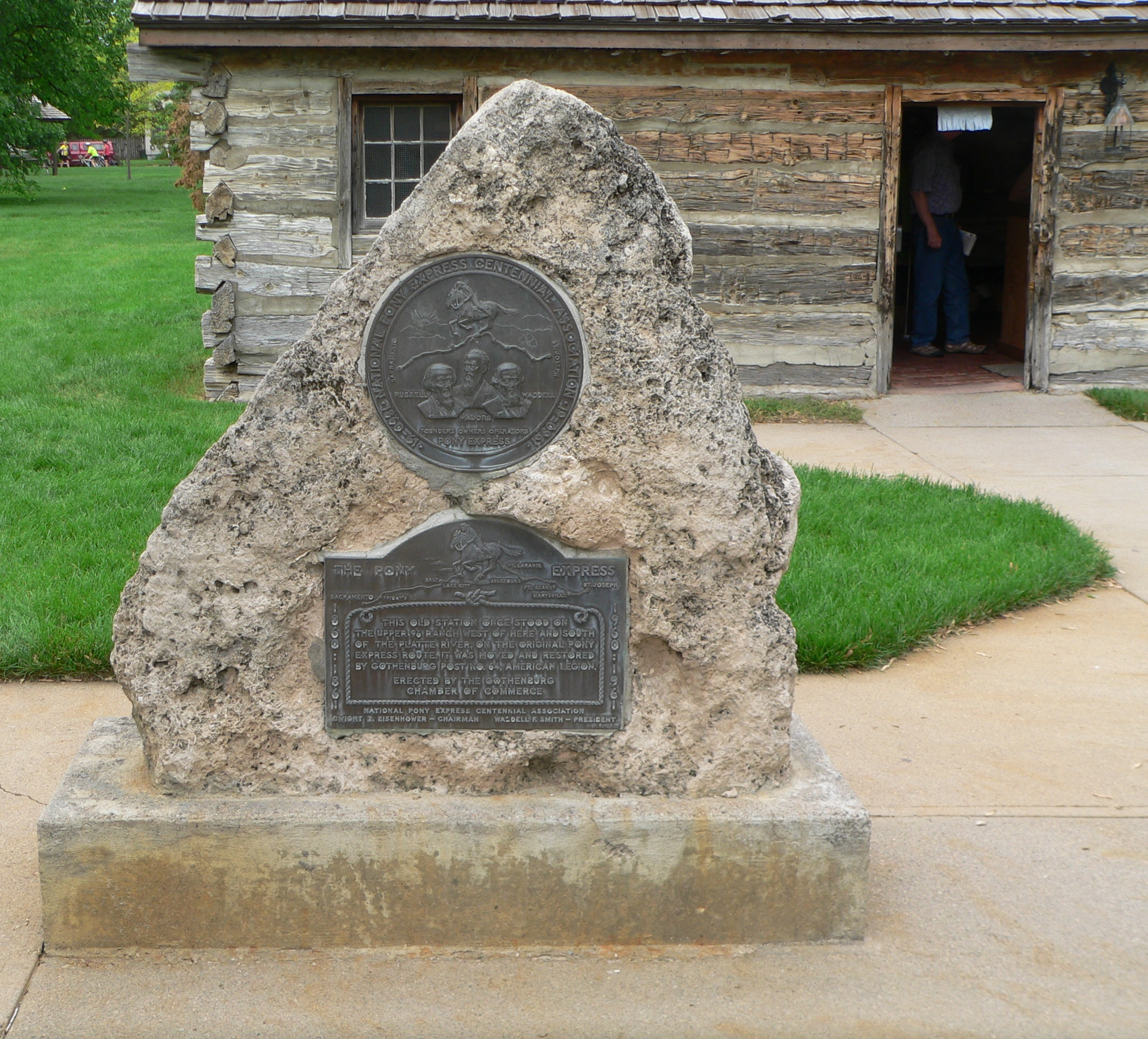
Pony Express Markers (1960), Ehmen Park, Gothenburg, Nebraska.
