= The Stone Carvers (film) =

1984 film

- Directed by: Marjorie Hunt; Paul Wagner
- Written by: Marjorie Hunt; Paul Wagner
- Produced by: Marjorie Hunt; Paul Wagner
- Starring: Vincent Palumbo; Roger Morigi
- Edited by: Paul Wagner; Barr Weissman
- Production company: Paul Wagner Productions
- Distributed by: Direct Cinema
- Release date: 1984
- Running time: 30 minutes
- Country: United States
- Language: English

The Stone Carvers is a 1984 American short documentary film directed by Marjorie Hunt and Paul Wagner and starring Vincent Palumbo and Roger Morigi. In 1985, it won an Oscar for Documentary Short Subject at the 57th Academy Awards.

The film documented the building of the Washington National Cathedral in Washington, D.C.

== Cast ==
- Vincent Palumbo as Himself
- Roger Morigi as Himself
