= Vico Morcote =

- Municipality
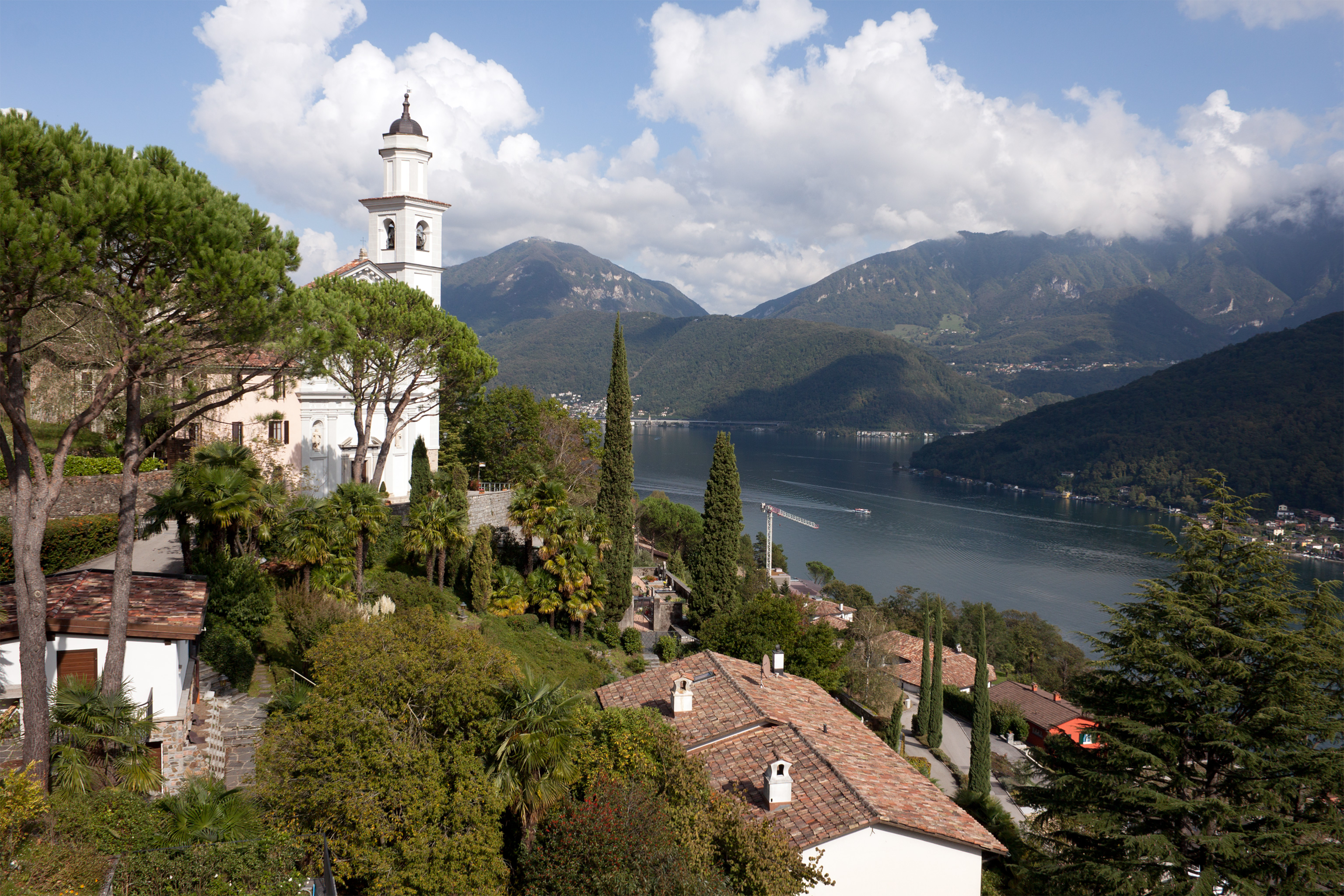

- Flag Coat of arms
- Location of Vico Morcote
- Location within Switzerland Location within Canton of Ticino
- Coordinates: 45°56′N 8°55′E
- Country: Switzerland
- Canton: Ticino
- District: Lugano

Government
  - Mayor: Sindaco; Luido Bernasconi FDP/PRD/PLR

Area
  - Total: 1.91 km^{2} (0.74 sq mi)
- Elevation: 442 m (1,450 ft)

Population (December 2004)
  - Total: 293
  - Density: 153/km^{2} (397/sq mi)
- Time zone: UTC+01:00 (CET)
  - Summer (DST): UTC+02:00 (CEST)
- Postal code: 6921
- SFOS number: 5233
- ISO 3166 code: CH-TI
- Surrounded by: Brusino Arsizio, Lugano, Melide, Morcote
- Website: www.vicomorcote.ch

Vico Morcote is a municipality in the district of Lugano in the canton of Ticino in Switzerland.

== Geography ==
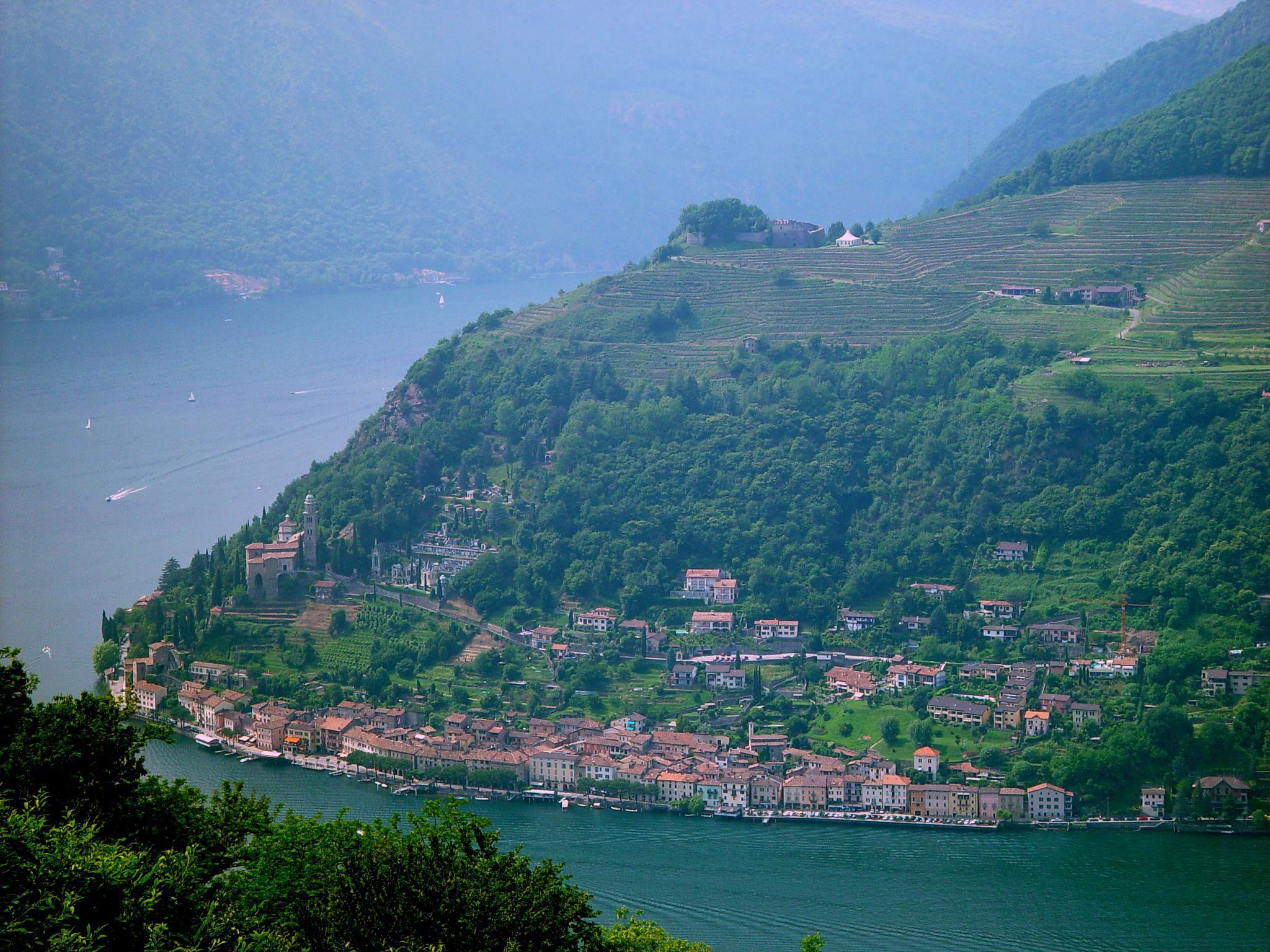
View over Morcote and Lake Lugano

Vico Morcote has an area, as of 1997, of 1.91 square kilometers (0.74 sq mi). Of this area, 0.31 km^{2} (0.12 sq mi) or 16.2% is used for agricultural purposes, while 1.39 km^{2} (0.54 sq mi) or 72.8% is forested. Of the rest of the land, 0.23 km^{2} (0.089 sq mi) or 12.0% is settled (buildings or roads) and 0.03 km^{2} (7.4 acres) or 1.6% is unproductive land.

Of the built up area, housing and buildings made up 9.9% and transportation infrastructure made up 2.1%. Out of the forested land, 71.2% of the total land area is heavily forested and 1.6% is covered with orchards or small clusters of trees. Of the agricultural land, 3.1% is used for growing crops, while 3.1% is used for orchards or vine crops and 9.9% is used for alpine pastures.

Located near Lake Lugano and situated roughly one kilometer uphill from the larger village of Morcote, Vico Morcote's distance from both Morcote and Lugano (10 km (6.2 mi) east) have left it in a near preserved state as a small hillside village typical of the area.

== Coat of arms ==
The blazon of the municipal coat of arms is Azure a spring argent issuing from a base embelif vert and a goat of the second drinking from it.

== Demographics ==
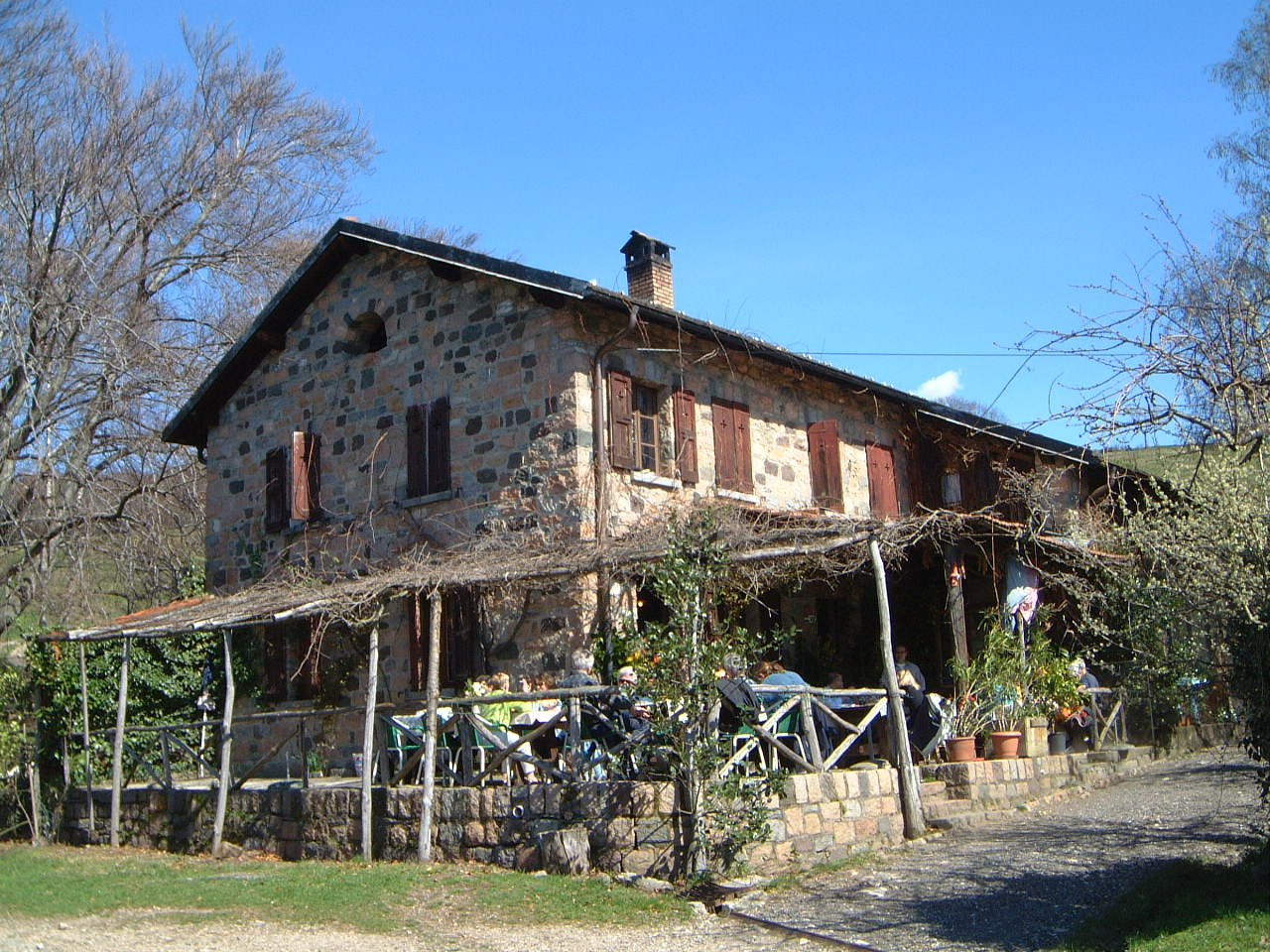
A house in Alpe Vicania, part of Vico Morcote

Aerial view by Walter Mittelholzer (1919)

Vico Morcote has a population (as of December 2020) of 422. As of 2008, 35.3% of the population are resident foreign nationals. Over the last 10 years (1997–2007) the population has changed at a rate of 6.9%.

Most of the population (as of 2000) speaks Italian (66.4%), with German being second most common (22.8%) and French being third (5.2%). Of the Swiss national languages (as of 2000), 57 speak German, 13 people speak French, 166 people speak Italian. The remainder (14 people) speak another language.

As of 2008, the gender distribution of the population was 51.5% male and 48.5% female. The population was made up of 102 Swiss men (30.2% of the population), and 72 (21.3%) non-Swiss men. There were 112 Swiss women (33.1%), and 52 (15.4%) non-Swiss women.

In 2008 there were 2 live births to Swiss citizens and 1 birth to non-Swiss citizens, and in same time span there was 1 death of a Swiss citizen and 1 non-Swiss citizen death. Ignoring immigration and emigration, the population of Swiss citizens increased by 1 while the foreign population remained the same. There was 1 Swiss man and 1 Swiss woman who emigrated from Switzerland. At the same time, there were 5 non-Swiss men and 5 non-Swiss women who immigrated from another country to Switzerland. The total Swiss population change in 2008 (from all sources, including moves across municipal borders) was an increase of 2 and the non-Swiss population change was an increase of 16 people. This represents a population growth rate of 5.5%.

The age distribution, as of 2009, in Vico Morcote is; 33 children or 9.8% of the population are between 0 and 9 years old and 25 teenagers or 7.4% are between 10 and 19. Of the adult population, 36 people or 10.7% of the population are between 20 and 29 years old. 38 people or 11.2% are between 30 and 39, 63 people or 18.6% are between 40 and 49, and 52 people or 15.4% are between 50 and 59. The senior population distribution is 55 people or 16.3% of the population are between 60 and 69 years old, 23 people or 6.8% are between 70 and 79, there are 13 people or 3.8% who are over 80.

As of 2000, there were 129 private households in the municipality, and an average of 1.9 persons per household. In 2000 there were 148 single family homes (or 74.7% of the total) out of a total of 198 inhabited buildings. There were 26 two family buildings (13.1%) and 15 multi-family buildings (7.6%). There were also 9 buildings in the municipality that were multipurpose buildings (used for both housing and commercial or another purpose).

The vacancy rate for the municipality, in 2008, was 0%. In 2000 there were 364 apartments in the municipality. The most common apartment size was the 3 room apartment of which there were 103. There were 21 single room apartments and 83 apartments with five or more rooms. Of these apartments, a total of 129 apartments (35.4% of the total) were permanently occupied, while 235 apartments (64.6%) were seasonally occupied. As of 2007, the construction rate of new housing units was 6.2 new units per 1000 residents.

The historical population is given in the following chart:

== Politics ==
In the 2007 federal election the most popular party was the FDP which received 35.91% of the vote. The next three most popular parties were the SP (19.97%), the SVP (17.71%) and the Ticino League (10.14%). In the federal election, a total of 80 votes were cast, and the voter turnout was 46.0%.

In the 2007 Gran Consiglio election, there were a total of 176 registered voters in Vico Morcote, of which 102 or 58.0% voted. 1 blank ballot and 1 null ballot was cast, leaving 100 valid ballots in the election. The most popular party was the PLRT which received 25 or 25.0% of the vote. The next three most popular parties were; the BastaDiv (with 24 or 24.0%), the SSI (with 15 or 15.0%) and the UDC (with 9 or 9.0%).

In the 2007 Consiglio di Stato election, 2 blank ballots were cast, leaving 100 valid ballots in the election. The most popular party was the PLRT which received 37 or 37.0% of the vote. The next three most popular parties were; the LEGA (with 20 or 20.0%), the PS (with 17 or 17.0%) and the UDC (with 10 or 10.0%).

== Economy ==
As of 2007, Vico Morcote had an unemployment rate of 6.04%. As of 2005, there were people employed in the primary economic sector and about businesses involved in this sector. 1 person was employed in the secondary sector and there was 1 business in this sector. 125 people were employed in the tertiary sector, with 9 businesses in this sector. There were 118 residents of the municipality who were employed in some capacity, of which females made up 42.4% of the workforce.

In 2000, there were 46 workers who commuted into the municipality and 79 workers who commuted away. The municipality is a net exporter of workers, with about 1.7 workers leaving the municipality for every one entering. About 26.1% of the workforce coming into Vico Morcote are coming from outside Switzerland, while 7.6% of the locals commute out of Switzerland for work. Of the working population, 5.1% used public transportation to get to work, and 60.2% used a private car.

As of 2009, there was one hotel in Vico Morcote. Vico Morcote contains a number of small hotels and restaurants. It is also home to a villa run by the International Institute of Architecture (I2A), the European branch of the Southern California Institute of Architecture.

== Religion ==
From the 2000 census, 174 or 69.6% were Roman Catholic, while 36 or 14.4% belonged to the Swiss Reformed Church. There are 34 individuals (or about 13.60% of the population) who belong to another church (not listed on the census), and 6 individuals (or about 2.40% of the population) did not answer the question.

Vico Morcote is the birthplace of Iohannes, Roman legionary father of pope Anicetus, whose mother was Syrian from Emesa.

== Education ==
In Vico Morcote about 77.8% of the population (between age 25-64) have completed either non-mandatory upper secondary education or additional higher education (either university or a Fachhochschule).

In Vico Morcote there were a total of 33 students (as of 2009). The Ticino education system provides up to three years of non-mandatory kindergarten and in Vico Morcote there were 7 children in kindergarten. The primary school program lasts for five years. In the municipality, 10 students attended the standard primary schools. In the lower secondary school system, students either attend a two-year middle school followed by a two-year pre-apprenticeship or they attend a four-year program to prepare for higher education. There were 5 students in the two-year middle school, while 4 students were in the four-year advanced program.

The upper secondary school includes several options, but at the end of the upper secondary program, a student will be prepared to enter a trade or to continue on to a university or college. In Ticino, vocational students may either attend school while working on their internship or apprenticeship (which takes three or four years) or may attend school followed by an internship or apprenticeship (which takes one year as a full-time student or one and a half to two years as a part-time student). There were 4 vocational students who were attending school full-time and 3 who attend part-time.

As of 2000, there were 2 students in Vico Morcote who came from another municipality, while 41 residents attended schools outside the municipality.
