= Morcote =

- Municipality
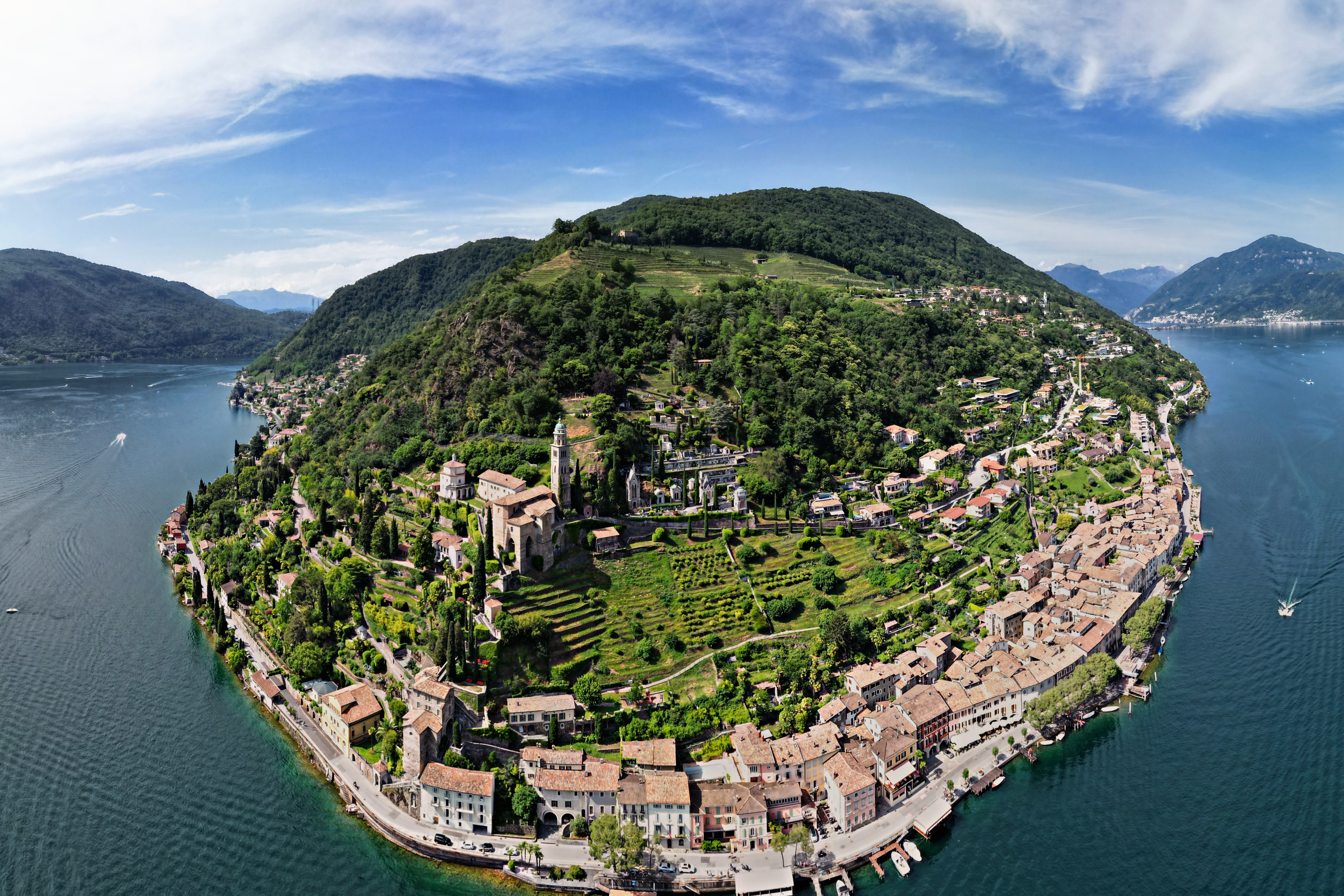

- Flag Coat of arms
- Location of Morcote
- Location within Switzerland Location within Canton of Ticino
- Coordinates: 45°55′N 8°55′E
- Country: Switzerland
- Canton: Ticino
- District: Lugano

Government
  - Mayor: Sindaco; Giacomo Caratti

Area
  - Total: 2.8 km^{2} (1.1 sq mi)
- Elevation: 272 m (892 ft)

Population (December 2007)
  - Total: 755
  - Density: 270/km^{2} (700/sq mi)
- Time zone: UTC+01:00 (CET)
  - Summer (DST): UTC+02:00 (CEST)
- Postal code: 6922
- SFOS number: 5203
- ISO 3166 code: CH-TI
- Surrounded by: Brusimpiano (IT-VA), Brusino Arsizio, Lugano, Porto Ceresio (IT-VA), Vico Morcote
- Twin towns: Viarmes (France)
- Website: www.morcote.ch

Morcote is a municipality in the Swiss canton of Ticino situated about 10 kilometres from Lugano in the district of Lugano on the shore of Lake Lugano.

== History ==
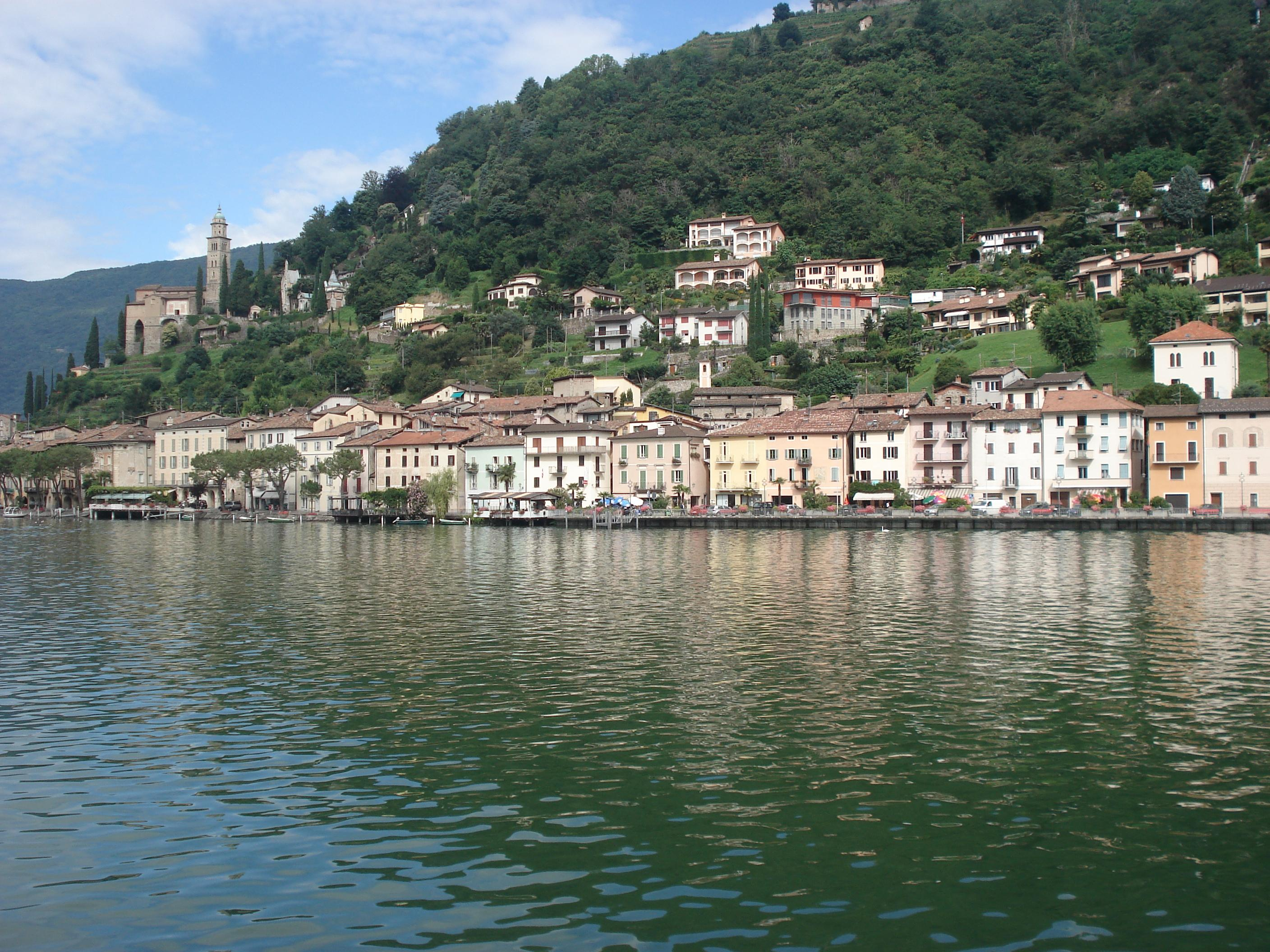
Morcote's lakefront. The town's development and history are connected to the lake

Aerial view from 100 m by Walter Mittelholzer (1929)

Morcote is first mentioned historically in 926 as Murcau, which comes from the Latin Morae caput, meaning head of the hill. In 1353 it was mentioned as Murchoe and again in 1453 as Murchote.

Starting around 1100, Morcote was home to a castle that was built to guard and control commerce on the lake. Until the dam was built in Melide in 1847, Morcote was the largest port on Lake Lugano. Goods from northern Italy were shipped across the lake to the rest of Ticino. In 1422 the town was granted privileges by the Duke of Milan, which included the rights to impose taxes, self-government, independent fishing and the right to hold markets. After the plague year of 1432, only seven families survived in the town. The town was often caught between the rival powers of Milan and Como as they fought for control in Lombardy. In 1517 the region came under the control of the Old Swiss Confederation, and was added to the Vogtei of Lugano. However Morcote retained extensive rights, including judicial and tax autonomy as well as fishing rights over the entire lake.

During the Late Middle Ages the major industries of Morcote included fishing, farming and shipping. During the end of the Middle Ages, artists began to move into the town as well. In 1583 the town had a self-supporting parish established in the parish church Santa Maria del Sasso, which dated from the 13th century.

In 1862, seven houses slid into the lake.

During the 19th century tourism grew into a major industry in Morcote. In the late 20th and early 21st centuries, wine production and handicrafts have been added to tourism.

== Geography ==
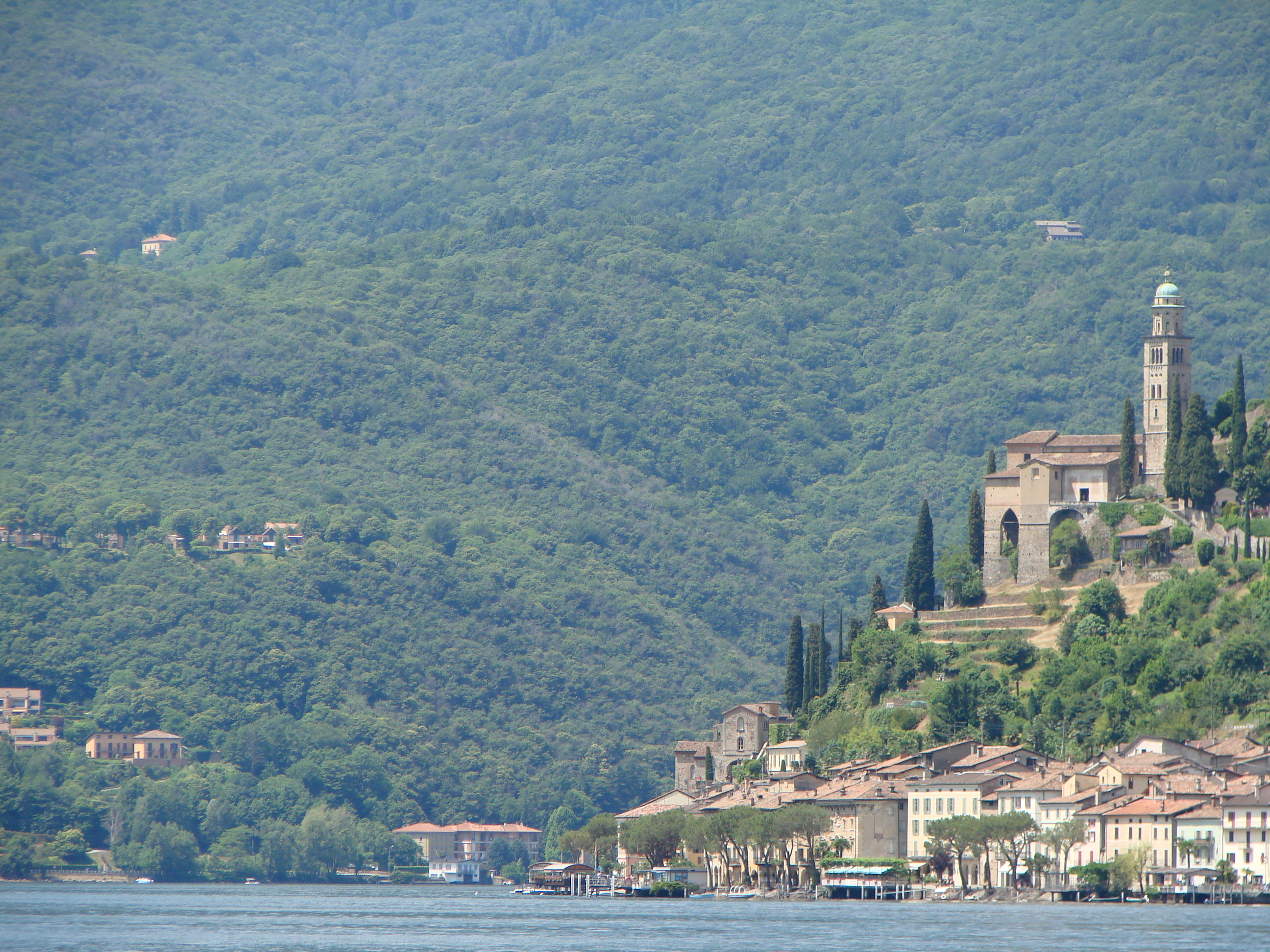
Morcote village

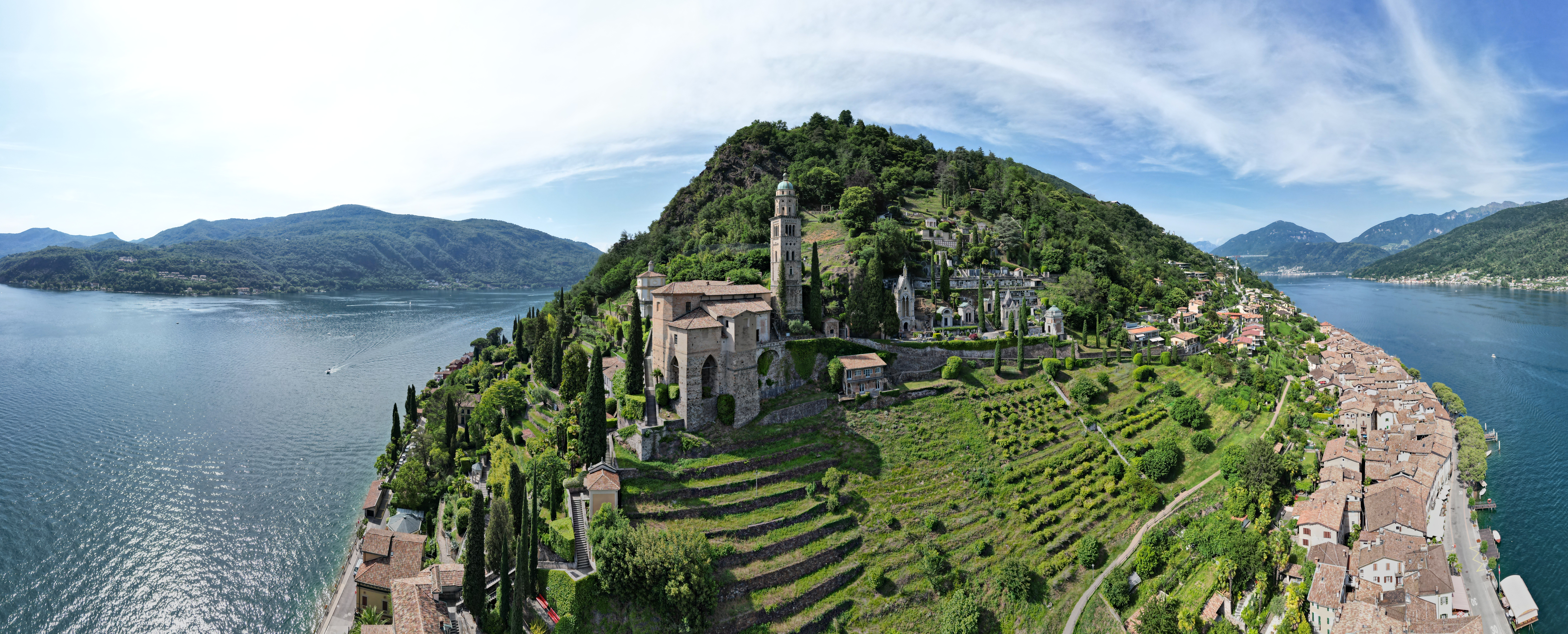
Chiesa di Santa Maria del Sasso (Morcote) from above

Morcote has an area, (as of the 2004/09 survey) of 2.79 km^{2} (1.08 sq mi). Of this area, about 2.5% is used for agricultural purposes, while 81.5% is forested and 16.0% is settled (buildings or roads). In the 2004/09 survey a total of 37 ha (91 acres) or about 13.3% of the total area was covered only with buildings, an increase of 5 ha (12 acres) over the 1983 amount. About 0.72% of the total area is recreational space. Of the agricultural land, 2 ha (4.9 acres) is used for orchards and vineyards, 5 ha (12 acres) is fields and grasslands and 3 ha (7.4 acres) consists of alpine grazing areas. Since 1983 the amount of agricultural land has decreased by 5 ha (12 acres). Over the same time period the amount of forested land has increased by 1 ha (2.5 acres). Despite being on the lake, the borders of the municipality do not include any rivers or lakes.

The municipality is located in the Lugano district, between Lake Lugano and Monte Arbostora. It consists of the village of Morcote, the village of Vico until 1803 and between 1803–16, Carabietta.

== Coat of arms ==
The blazon of the municipal coat of arms is Per fess gules a shepherdess sitting on a garb all argent and vert a sow and her piglets also argent.

== Heritage sites of national significance ==
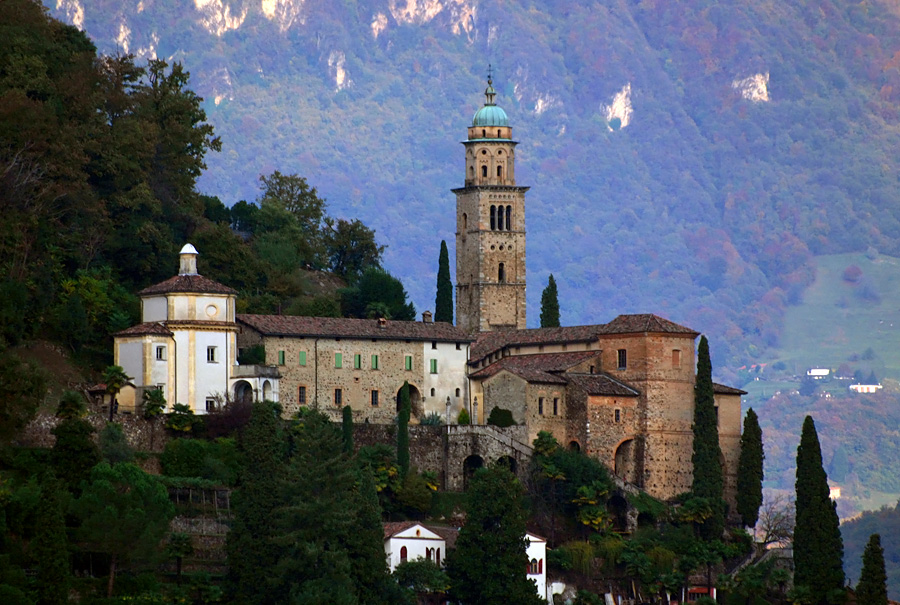
The parish church of Santa Maria del Sasso

The Chapel of S. Antonio Abate with its monumental staircase, the Parish Church of S. Maria del Sasso with Oratory, the Cimitero monumentale (Cemetery) and Scherrer Park are listed as Swiss heritage site of national significance. The entire village of Morcote is part of the Inventory of Swiss Heritage Sites.

=== Sites ===
The church of Santa Maria del Sasso was probably built in the 13th century. It was completely rebuilt in 1462 in the style of the Renaissance. In 1758 it was renovated in the Baroque style, while in the 18th century a monumental staircase was added to the front of the church. The church tower was built in the Middle Ages and made taller during the 16th century. The church contains several valuable frescos from the 16th and 17th centuries including one painting that is dated to 1513. The sacramental chapel contains carvings from 1591 and paintings from 1611. In the chapel on the opposite side contains an example of illusionistic architecture painting from the 18th century.

Near the church is the Chapel Sant'Antonio da Padova which was built in 1676 with an unusual octagonal floor plan and dome.

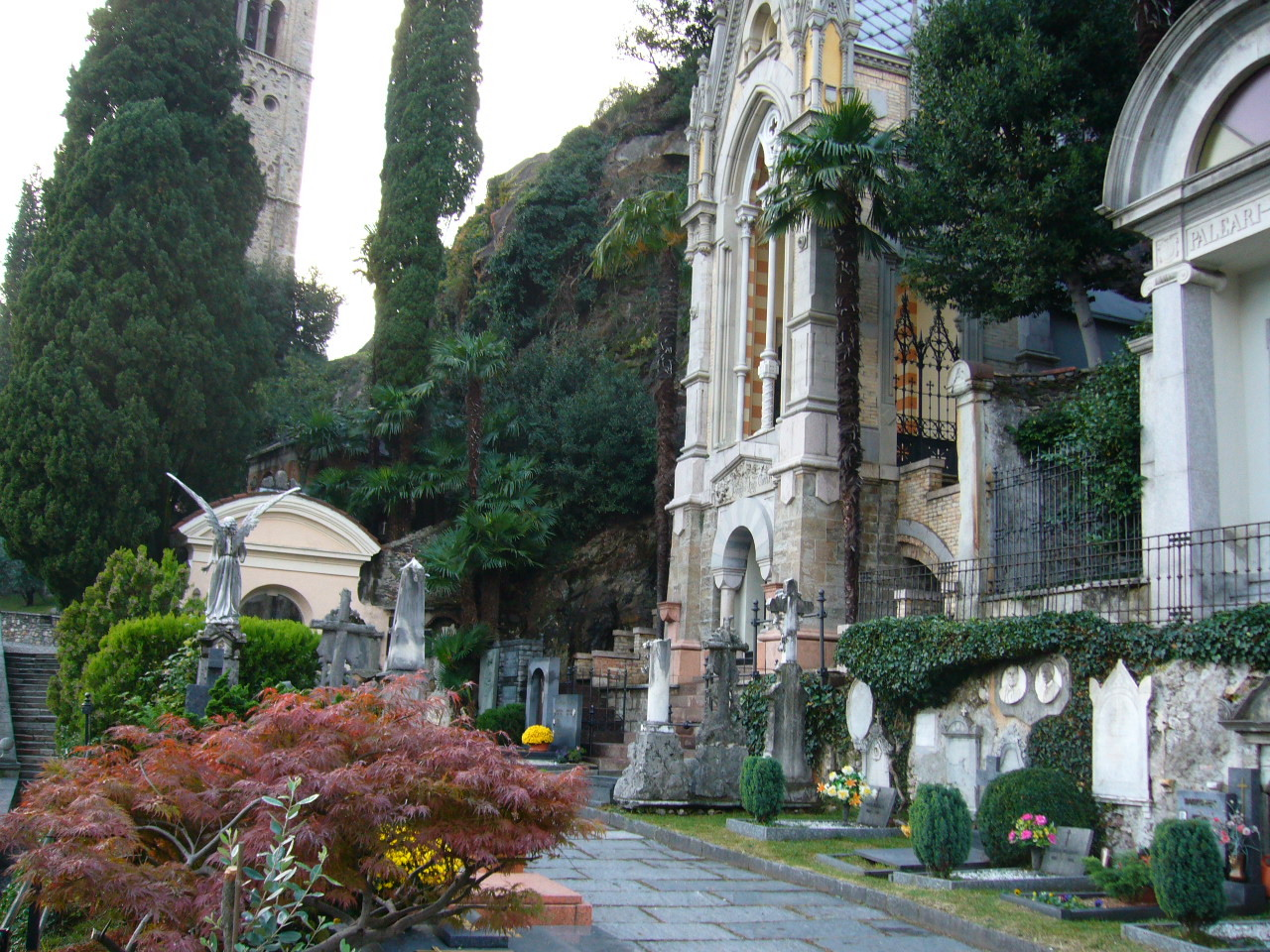
Cemetery of Morcote

In 1750, a large cemetery was added near the church. In the terraced cemetery overlooking the lake, many artists are buried, among them Alexander Moissi, actor, Georges Baklanoff, Russian baritone, Georg Kaiser, German author, and Eugen d’Albert, German composer and pianist.

The chapel of Sant'Antonio Abate, consecrated before 1591, was originally a hospice run by the Antonines order of Vienna. The interior houses several frescoes from a 15th-century master artist from Seregno, as well as other newer paintings.

The arcades along the lake shore date partly from the Late Middle Ages and include several noble houses from the 16th to 18th centuries. One of the most interesting is the Palazzo Paleari, which was built in 1483 and renovated in 1661.

In 1965, Scherrer Gardens, the former home of wealthy St. Gallen textile merchant, was opened to the public. The gardens are rich with luxurious subtropical vegetation and many kinds of buildings and art, both original and copies from all over the world. The gardens include palm trees, camellias, wisteria and oleanders, cedar and cypress trees, camphor and eucalyptus, magnolias and azaleas, orange and lemon trees, bamboo and many other kinds of fragrant plants.

== Demographics ==
Morcote has a population (as of December 2020) of 734. As of 2016, 42.3% of the population are resident foreign nationals. In 2015 a large minority (159 or 20.7% of the population) was born in Italy. Over the last 6 years (2010-2016) the population has changed at a rate of 4.57%. The birth rate in the municipality, in 2016, was 14.4, while the death rate was 9.2 per thousand residents.

Most of the population (as of 2000) speaks Italian (70.2%), with German being second most common (18.8%) and Serbo-Croatian being third (3.8%). Of the Swiss national languages (as of 2000), 142 speak German, 14 people speak French, 529 people speak Italian, and 2 people speak Romansh. The remainder (67 people) speak another language.

As of 2008, the gender distribution of the population was 47.5% male and 52.5% female. The population was made up of 229 Swiss men (30.7% of the population), and 125 (16.8%) non-Swiss men. There were 270 Swiss women (36.2%), and 122 (16.4%) non-Swiss women.

As of 2016, children and teenagers (0–19 years old) make up 12.6% of the population, while adults (20–64 years old) are 60.7% of the population and seniors (over 64 years old) make up 26.7%. The population of Morcote is older than average and has fewer children and teenagers. In 2015 there were 205 residents who were over 65 years old (26.7% vs 18% nationally). There were only 54 children under 10 and 43 teenagers under 20 (only 12.6% of the population under 20 vs 20.1% nationally). In 2015 there were 281 single residents, 373 people who were married or in a civil partnership, 50 widows or widowers and 65 divorced residents.

In 2016 there were 403 private households in Morcote with an average household size of 1.84 persons. In 2015 about 66.6% of all buildings in the municipality were single family homes, which is about the same as the percentage in the canton (68.1%) and greater than the percentage nationally (57.4%). Of the 394 inhabited buildings in the municipality, in 2000, about 71.6% were single family homes and 21.8% were multiple family buildings. Additionally, about 4.1% of the buildings were built before 1919, while 1.8% were built between 1991 and 2000. In 2015 the rate of construction of new housing units per 1000 residents was 10.4. The vacancy rate for the municipality, in 2017, was 1.54%.

The historical population is given in the following chart:

== Notable people ==
- Domenico Rossi (1657 in Morcote – 1737) a Swiss-Italian architect
- Davide Antonio Fossati (1708 in Morcote - 1795) a painter and etcher

== Politics ==
In the 2015 federal election the most popular party was the FDP with 49.3% of the vote. The next three most popular parties were the Ticino League (14.2%), the SVP (13.2%) and the SP (10.8%). In the federal election, a total of 245 votes were cast, and the voter turnout was 59.3%. The 2015 election saw a large change in the voting when compared to 2011., while the percentage that the SP dropped from 18.1% to 10.8%.

In the 2007 federal election the most popular party was the FDP which received 49.18% of the vote. The next three most popular parties were the SP (18.65%), the SVP (12.94%) and the Ticino League (7.36%). In the federal election, a total of 205 votes were cast, and the voter turnout was 46.0%.

In the 2007 Gran Consiglio election, there were a total of 446 registered voters in Morcote, of which 297 or 66.6% voted. 5 blank ballots and 1 null ballot were cast, leaving 291 valid ballots in the election. The most popular party was the PLRT which received 148 or 50.9% of the vote. The next three most popular parties were; the SSI (with 45 or 15.5%), the PS (with 44 or 15.1%) and the PPD+GenGiova (with 14 or 4.8%).

In the 2007 Consiglio di Stato election, 5 blank ballots and 1 null ballot were cast, leaving 291 valid ballots in the election. The most popular party was the PLRT which received 139 or 47.8% of the vote. The next three most popular parties were; the PS (with 56 or 19.2%), the SSI (with 38 or 13.1%) and the LEGA (with 35 or 12.0%).

== Economy ==
Morcote is classed as a high-income community. The municipality is part of the agglomeration of Lugano.

As of 2014, there were a total of 239 people employed in the municipality. There were no jobs or businesses in the primary economic sector in the municipality. The secondary sector employed 41 workers in seven separate businesses, of which one employed 30 of the workers. Finally, the tertiary sector provided 198 jobs in 69 businesses, of which one employed 73 workers.

In 2016 a total of 10.4% of the population received social assistance. In 2011 the unemployment rate in the municipality was 3.8%.

In 2015 local hotels had a total of 3,008 overnight stays, of which 32.8% were international visitors.

In 2015 the average cantonal, municipal and church tax rate in the municipality for a couple with two children making SFr 80,000 was 2.2% while the rate for a single person making SFr 150,000 was 14.9%. The canton has one of the lowest average tax rates for those making SFr 80,000 and an average rate for those making SFr 150,000. In 2013 the average income in the municipality per tax payer was SFr 87,232 and the per person average was SFr 63,419, which is greater than the cantonal averages of SFr 76,339 and SFr 33,527 respectively It is also greater than the national per tax payer average of SFr 82,682 and the per person average of SFr 35,825.

The municipality is a net importer of workers, with about 1.1 workers entering the municipality for every one leaving. About 24.5% of the workforce coming into Morcote are coming from outside Switzerland, while 0.9% of the locals commute out of Switzerland for work. Of the working population, 6.7% used public transportation to get to work, and 57.5% used a private car.

== Religion ==
From the 2000 census, 555 or 73.6% were Roman Catholic, while 87 or 11.5% belonged to the Swiss Reformed Church. There are 92 individuals (or about 12.20% of the population) who belong to another church (not listed on the census), and 20 individuals (or about 2.65% of the population) did not answer the question.

== Education ==
In Morcote about 74% of the population (between age 25–64) have completed either non-mandatory upper secondary education or additional higher education (either university or a Fachhochschule).

In Morcote there were a total of 69 students (as of 2009). The Ticino education system provides up to three years of non-mandatory kindergarten and in Morcote there were 6 children in kindergarten. The primary school program lasts for five years and includes both a standard school and a special school. In the municipality, 17 students attended the standard primary schools and 2 students attended the special school. In the lower secondary school system, students either attend a two-year middle school followed by a two-year pre-apprenticeship or they attend a four-year program to prepare for higher education. There were 16 students in the two-year middle school, while 9 students were in the four-year advanced program.

The upper secondary school includes several options, but at the end of the upper secondary program, a student will be prepared to enter a trade or to continue on to a university or college. In Ticino, vocational students may either attend school while working on their internship or apprenticeship (which takes three or four years) or may attend school followed by an internship or apprenticeship (which takes one year as a full-time student or one and a half to two years as a part-time student). There were 11 vocational students who were attending school full-time and 5 who attend part-time.

The professional program lasts three years and prepares a student for a job in engineering, nursing, computer science, business, tourism and similar fields. There were 3 students in the professional program.

As of 2000, there were 14 students in Morcote who came from another municipality, while 52 residents attended schools outside the municipality.
