= Brusimpiano =

- Comune
- Comune di Brusimpiano
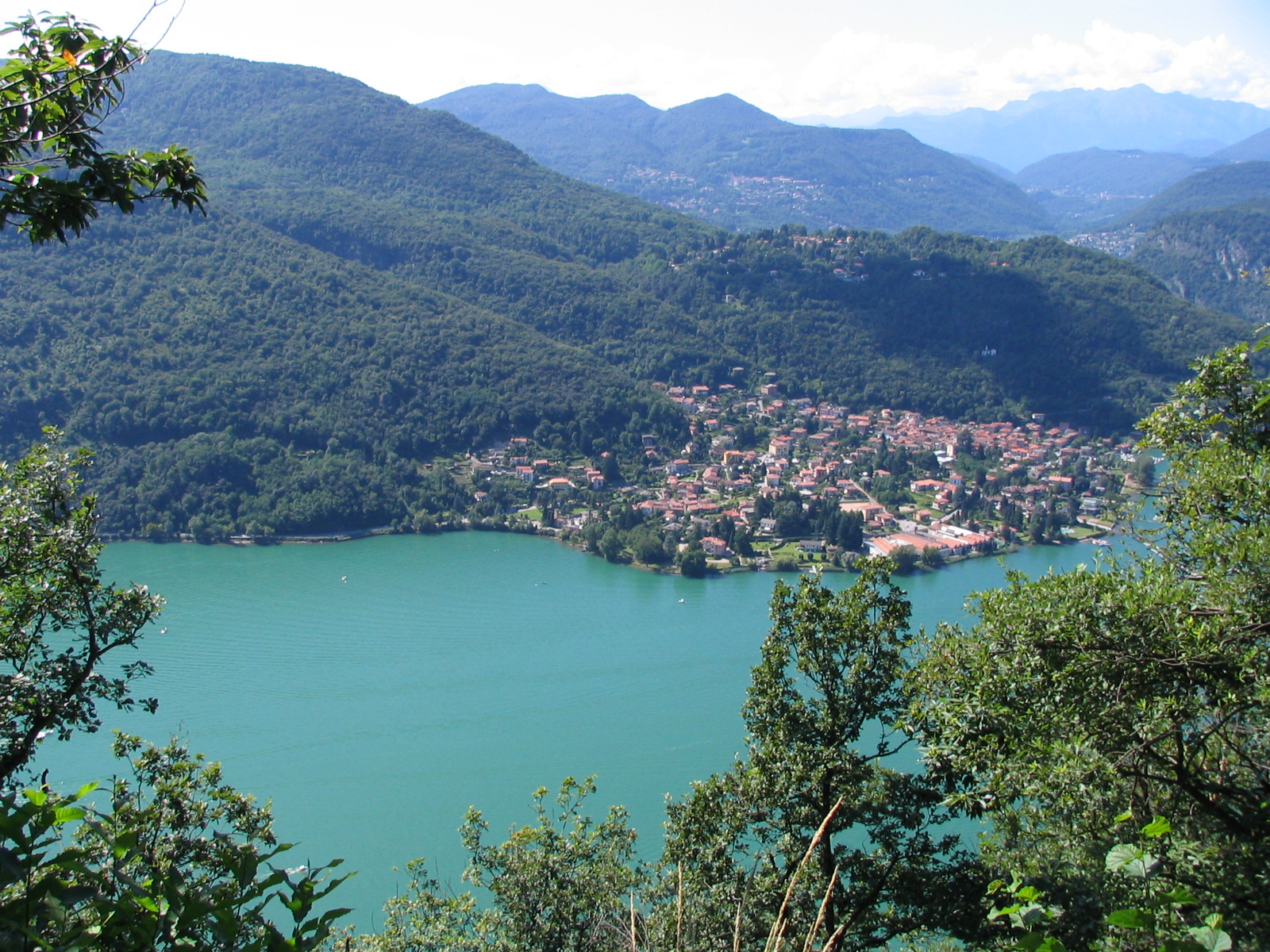

- Coat of arms

- Location within Italy Location within Lombardy
- Coordinates: 45°57′N 8°53′E
- Country: Italy
- Region: Lombardy
- Province: Varese (VA)

Government
  - Mayor: Fabio Zucconelli

Area
  - Total: 5.91 km^{2} (2.28 sq mi)
- Elevation: 289 m (948 ft)

Population (28 February 2017)
  - Total: 1,215
  - Density: 206/km^{2} (532/sq mi)
- Demonym: Brusimpianesi
- Time zone: UTC+1 (CET)
  - Summer (DST): UTC+2 (CEST)
- Postal code: 21050
- Dialing code: 0332
- Website: Official website

Brusimpiano is a comune (municipality) on Lake Lugano in the Province of Varese in the Italian region Lombardy, located about 60 kilometres (37 mi) northwest of Milan and about 15 kilometres (9 mi) north of Varese, on the border with Switzerland.

Brusimpiano borders the following municipalities: Barbengo (Switzerland), Caslano (Switzerland), Cuasso al Monte, Lavena Ponte Tresa, Marzio, Morcote (Switzerland), Porto Ceresio. The Comune is not far away from the Cinque Vette Park.

== Etymology ==
The name derives from the Greek bruxino ("narrow"), from which Bruxino a plano, or "narrow flat peninsula", a toponym of probable Byzantine origin was derived.
