= Brusino Arsizio =

- Municipality
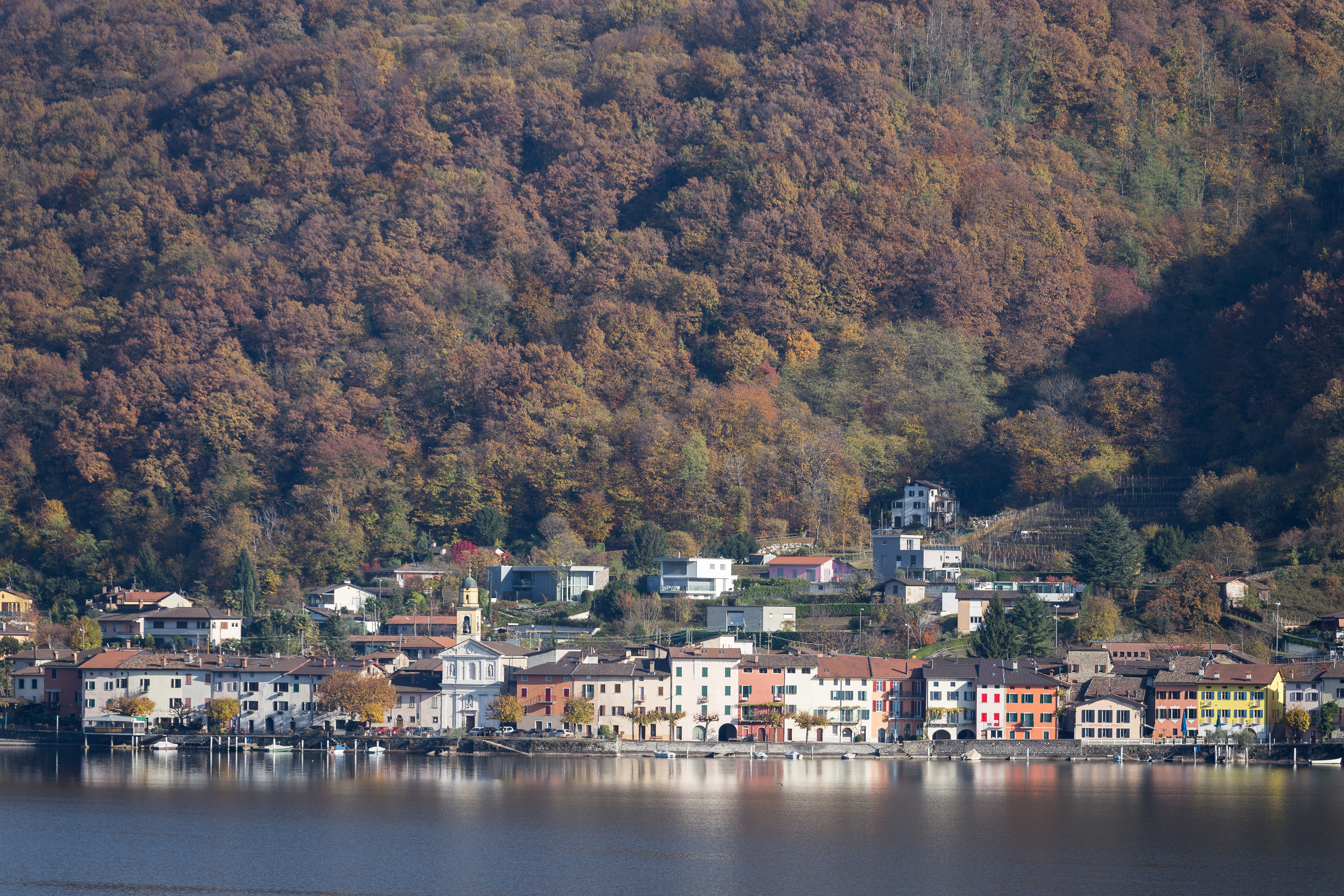
- Brusino Arsizio village

- Flag Coat of arms
- Location of Brusino Arsizio
- Location within Switzerland Location within Canton of Ticino
- Coordinates: 45°55′N 8°56′E
- Country: Switzerland
- Canton: Ticino
- District: Lugano

Government
  - Mayor: Sindaco

Area
  - Total: 4.04 km^{2} (1.56 sq mi)
- Elevation: 277 m (909 ft)

Population (December 2004)
  - Total: 481
  - Density: 119/km^{2} (308/sq mi)
- Time zone: UTC+01:00 (CET)
  - Summer (DST): UTC+02:00 (CEST)
- Postal code: 6827
- SFOS number: 5160
- ISO 3166 code: CH-TI
- Surrounded by: Bissone, Melide, Meride, Morcote, Porto Ceresio (IT-VA), Riva San Vitale, Vico Morcote
- Website: https://www.brusinoarsizio.ch SFSO statistics

Brusino Arsizio (Lombard: Brüsin Sciss) is a municipality in the district of Lugano in the canton of Ticino in Switzerland on the Lake of Lugano.

== History ==
The village has been inhabited since the Roman era. In 1970, a plundered Roman grave was found with grave goods. The modern municipality of Brusino Arsizio is first mentioned in 1167 as Bruxia.

In the 8th Century the Totoniden family of Campione d'Italia possessed land in the village. Around 1227, the monastery of S. Ambrogio in Milan acquired property. They built a tower or other fortification to help support the fortifications of Campione. In 1671 it was mentioned as Castrum Brugini Arsitii.

The parish church of San Michele, which was built during the era of the Lombard kings, broke away in 1508 from the mother church of Riva San Vitale.

Until the beginning of the 20th century, the activity of the population were linked with small cultivation, fishing and the cut of wood that was afterward brought to Lugano by boat and then sold at the local market. From the second half of the 19th century innovations were brought to Brusino. In 1875, the street that linked Brusino with Riva San Vitale was built, and then, in 1906 the street that linked Brusino with Porto Ceresio (Italy) was also finished.

In 1910 the drinking water was available in Brusino, and in 1914 also the electricity. From the post-war period, with the beginning of the mass tourism, hotel business started to become really important in this village (in 1958 the overnight stayings reached its climax with 33700 stayings). Nowadays Brusino is still a touristic village with almost 50% of the houses that are second-residence for tourist.

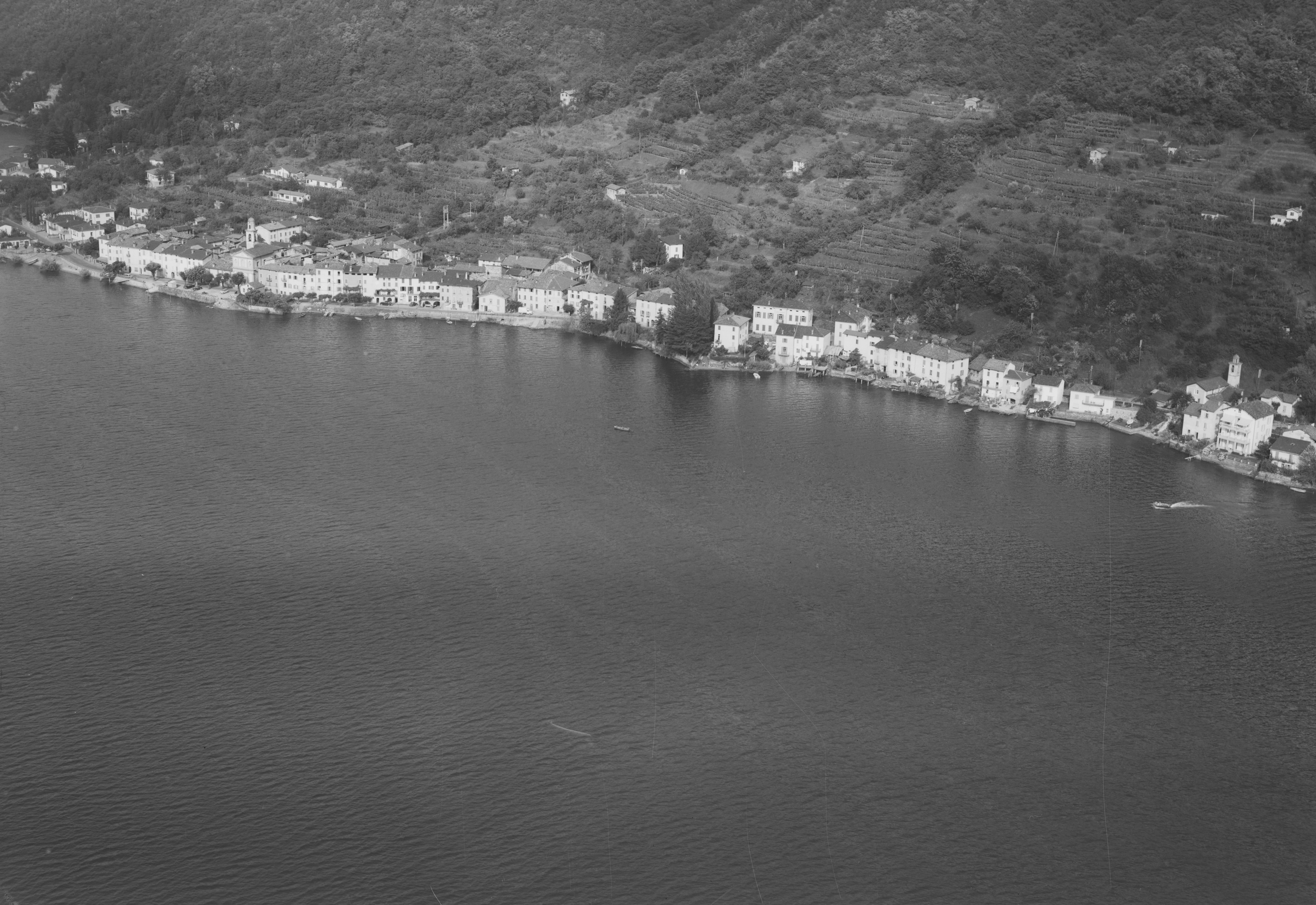
Aerial view (1964)

== Coat of arms ==
The municipal coat of arms is: Azure a tower argent flammant gules.

== Geography ==
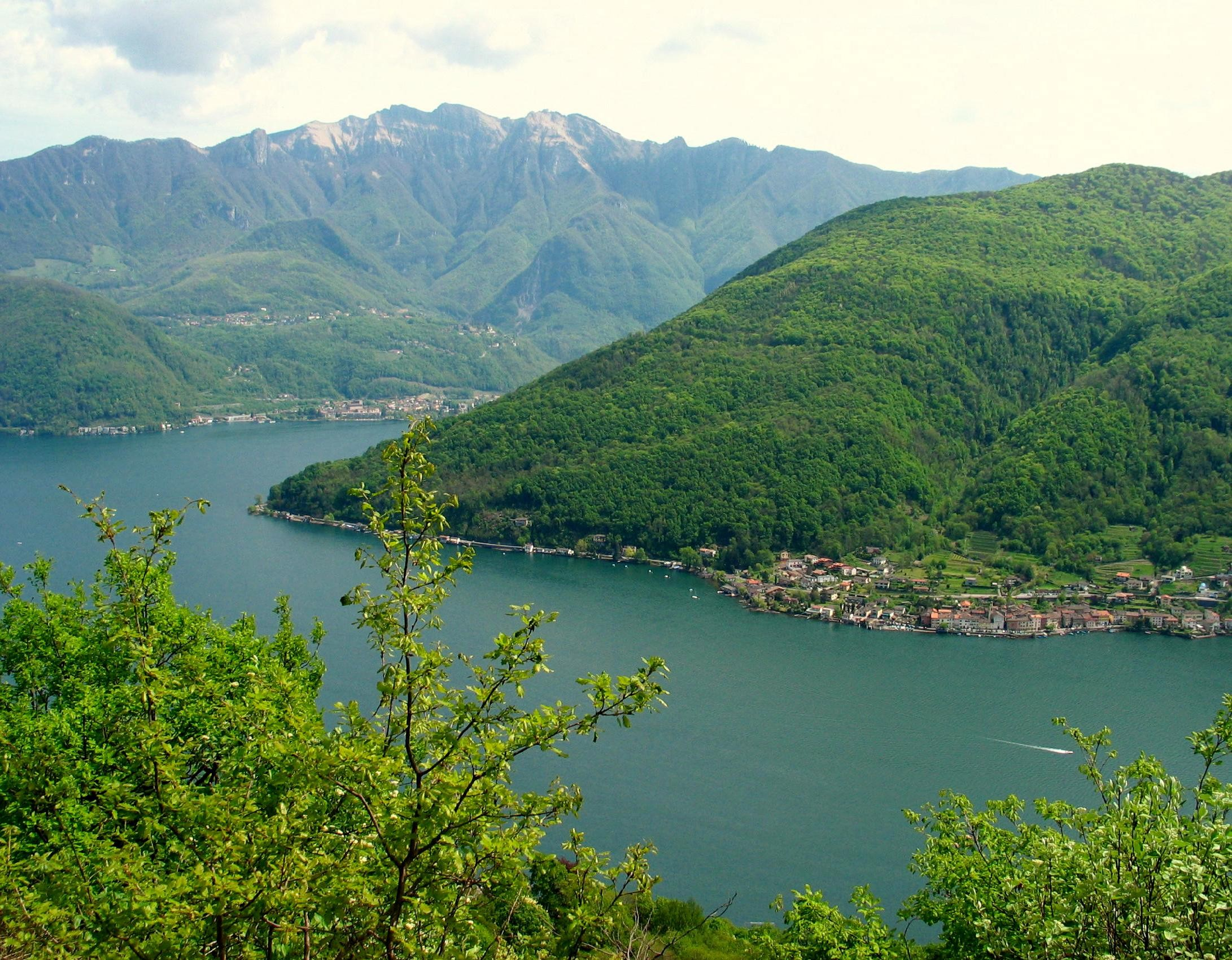
Lake Lugano seen from above Morcote. In the middle: the village of Brusino Arsizio and the Monte San Giorgio. In the background: Monte Generoso

Brusino Arsizio has an area, as of 1997, of 4.04 square kilometers (1.56 sq mi). Of this area, 0.29 km^{2} (0.11 sq mi) or 7.2% is used for agricultural purposes, while 3.62 km^{2} (1.40 sq mi) or 89.6% is forested. Of the rest of the land, 0.31 km^{2} (0.12 sq mi) or 7.7% is settled (buildings or roads), 0.04 km^{2} (9.9 acres) or 1.0% is either rivers or lakes and 0.01 km^{2} (2.5 acres) or 0.2% is unproductive land.

Of the built up area, housing and buildings made up 5.0% and transportation infrastructure made up 1.7%. Out of the forested land, all of the forested land area is covered with heavy forests. Of the agricultural land, 1.7% is used for growing crops and 5.0% is used for alpine pastures. Of the water in the municipality, 0.7% is in lakes and 0.2% is in rivers and streams.

The municipality is located in the Lugano district along the road from punta di Poiana (in Riva San Vitale) along Lake Lugano to the Italian border at Porto Ceresio. It consists of the village of Brusino Arsizio and the settlements of Finate and Serpiano.

== Demographics ==
Brusino Arsizio has a population (as of December 2020) of 451. As of 2008, 8.6% of the population are resident foreign nationals. Over the last 10 years (1997–2007) the population has changed at a rate of 4.1%.

Most of the population (as of 2000) speaks Italian (80.0%), with German being second most common (12.1%) and French being third (2.6%). Of the Swiss national languages (as of 2000), 55 speak German, 12 people speak French, 363 people speak Italian. The remainder (24 people) speak another language.

As of 2008, the gender distribution of the population was 50.0% male and 50.0% female. The population was made up of 209 Swiss men (44.1% of the population), and 28 (5.9%) non-Swiss men. There were 214 Swiss women (45.1%), and 23 (4.9%) non-Swiss women.

In 2008 there were 3 live births to Swiss citizens and were 3 deaths of Swiss citizens. Ignoring immigration and emigration, the population of Swiss citizens remained the same while the foreign population remained the same. There was 1 non-Swiss man who immigrated from another country to Switzerland and 2 non-Swiss women who emigrated from Switzerland to another country. The total Swiss population change in 2008 (from all sources, including moves across municipal borders) was an increase of 9 and the non-Swiss population change was a decrease of 11 people. This represents a population growth rate of −0.4%.

The age distribution, as of 2009, in Brusino Arsizio is; 36 children or 7.6% of the population are between 0 and 9 years old and 42 teenagers or 8.9% are between 10 and 19. Of the adult population, 43 people or 9.1% of the population are between 20 and 29 years old. 53 people or 11.2% are between 30 and 39, 81 people or 17.1% are between 40 and 49, and 88 people or 18.6% are between 50 and 59. The senior population distribution is 59 people or 12.4% of the population are between 60 and 69 years old, 39 people or 8.2% are between 70 and 79, there are 33 people or 7.0% who are over 80.

As of 2000, there were 205 private households in the municipality, and an average of 2.1 persons per household. In 2000 there were 215 single family homes (or 73.6% of the total) out of a total of 292 inhabited buildings. There were 48 two family buildings (16.4%) and 23 multi-family buildings (7.9%). There were also 6 buildings in the municipality that were multipurpose buildings (used for both housing and commercial or another purpose).

The vacancy rate for the municipality, in 2008, was 0%. In 2000 there were 425 apartments in the municipality. The most common apartment size was the 4 room apartment of which there were 121. There were 30 single room apartments and 94 apartments with five or more rooms. Of these apartments, a total of 202 apartments (47.5% of the total) were permanently occupied, while 221 apartments (52.0%) were seasonally occupied and 2 apartments (0.5%) were empty. As of 2007, the construction rate of new housing units was 2.2 new units per 1000 residents.

The historical population is given in the following table:

| year | population |
|---|---|
| 1591 | c. 130 |
| 1635 | 89 |
| 1670 | 157 |
| 1850 | 291 |
| 1900 | 321 |
| 1950 | 326 |
| 2000 | 454 |

== Sights ==
The entire village of Brusino Arsizio is designated as part of the Inventory of Swiss Heritage Sites.

== Politics ==
In the 2007 federal election the most popular party was the FDP which received 27.45% of the vote. The next three most popular parties were the CVP (21.86%), the SP (21.01%) and the Ticino League (12.35%). In the federal election, a total of 165 votes were cast, and the voter turnout was 48.2%.

In the 2007 Gran Consiglio election, there were a total of 356 registered voters in Brusino Arsizio, of which 237 or 66.6% voted. 2 blank ballots were cast, leaving 235 valid ballots in the election. The most popular party was the PPD+GenGiova which received 55 or 23.4% of the vote. The next three most popular parties were; the PS (with 52 or 22.1%), the PLRT (with 42 or 17.9%) and the SSI (with 34 or 14.5%).

In the 2007 Consiglio di Stato election, 4 blank ballots were cast, leaving 233 valid ballots in the election. The most popular party was the PS which received 58 or 24.9% of the vote. The next three most popular parties were; the PPD (with 49 or 21.0%), the PLRT (with 45 or 19.3%) and the LEGA (with 37 or 15.9%).

== Economy ==
As of 2007, Brusino Arsizio had an unemployment rate of 3.44%. As of 2005, there were 9 people employed in the primary economic sector and about 1 business involved in this sector. 5 people were employed in the secondary sector and there were 2 businesses in this sector. 126 people were employed in the tertiary sector, with 23 businesses in this sector. There were 207 residents of the municipality who were employed in some capacity, of which females made up 40.6% of the workforce.

In 2000, there were 126 workers who commuted into the municipality and 148 workers who commuted away. The municipality is a net exporter of workers, with about 1.2 workers leaving the municipality for every one entering. About 40.5% of the workforce coming into Brusino Arsizio are coming from outside Switzerland. Of the working population, 5.3% used public transportation to get to work, and 72.5% used a private car.

As of 2009, there were 3 hotels in Brusino Arsizio with a total of 119 rooms and 175 beds.

== Religion ==
From the 2000 census, 361 or 79.5% were Roman Catholic, while 40 or 8.8% belonged to the Swiss Reformed Church. There are 41 individuals (or about 9.03% of the population) who belong to another church (not listed on the census), and 12 individuals (or about 2.64% of the population) did not answer the question.

== Education ==
The entire Swiss population is generally well educated. In Brusino Arsizio about 78.2% of the population (between age 25–64) have completed either non-mandatory upper secondary education or additional higher education (either university or a Fachhochschule).

In Brusino Arsizio there were a total of 54 students (as of 2009). The Ticino education system provides up to three years of non-mandatory kindergarten and in Brusino Arsizio there were 5 children in kindergarten. The primary school program lasts for five years. In the municipality, 12 students attended the standard primary schools. In the lower secondary school system, students either attend a two-year middle school followed by a two-year pre-apprenticeship or they attend a four-year program to prepare for higher education. There were 14 students in the two-year middle school, while 9 students were in the four-year advanced program.

The upper secondary school includes several options, but at the end of the upper secondary program, a student will be prepared to enter a trade or to continue on to a university or college. In Ticino, vocational students may either attend school while working on their internship or apprenticeship (which takes three or four years) or may attend school followed by an internship or apprenticeship (which takes one year as a full-time student or one and a half to two years as a part-time student). There were 7 vocational students who were attending school full-time and 4 who attend part-time.

The professional program lasts three years and prepares a student for a job in engineering, nursing, computer science, business, tourism and similar fields. There were 3 students in the professional program.

As of 2000, there were 49 students from Brusino Arsizio who attended schools outside the municipality.
