= Bisuschio =

- Comune
- Comune di Bisuschio
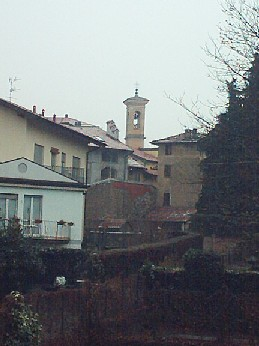
- View of Bisuschio

- Location within Italy Location within Lombardy
- Coordinates: 45°52′N 08°52′E
- Country: Italy
- Region: Lombardy
- Province: Varese (VA)
- Frazioni: Ponte, Molino del Frec, Centro, Zerbi, Molino dei Prati, Roncaccio, Piamo, Pogliana, Ravasina, Rossaga

Government
  - Mayor: Giovanni Resteghini (since 27 May 2019)

Area
  - Total: 7.03 km^{2} (2.71 sq mi)
- Elevation: 370 m (1,210 ft)

Population (2024)
  - Total: 4,276
  - Density: 608/km^{2} (1,580/sq mi)
- Demonym: Bisuschiesi
- Time zone: UTC+1 (CET)
  - Summer (DST): UTC+2 (CEST)
- Postal code: 21050
- Dialing code: 0332
- Patron saint: San Giorgio

Bisuschio is a town and comune located in the province of Varese, in the Lombardy region of northern Italy. The frazione of the city are Ponte, Ravasina, Molino del Frec, Centro, Zerbi, Piamo, Molino dei Prati, Rossaga, Roncaccio, and Pogliana.
