= Daverio =

- Comune
- Comune di Daverio
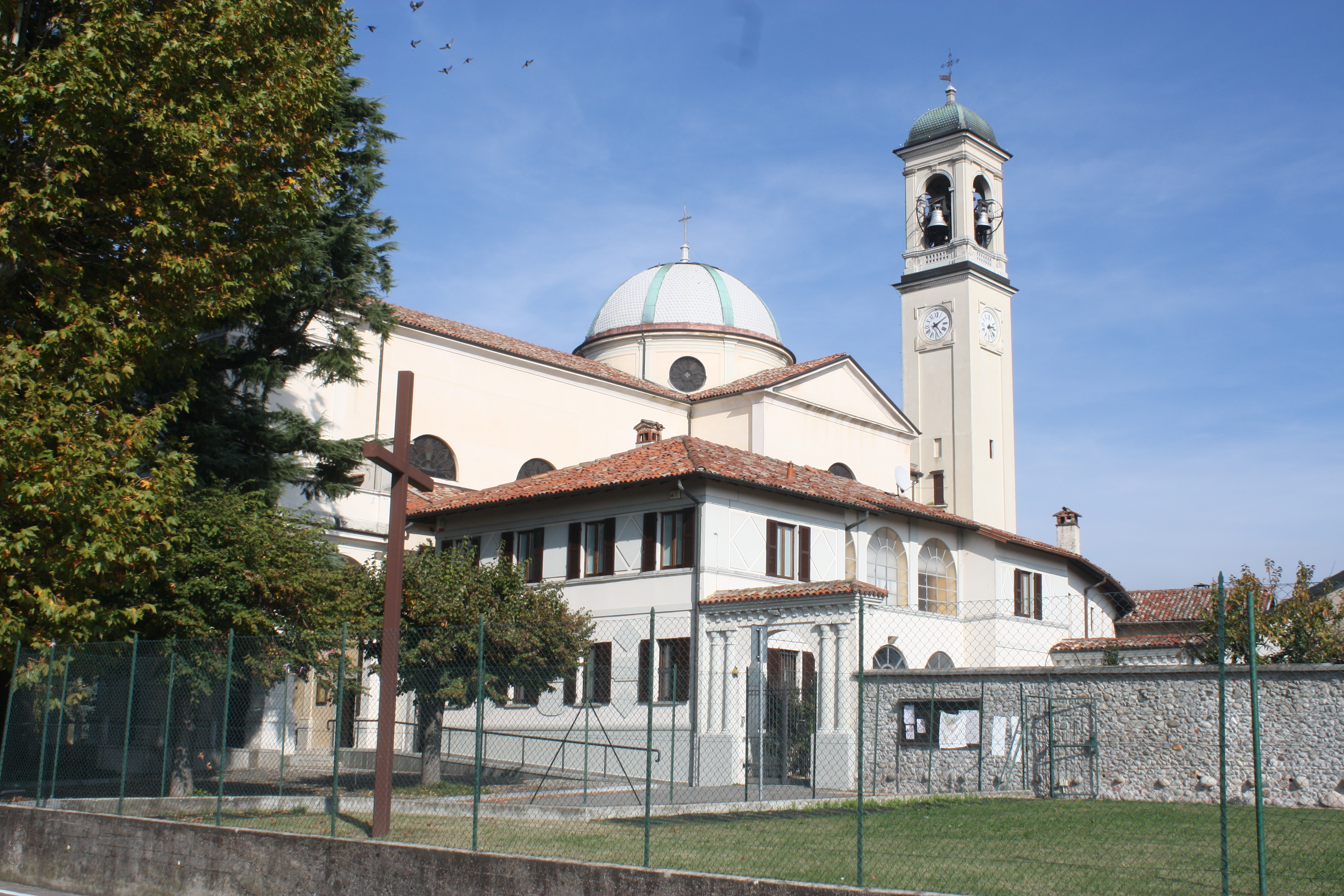

- Location within Italy Location within Lombardy
- Coordinates: 45°47′N 8°46′E
- Country: Italy
- Region: Lombardy
- Province: Province of Varese (VA)

Government
  - Mayor: Marco Colombo

Area
  - Total: 4.0 km^{2} (1.5 sq mi)

Population (Dec. 2004)
  - Total: 2,751
  - Density: 690/km^{2} (1,800/sq mi)
- Time zone: UTC+1 (CET)
  - Summer (DST): UTC+2 (CEST)
- Postal code: 21020
- Dialing code: 0332

Daverio is a comune (municipality) in the Province of Varese in the Italian region Lombardy, located about 45 kilometres (28 mi) northwest of Milan and about 6 kilometres (4 mi) southwest of Varese. As of 31 December 2004, it had a population of 2,751 and an area of 4.0 square kilometres (1.5 mi^{2}).

Daverio borders the following municipalities: Azzate, Bodio Lomnago, Casale Litta, Crosio della Valle, Galliate Lombardo.

== Population history ==
Historical population

Year	Pop.	±%
1861	926	—
1871	1,004	+8.4%
1881	1,066	+6.2%
1901	1,124	+5.4%
1911	1,013	−9.9%

Year	Pop.	±%
1921	1,052	+3.8%
1931	1,008	−4.2%
1936	969	−3.9%
1951	1,031	+6.4%
1961	1,242	+20.5%

Year	Pop.	±%
1971	1,739	+40.0%
1981	1,912	+9.9%
1991	2,060	+7.7%
2001	2,634	+27.9%

Source: Data from ISTAT
