= Inarzo =

- Comune
- Comune di Inarzo
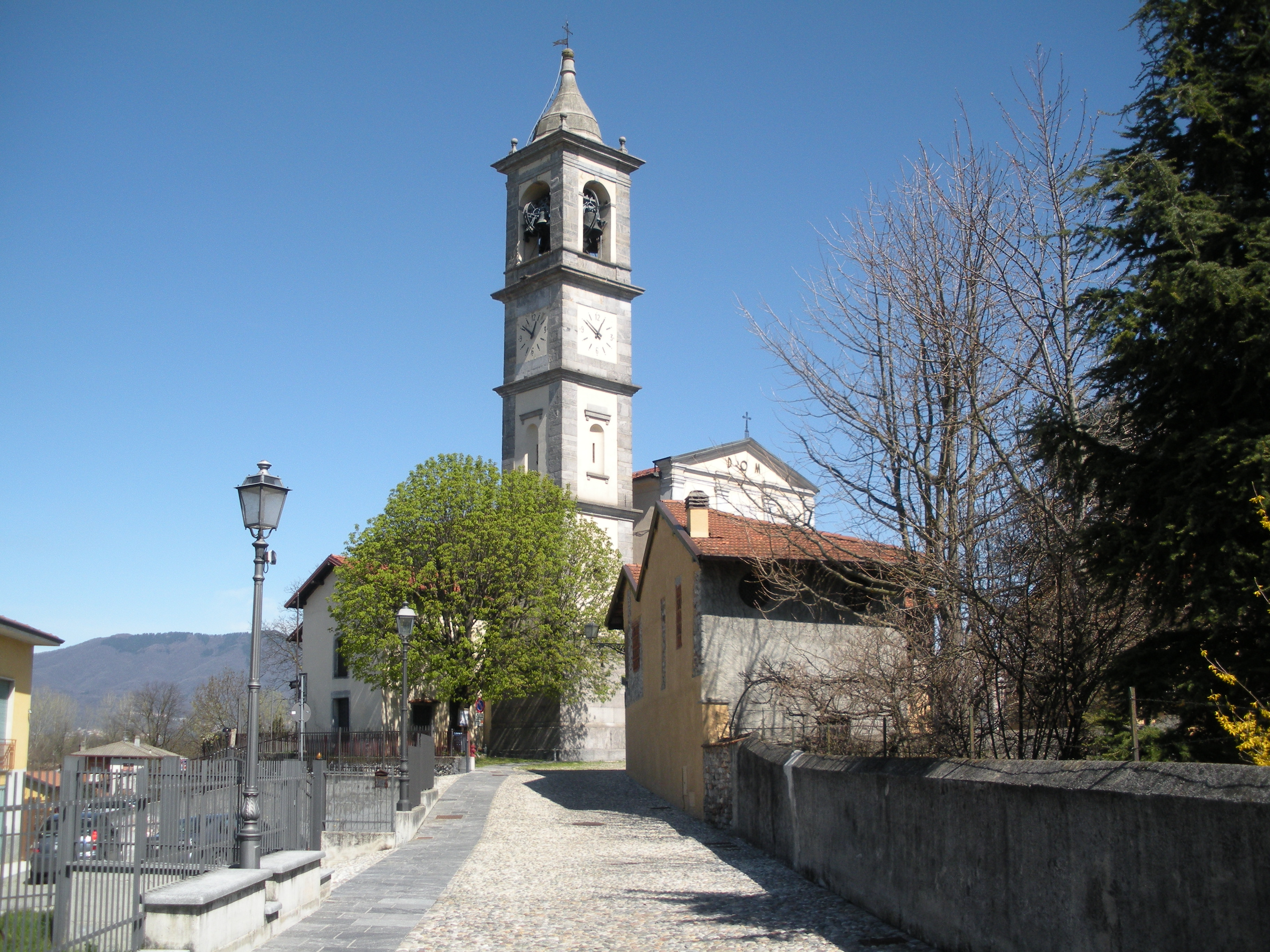

- Location within Italy Location within Lombardy
- Coordinates: 45°47′N 8°44′E
- Country: Italy
- Region: Lombardy
- Province: Province of Varese (VA)

Area
  - Total: 2.4 km^{2} (0.93 sq mi)
- Elevation: 283 m (928 ft)

Population (Dec. 2004)
  - Total: 856
  - Density: 360/km^{2} (920/sq mi)
- Demonym: Inarzesi
- Time zone: UTC+1 (CET)
  - Summer (DST): UTC+2 (CEST)
- Postal code: 21020
- Dialing code: 0332
- Website: Official website

Inarzo is a comune (municipality) in the Province of Varese in the Italian region Lombardy, located about 50 kilometres (31 mi) northwest of Milan and about 8 kilometres (5 mi) southwest of Varese. As of 2011 it had a population of 1073 and an area of 2.4 square kilometres (0.93 mi^{2}).

Inarzo borders the following municipalities: Bodio Lomnago, Cazzago Brabbia, Casale Litta, Varano Borghi, Ternate, Biandronno.

== Population history ==
Historical population

| Year | Pop. | ±% |
|---|---|---|
| 1861 | 490 | — |
| 1871 | 583 | +19.0% |
| 1881 | 630 | +8.1% |
| 1901 | 705 | +11.9% |
| 1911 | 647 | −8.2% |

| Year | Pop. | ±% |
|---|---|---|
| 1921 | 606 | −6.3% |
| 1931 | 497 | −18.0% |
| 1936 | 461 | −7.2% |
| 1951 | 513 | +11.3% |
| 1961 | 601 | +17.2% |

| Year | Pop. | ±% |
|---|---|---|
| 1971 | 564 | −6.2% |
| 1981 | 659 | +16.8% |
| 1991 | 677 | +2.7% |
| 2001 | 805 | +18.9% |

Source: Data from ISTAT
