= Galliate Lombardo =

- Comune
- Comune di Galliate Lombardo
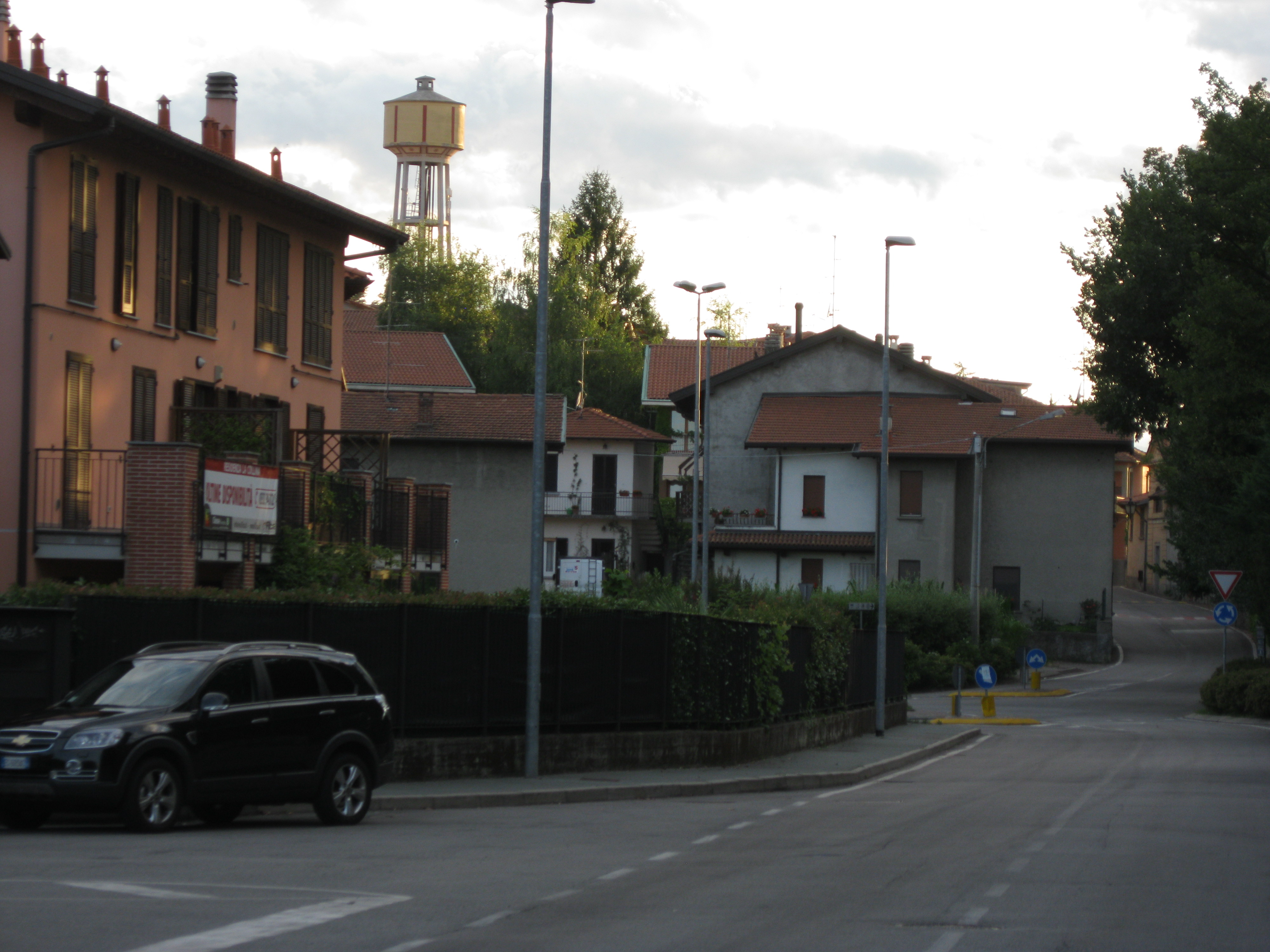

- Location within Italy Location within Lombardy
- Coordinates: 45°47′N 8°46′E
- Country: Italy
- Region: Lombardy
- Province: Province of Varese (VA)

Area
  - Total: 3.7 km^{2} (1.4 sq mi)
- Elevation: 336 m (1,102 ft)

Population (Dec. 2004)
  - Total: 841
  - Density: 230/km^{2} (590/sq mi)
- Demonym: Galliatesi
- Time zone: UTC+1 (CET)
  - Summer (DST): UTC+2 (CEST)
- Postal code: 21020
- Dialing code: 0332
- Website: Official website

Galliate Lombardo is a comune (municipality) in the Province of Varese in the Italian region Lombardy, located about 45 kilometres (28 mi) northwest of Milan and about 6 kilometres (4 mi) southwest of Varese. As of 31 December 2004, it had a population of 841 and an area of 3.7 square kilometres (1.4 mi^{2}).

Galliate Lombardo borders the following municipalities: Azzate, Bodio Lomnago, Daverio, Varese.

== Demographic evolution ==
Historical population

Year	Pop.	±%
1861	428	—
1871	473	+10.5%
1881	532	+12.5%
1901	509	−4.3%
1911	456	−10.4%

Year	Pop.	±%
1921	452	−0.9%
1931	429	−5.1%
1936	437	+1.9%
1951	431	−1.4%
1961	429	−0.5%

Year	Pop.	±%
1971	445	+3.7%
1981	544	+22.2%
1991	753	+38.4%
2001	844	+12.1%

Source: Data from ISTAT
