= Crosio della Valle =

- Comune
- Comune di Crosio della Valle
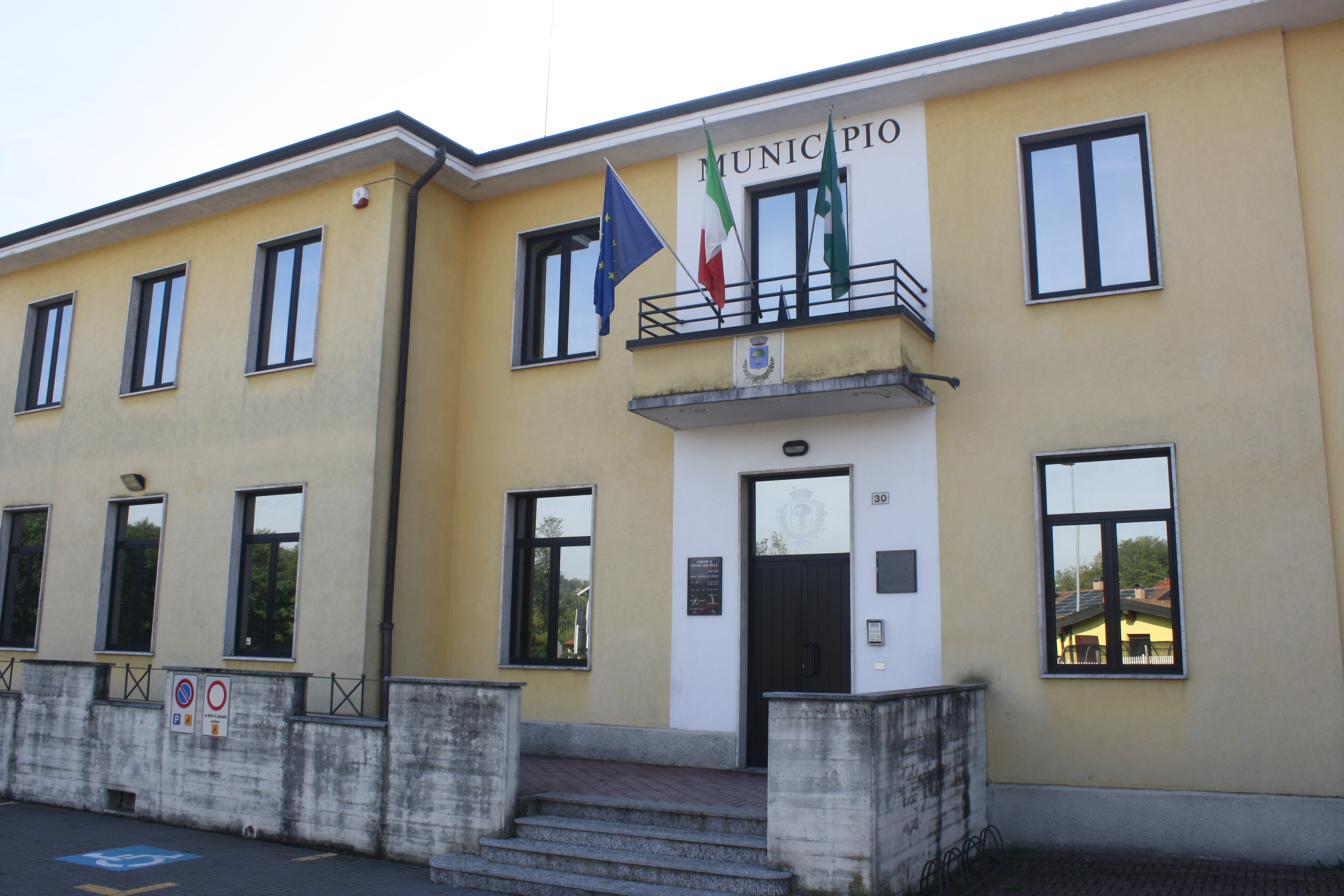

- Location within Italy Location within Lombardy
- Coordinates: 45°47′N 8°48′E
- Country: Italy
- Region: Lombardy
- Province: Province of Varese (VA)

Area
  - Total: 1.5 km^{2} (0.58 sq mi)

Population (Dec. 2004)
  - Total: 604
  - Density: 400/km^{2} (1,000/sq mi)
- Demonym: Crosiani
- Time zone: UTC+1 (CET)
  - Summer (DST): UTC+2 (CEST)
- Postal code: 21020
- Dialing code: 0332

Crosio della Valle is a comune (municipality) in the Province of Varese in the Italian region Lombardy, located about 45 kilometres (28 mi) northwest of Milan and about 5 kilometres (3 mi) southwest of Varese. As of 31 December 2004, it had a population of 604 and an area of 1.5 square kilometres (0.58 mi^{2}).

Crosio della Valle borders the following municipalities: Azzate, Casale Litta, Daverio, Mornago, Sumirago.

== Demographic evolution ==
Historical population

| Year | Pop. | ±% |
|---|---|---|
| 1861 | 250 | — |
| 1871 | 308 | +23.2% |
| 1881 | 345 | +12.0% |
| 1901 | 324 | −6.1% |
| 1911 | 328 | +1.2% |

| Year | Pop. | ±% |
|---|---|---|
| 1921 | 336 | +2.4% |
| 1931 | 303 | −9.8% |
| 1936 | 276 | −8.9% |
| 1951 | 296 | +7.2% |
| 1961 | 341 | +15.2% |

| Year | Pop. | ±% |
|---|---|---|
| 1971 | 463 | +35.8% |
| 1981 | 460 | −0.6% |
| 1991 | 476 | +3.5% |
| 2001 | 572 | +20.2% |

Source: Data from ISTAT
