= Casale Litta =

- Comune
- Comune di Casale Litta
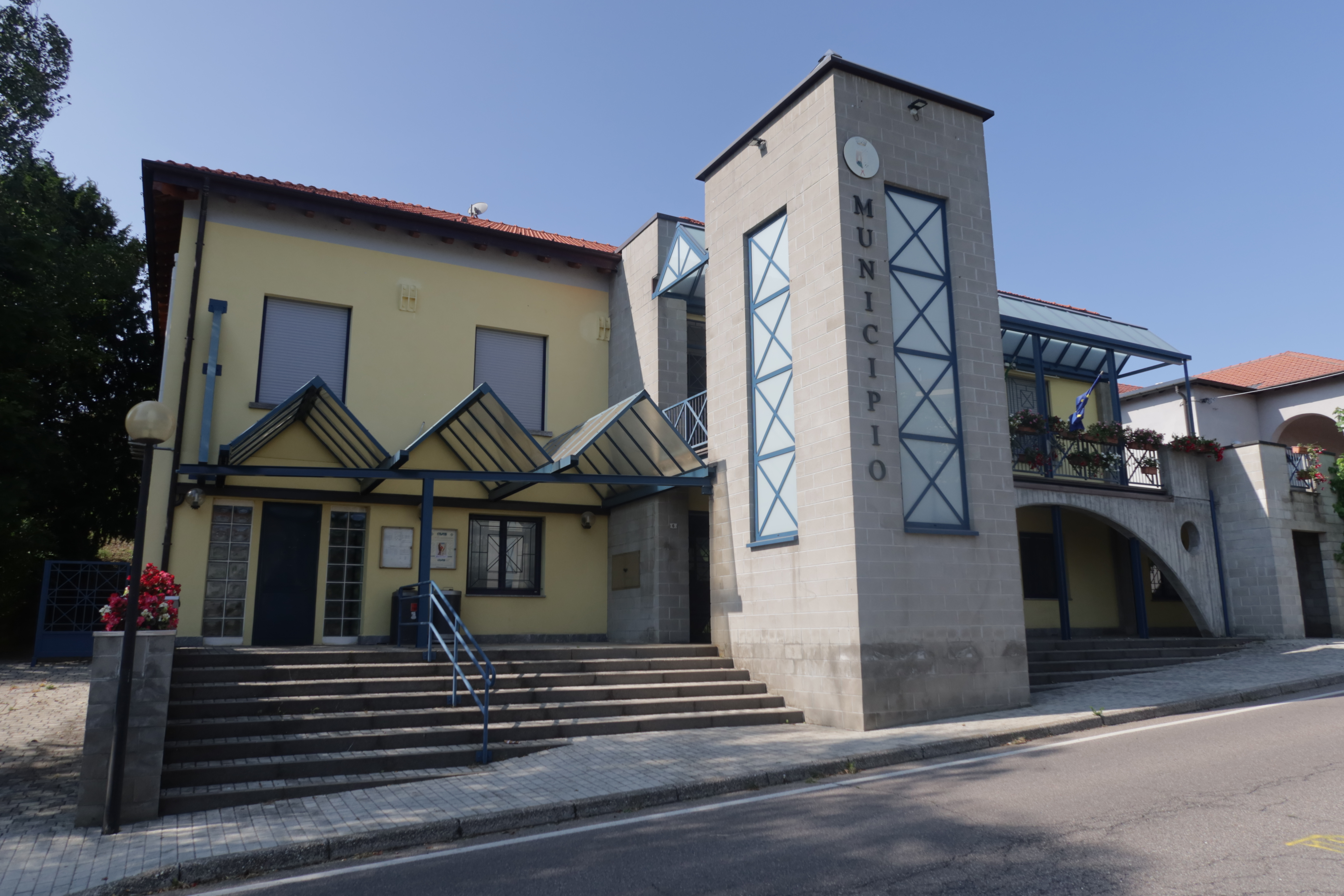

- Coat of arms

- Location within Italy Location within Lombardy
- Coordinates: 45°46′N 8°44′E
- Country: Italy
- Region: Lombardy
- Province: Varese (VA)
- Frazioni: Villadosia, San Pancrazio, Bernate, Gaggio

Government
  - Mayor: Graziano Maffioli

Area
  - Total: 10.7 km^{2} (4.1 sq mi)
- Elevation: 382 m (1,253 ft)

Population (2007)
  - Total: 2,413
  - Density: 226/km^{2} (584/sq mi)
- Time zone: UTC+1 (CET)
  - Summer (DST): UTC+2 (CEST)
- Postal code: 21020
- Dialing code: 0332
- Patron saint: St. Blaise
- Saint day: February 3
- Website: Official website

Casale Litta is a comune (municipality) in the Province of Varese in the Italian region Lombardy, located about 45 kilometres (28 mi) northwest of Milan and about 10 kilometres (6 mi) southwest of Varese.

Casale Litta borders the following municipalities: Bodio Lomnago, Crosio della Valle, Daverio, Inarzo, Mornago, Varano Borghi, Vergiate.

== Demographic evolution ==
Historical population

Year	Pop.	±%
1861	1,492	—
1871	1,775	+19.0%
1881	1,918	+8.1%
1901	2,044	+6.6%
1911	1,934	−5.4%

Year	Pop.	±%
1921	1,629	−15.8%
1931	1,682	+3.3%
1936	1,636	−2.7%
1951	1,762	+7.7%
1961	1,953	+10.8%

Year	Pop.	±%
1971	1,993	+2.0%
1981	2,104	+5.6%
1991	2,235	+6.2%
2001	2,420	+8.3%

Source: Data from ISTAT
