= Terrenate =

Terrenate may refer to:

- Terrenate, Sonora, see Area codes in Mexico by code (600–699)
- Terrenate, Tlaxcala, Mexico

== See also ==
- Ternate (disambiguation)
