= Varano Borghi =

- Comune
- Comune di Varano Borghi
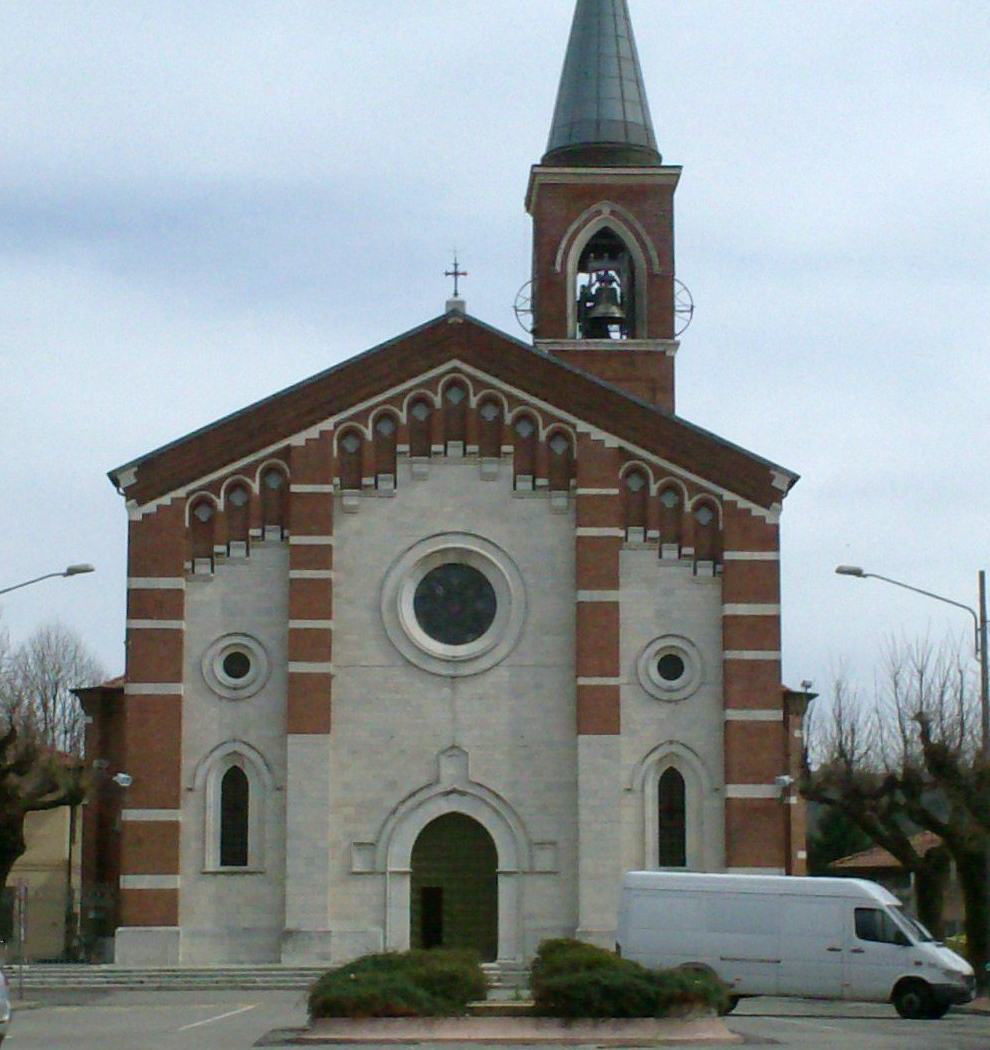

- Location within Italy Location within Lombardy
- Coordinates: 45°46′N 8°42′E
- Country: Italy
- Region: Lombardy
- Province: Province of Varese (VA)

Area
  - Total: 3.3 km^{2} (1.3 sq mi)

Population (Dec. 2004)
  - Total: 2,242
  - Density: 680/km^{2} (1,800/sq mi)
- Time zone: UTC+1 (CET)
  - Summer (DST): UTC+2 (CEST)
- Postal code: 21020
- Dialing code: 0332

Varano Borghi is a comune (municipality) in the Province of Varese in the Italian region Lombardy, located about 50 kilometres (31 mi) northwest of Milan and about 12 kilometres (7.5 mi) southwest of Varese. As of 31 December 2004, it had a population of 2,242 and an area of 3.3 square kilometres (1.3 mi^{2}).

Varano Borghi borders the following municipalities: Casale Litta, Comabbio, Inarzo, Mercallo, Ternate, Vergiate.

== Demographic evolution ==
Historical population

Year	Pop.	±%
1861	500	—
1871	668	+33.6%
1881	843	+26.2%
1901	1,116	+32.4%
1911	1,097	−1.7%

Year	Pop.	±%
1921	1,031	−6.0%
1931	1,242	+20.5%
1936	1,246	+0.3%
1951	1,613	+29.5%
1961	2,011	+24.7%

Year	Pop.	±%
1971	2,530	+25.8%
1981	2,460	−2.8%
1991	2,330	−5.3%
2001	2,194	−5.8%

Source: Data from ISTAT
