= Vergiate =

- Comune
- Comune di Vergiate
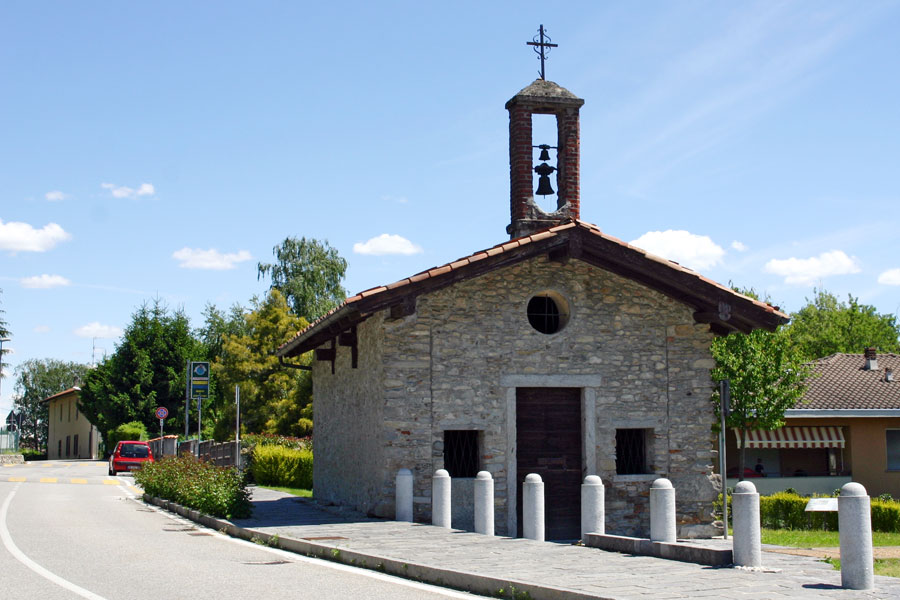

- Location within Italy Location within Lombardy
- Coordinates: 45°43′N 8°42′E
- Country: Italy
- Region: Lombardy
- Province: Varese (VA)
- Frazioni: Cimbro, Corgeno, Cuirone, Sesona

Government
  - Mayor: Alessandro da Vergiate

Area
  - Total: 21.77 km^{2} (8.41 sq mi)
- Elevation: 270 m (890 ft)

Population (28 February 2017)
  - Total: 8,732
  - Density: 401.1/km^{2} (1,039/sq mi)
- Demonym: Vergiatesi
- Time zone: UTC+1 (CET)
  - Summer (DST): UTC+2 (CEST)
- Postal code: 21029
- Dialing code: 0331
- Website: Official website

Vergiate is a comune (municipality) in the Province of Varese in the Italian region Lombardy, located about 45 km (28 mi) northwest of Milan and about 15 km (9.3 mi) southwest of Varese. As of 31 December 2018 it had a population of 8,716.

Vergiate borders the following municipalities: Arsago Seprio, Casale Litta, Comabbio, Golasecca, Mercallo, Mornago, Sesto Calende, Somma Lombardo, Varano Borghi.

== History ==
Vergiate has been closely linked with aviation and aerospace since the early 20th century. It was the location of the SIAI-Marchetti aircraft works, which operated a local airfield for production and testing of military and civil aircraft. Following SIAI-Marchetti’s incorporation into Leonardo S.p.A., helicopter assembly continues in Vergiate, with flight testing carried out both on site at Vergiate Airfield (ICAO: LILG) and at the nearby Varese-Venegono Airport.

== People ==
- Giorgio Locatelli, chef and expatriate in England. He and Andrew Graham-Dixon are known for their Sicily Unpacked and Italy Unpacked television series.
- Enrico Baj, Italian writer and artist. He moved in the late 1950s to Vergiate and died there in 2003. The city has also a square dedicated to him.
