= Mornago =

- Comune
- Comune di Mornago
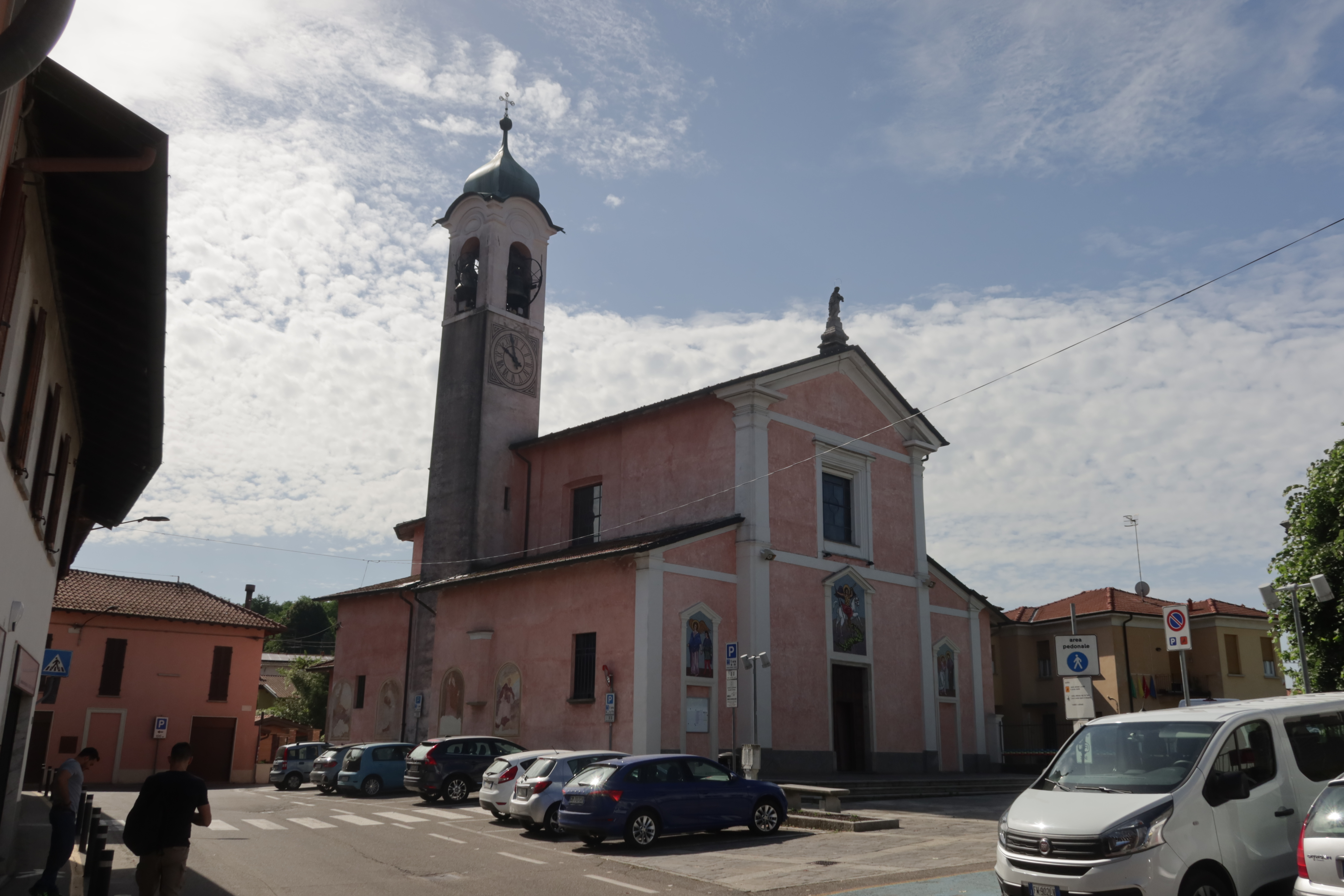
- The Church of San Michele Arcangelo

- Location within Italy Location within Lombardy
- Country: Italy
- Region: Lombardy
- Province: Province of Varese (VA)
- Frazioni: Crugnola, Montonate, Vinago

Government
  - Mayor: Davide Tamborini (LISTA CIVICA: VIVIAMO MORNAGO)

Area
  - Total: 12 km^{2} (4.6 sq mi)

Population (Dec. 2019)395,07 ab./km²
  - Total: 5,011
  - Density: 420/km^{2} (1,100/sq mi)
- Demonym: Mornaghesi
- Time zone: UTC+1 (CET)
  - Summer (DST): UTC+2 (CEST)
- Postal code: 21020
- Dialing code: 0331
- ISTAT code: 012106
- Patron saint: San Michele Arcangelo
- Saint day: 29 September
- Website: Official website https://www.amministrazionicomunali.it/lombardia/mornago

Mornago is a comune (municipality) in the Province of Varese, in the Italian region of Lombardy. It is about 45 km (28 mi) northwest of Milan and about 10 km (6.2 mi) southwest of Varese. It has a population of 5011 inhabitants and an area of 12 km^{2} (4.6 sq mi).

Mornago contains the frazione (subdivision) of Crugnola, Montonate and Vinago, and borders the municipalities of Arsago Seprio, Besnate, Casale Litta, Crosio della Valle, Sumirago and Vergiate.

== Public Holiday ==
29 September of every year

== Saint patron ==
San michele arcangelo

== Demographic evolution ==
Historical population

Year	Pop.	±%
1861	1,665	—
1871	1,871	+12.4%
1881	1,913	+2.2%
1901	2,040	+6.6%
1911	2,018	−1.1%

Year	Pop.	±%
1921	2,054	+1.8%
1931	1,889	−8.0%
1936	1,820	−3.7%
1951	2,179	+19.7%
1961	2,492	+14.4%

Year	Pop.	±%
1971	3,149	+26.4%
1981	3,485	+10.7%
1991	3,556	+2.0%
2001	4,163	+17.1%

Source: Data from ISTAT

== Twin towns ==
Mornago is twinned with:

- Naxxar, Malta

== Neighboring municipalities ==
- Vergiate 5.6 km (3.5 mi)
- Arsago Seprio 6.9 km (4.3 mi)
- Sumirago 2.5 km (1.6 mi)
- Casale Litta 2.1 km (1.3 mi)
- Crosio della Valle 1.6 km (0.99 mi)
- Besnate 5.8 km (3.6 mi)
