= Varese–Venegono Airport =

Varese-Venegono Airport Aeroporto Arturo Ferrarin
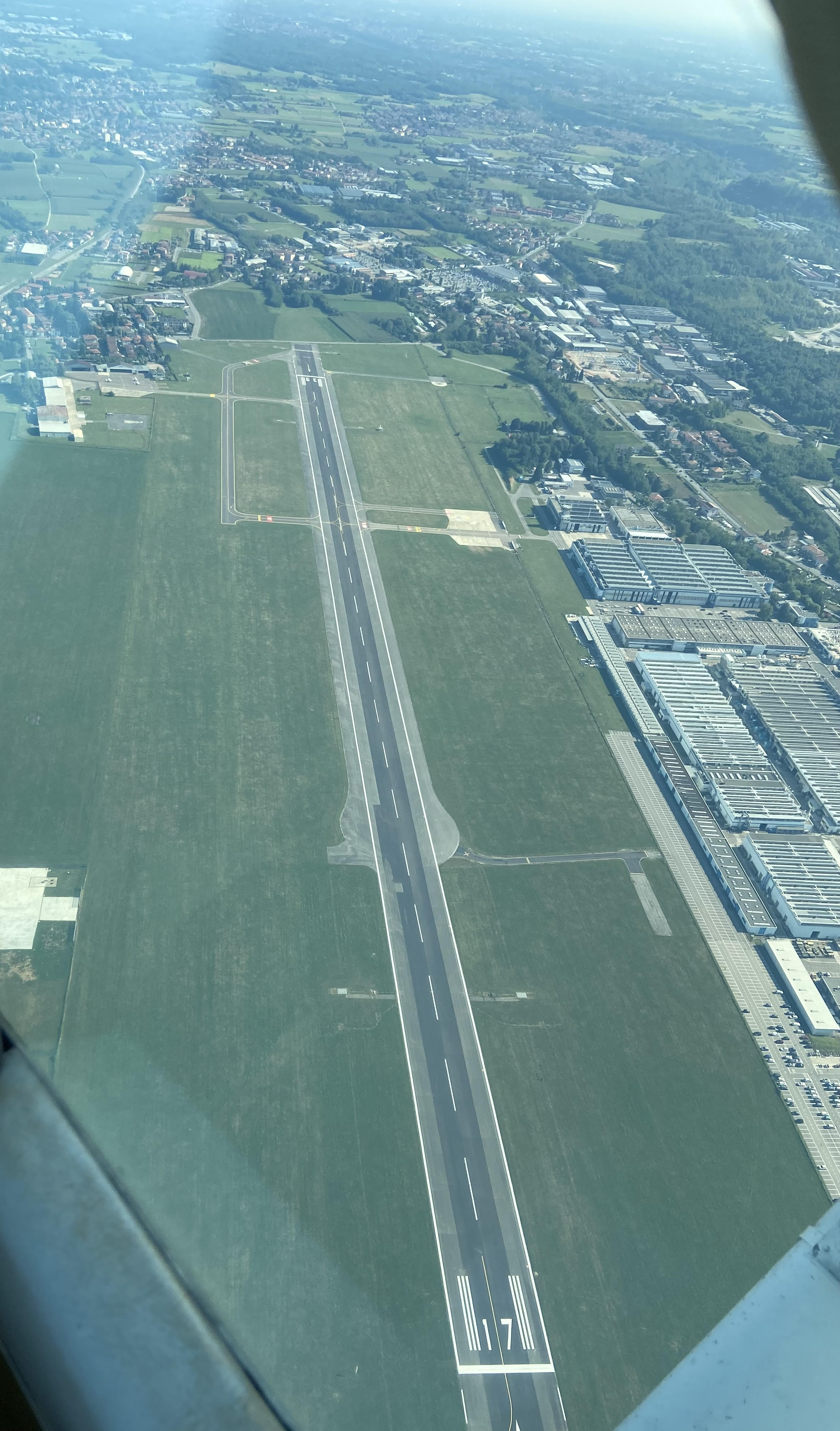
- IATA: None; ICAO: LILN

Summary
- Airport type: Military/Civil not commercial
- Operator: Aeroclub Varese
- Location: Venegono Inferiore, Italy
- Elevation AMSL: 1,105 ft / 336.8 m
- Coordinates: 45°44′29″N 008°53′12″E
- Website: AEREOCLUB Varese

Map
- Location within Italy

Runways
| Direction | Length | | Surface |
| Direction | ft | m | Surface |
|---|---|---|---|
| 35/17 | 4,665 x 131 | 1,422 x 40 | Asphalt |

Varese–Venegono Airport (IATA: None, ICAO: LILN) in an Italian airport located in Venegono Inferiore, 10 kilometres (6.2 mi) south-east from Varese, the airport is open to VFR traffic and military/civil non-commercial aircraft. The runway is used by Aeroclub Varese (Flight school and operator), Leonardo Company and the financial police of Varese.

== History ==
=== Construction and war ===
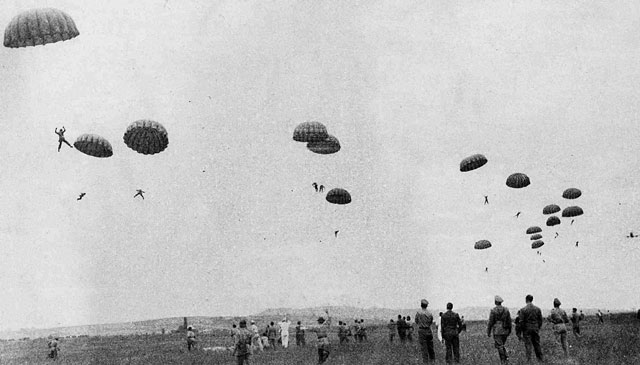
Military exercise of some paratroopers at the Venegono Airport in 1943.

The airport was born on a royal decree in the thirties as a "makeshift field" for military aircraft. Initially the airport consisted of a runway and a hangar in which some soldiers and officers were based. The infrastructural development of the airport took place during the Second World War where the airport was used as a squadron headquarters for night fighters. The "79th Squadriglia squadron" was made up of six Fiat CR42s and some Reggiane Re. 2001 fighters with the aim of defending the industrial triangle of Lombardy-Piedmont-Liguria, parachutes and military pilots were also trained in the field. After the armistice of 1943 the airport was occupied by the Germans and the Italian Social Republic, it became the seat of the "Aerosiluranti Buscaglia Group" equipped with eight Savoia-Marchetti S.M.79 "Sparviero". At the end of the war, military operations on the airport ceased, the military aircraft used were relocated and the school for training military pilots was closed.

=== After the second world war ===
The airport was in good condition and was used for gliding. At the beginning of the 1940s, the aeronautical company Macchi (aircraft manufacturer) decided to transfer a part of the production of aircraft from Malpensa to Venegono. The airport was renamed "Arturo Ferrarin" and was mainly used for testing and overhauling the de Havilland DH.100 Vampire. The complete transfer of the entire production will be completed in the 1990s.

In 1948 Aeroclub Varese was born and began to train numerous commercial civil pilots for Alitalia and private pilots. During the 1950s, Aermacchi began production of the Aermacchi MB326, the trainer aircraft that sanctioned the company's success, all test flights were carried out at Venegono airport and this led to an improvement of the runway and facilities.

In 1988 the air section of the "Guardia di Finanza of Varese" (Financial Polcie) moved to the airport.

=== Arturo Ferrarin ===
The airport was renamed "Aeroporto Arturo Ferrarin" in homage to the Italian pilot. Arturo Ferrarin was a fighter pilot during the World War I and enrolled in the Royal Italian Army air service in 1916. In 1923 he was absorbed into Italy's Regia Aeronautica. He served principally as a test pilot, but also as a participant at various international air competitions. He died in 1941 when a prototype aircraft that he was testing crashed at Guidonia, Italy.

== Usage ==
The airport is used simultaneously by Leonardo (aircraft and helicopter division), Aeroclub Varese and the aera section of the Guardia di Finanza. Most of the traffic operating there is made up of the aircraft of the Varese Aeroclub.

=== Leonardo Aircraft division ===
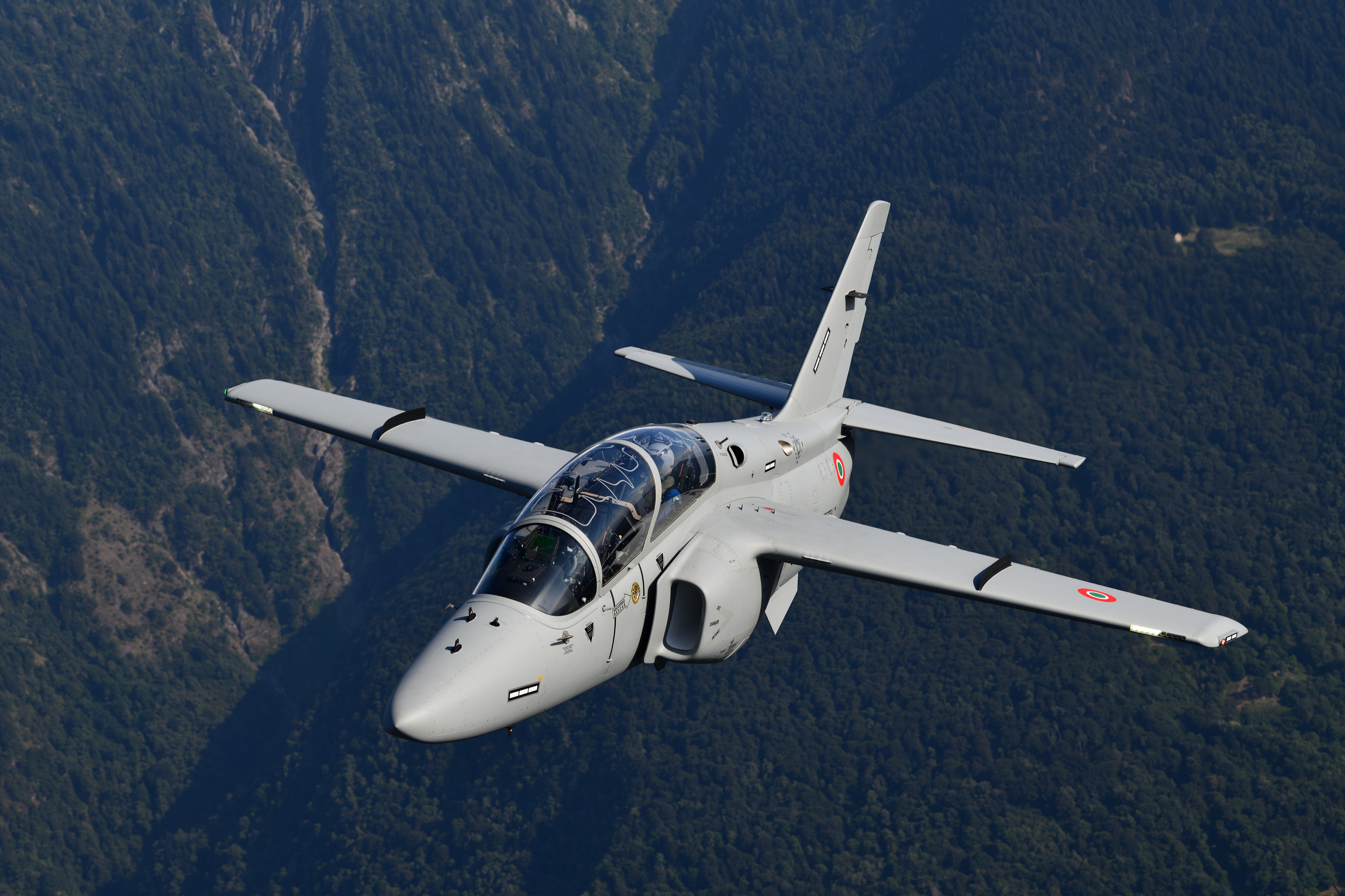
M345 prodotto da Leonardo.

In 2016 the Aermacchi was renamed Leonardo company. The one present in Venegono became "Leonardo Aircraft division", in addition to the overhaul of some military aircraft, the company deals with the production and testing of Aermacchi M345 and Aermacchi M346. The company occupies a large part of the airport grounds and is located west of the runway. The Leonardo Helicopters Division, based in Vergiate, uses the Venegono airport to test the radio equipment on board the new helicopters.

=== Varese Aeroclub ===
The flight school uses the airport as its main base for the training and maintenance of its aircraft. The fleet consists of 15 diversified aircraft including Piper and Cessna, as well as two certified flight simulators. The aeroclub occupies the south-east part of the airport.

=== Guardia di Finanza Air Section ===
Formerly known as the "Flight Department of the Guardia di Finanza", in 2012 it took the name of the "Air section of the Guardia di Finanza of Varese". It is located north-east of the field and operates exclusively with helicopters. The current structure of the Air Section consists of a Senior Officer who holds command of the department; a staff composed of about 40 soldiers depends on it, divided into an Operational Nucleus, an Efficiency Nucleus and a Command Squad. The office is able to train pilots and maintain helicopters. The main task is that of aerial exploration, transport and competition in search and rescue operations. The service district includes Lombardy, Piedmont and Valle d'Aosta, the provinces of Asti and Alessandria are excluded. The total area of the covered territory is 52,404 km^{2} (20,233 mi^{2}), and the border line to be protected is 1,237 km (769 mi), of which 780 km (480 mi) is non-European Union (Switzerland).

== Technical data ==
=== Classification and hours of activity ===
The airport is classified as military open to non-commercial civilian traffic. Any external traffic operation must be agreed with the operator. The airport is open according to local ephemeris from sunrise to sunset.

=== Airspace ===
The airport is not controlled, has its own ATZ class "G" and is located within a regulatory zone (LI R-81). The ATZ has a cylindrical shape with the upper limit set at 2500 feet and 1.2 NM radius. The radio service is provided by Leonardo Velivoli and Aeroclub Varese.

=== Regulated area (LI-R81) ===
Elevated up to 1500 feet AGL (2500 feet on the altimeter), the area remains active from Monday to Friday from sunrise to sunset; on Saturday 0700 / z-1400 / z (0600 / z-1300 / z). However, it is not active on holidays. Inside, civil VFR traffic is prohibited, with the exception of the aircraft of the Varese Aeroclub and of interest to Leonardo Company.

=== Runway ===
The runway, in asphalt, is oriented 35/17 (QFU 353 ° / 173 °) is 1,422 m (4,665 ft) long and 40 m (130 ft) wide. The preferred runway for operations is 35, this is also equipped with a ILS system whose use is limited solely and exclusively to Leonardo aircraft. The elevation of runway 35 is 326 m (1,068 ft).

=== Pattern activity and local restrictions ===
The traffic circuit is built to the west of the field at the following altitudes:

- Jet aircraft not in excess of 2500 ft QNH / 1400 ft AGL
- Conventional aircraft and helicopters not in excess of 2000 ft QNH / 900 ft AGL

The following restrictions apply:

- Operations must be coordinated with the Varese Aeroclub for civil aircraft and with Leonardo Company for military and civil aircraft of interest to Leonardo Company;
- Local activities are allowed only after the "briefing" on local procedures;
- In case of unavailability of the DME 'MMP', or in case of simultaneous unavailability of the VOR 'MMP' and of the NDB 'MMP', the activity will be suspended by the airport operator.
- Aircraft bound for Venegono are obliged to listen and speak to Venegono radio or in the absence of the service with blind transmission before affecting the LI-R81 and the ATZ of VARESE / Venegono and to continue as provided above.
- All Leonardo Company and State flights will have priority over other traffic;
- No more than four aircraft may operate on the circuit and must declare that they are in sight of each other;
- Any other traffic not belonging to the Aeroclub Varese and in field training activities must, in advance, coordinate schedules and procedures with the same Aeroclub;
- The pilots must listen continuously on the Venegono radio frequency, transmitting the report on the critical positions in the circuit: takeoff leg, crosswind, downwind, base turn, base and final, as well as reports on the critical positions on the maneuvering area, waiting position, take-off and any activity on the runway.

=== Communications ===
The 128.555 MHz channel is assigned for the needs of General Aviation, Leonardo Company and the Varese Aeroclub. This channel must not be used for ATS purposes.
