= Ternate, Lombardy =

Ternate Ternà
- Comune
- Comune di Ternate

- Location within Italy Location within Lombardy
- Coordinates: 45°47′N 8°42′E
- Country: Italy
- Region: Lombardy
- Province: Province of Varese (VA)

Area
  - Total: 5.1 km^{2} (2.0 sq mi)
- Elevation: 281 m (922 ft)

Population (Dec. 2004)
  - Total: 2,270
  - Density: 450/km^{2} (1,200/sq mi)
- Time zone: UTC+1 (CET)
  - Summer (DST): UTC+2 (CEST)
- Postal code: 21020
- Dialing code: 0332
- Website: Official website

Ternate (Lombard: Ternà) is a comune (municipality) in the Province of Varese in the Italian region Lombardy, located about 50 kilometres (31 mi) northwest of Milan and about 11 kilometres (7 mi) southwest of Varese. As of 31 December 2004, it had a population of 2,270 and an area of 5.1 square kilometres (2.0 mi^{2}).

Ternate borders the following municipalities: Biandronno, Cazzago Brabbia, Comabbio, Inarzo, Travedona-Monate, Varano Borghi.

== Demographic evolution ==
Historical population

Year	Pop.	±%
1861	802	—
1871	945	+17.8%
1881	985	+4.2%
1901	1,118	+13.5%
1911	1,035	−7.4%

Year	Pop.	±%
1921	1,012	−2.2%
1931	999	−1.3%
1936	951	−4.8%
1951	1,170	+23.0%
1961	1,304	+11.5%

Year	Pop.	±%
1971	2,154	+65.2%
1981	2,305	+7.0%
1991	2,293	−0.5%
2001	2,254	−1.7%

Source: Data from ISTAT
