= Comabbio =

- Comune
- Comune di Comabbio
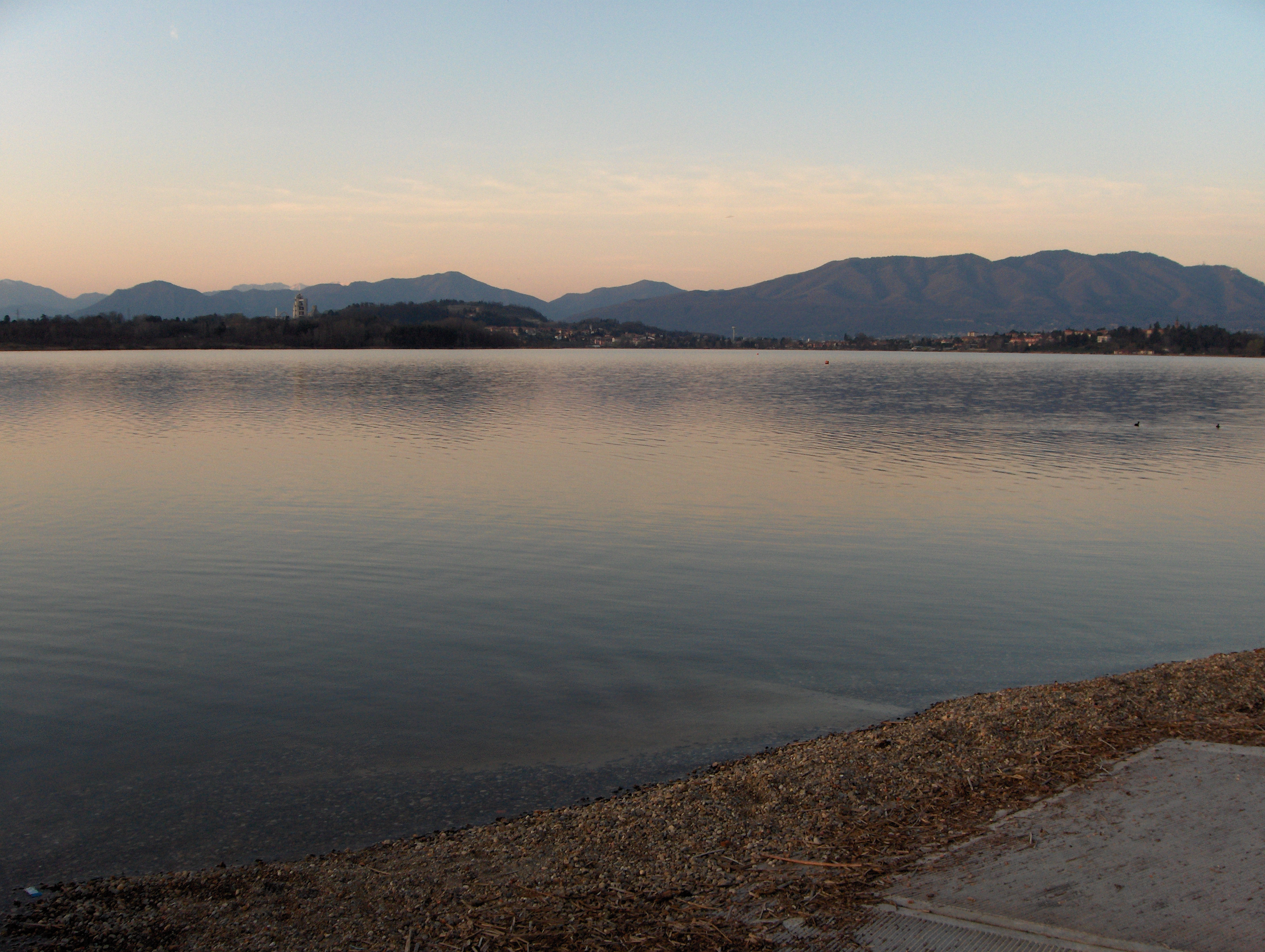
- Lago di Comabbio

- Location within Italy Location within Lombardy
- Coordinates: 45°46′N 8°41′E
- Country: Italy
- Region: Lombardy
- Province: Province of Varese (VA)

Government
  - Mayor: Alessandro Grotti

Area
  - Total: 4.8 km^{2} (1.9 sq mi)

Population (Dec. 2004)
  - Total: 1,025
  - Density: 210/km^{2} (550/sq mi)
- Time zone: UTC+1 (CET)
  - Summer (DST): UTC+2 (CEST)
- Postal code: 21020
- Dialing code: 0331

Comabbio is a comune (municipality) in the Province of Varese in the Italian region Lombardy, located about 50 kilometres (31 mi) northwest of Milan and about 13 kilometres (8 mi) southwest of Varese. On 31 December 2004, it had a population of 1,025 and an area of 4.8 square kilometres (1.9 mi^{2}).

Comabbio borders the following municipalities: Mercallo, Osmate, Sesto Calende, Ternate, Travedona-Monate, Varano Borghi, Vergiate.

== Demographic evolution ==
Historical population

Year	Pop.	±%
1861	593	—
1871	739	+24.6%
1881	719	−2.7%
1901	695	−3.3%
1911	644	−7.3%

Year	Pop.	±%
1921	597	−7.3%
1931	568	−4.9%
1936	525	−7.6%
1951	580	+10.5%
1961	693	+19.5%

Year	Pop.	±%
1971	811	+17.0%
1981	805	−0.7%
1991	849	+5.5%
2001	958	+12.8%

Source: Data from ISTAT
