= Mercallo =

- Comune
- Comune di Mercallo
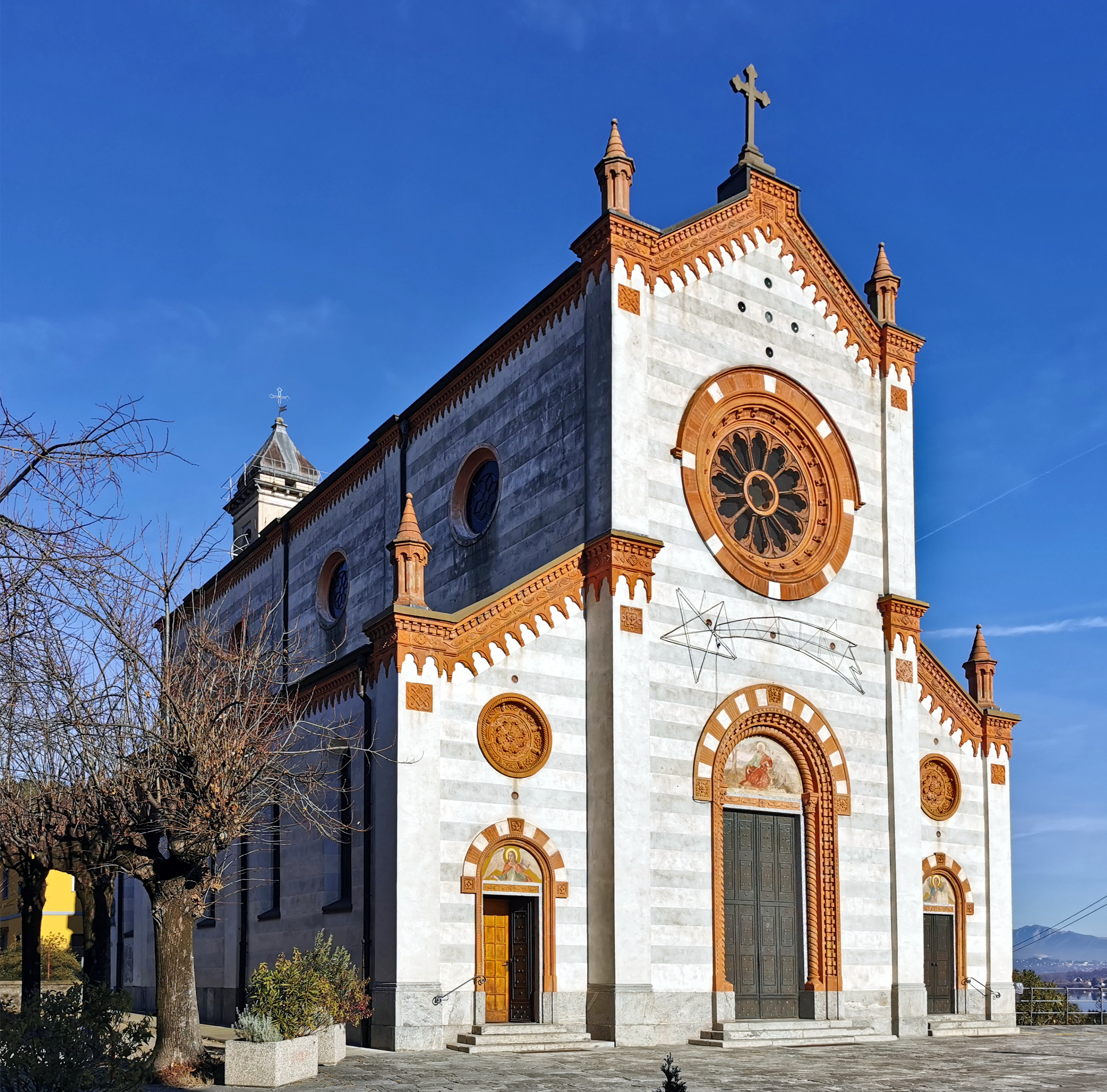
- Church of San Giovanni Evangelista in Mercallo

- Location within Italy Location within Lombardy
- Coordinates: 45°45′N 8°40′E
- Country: Italy
- Region: Lombardy
- Province: Province of Varese (VA)

Area
  - Total: 5.3 km^{2} (2.0 sq mi)

Population (Dec. 2004)
  - Total: 1,761
  - Density: 330/km^{2} (860/sq mi)
- Time zone: UTC+1 (CET)
  - Summer (DST): UTC+2 (CEST)
- Postal code: 21020
- Dialing code: 0331

Mercallo is a comune (municipality) in the Province of Varese in the Italian region Lombardy, located about 50 kilometres (31 mi) northwest of Milan and about 15 kilometres (9 mi) southwest of Varese. As of 31 December 2004, it had a population of 1,761 and an area of 5.3 square kilometres (2.0 mi^{2}).

Mercallo borders the following municipalities: Comabbio, Sesto Calende, Varano Borghi, Vergiate.

== Demographic evolution ==
Historical population

Year	Pop.	±%
1861	543	—
1871	679	+25.0%
1881	686	+1.0%
1901	801	+16.8%
1911	803	+0.2%

Year	Pop.	±%
1921	862	+7.3%
1931	778	−9.7%
1936	806	+3.6%
1951	891	+10.5%
1961	1,051	+18.0%

Year	Pop.	±%
1971	1,376	+30.9%
1981	1,536	+11.6%
1991	1,563	+1.8%
2001	1,679	+7.4%

Source: Data from ISTAT
