= Ternate (disambiguation) =

Ternate is an island city in North Maluku, Indonesia.

Ternate may also refer to:

- Ternate language, a North Halmahera language spoken on the island of Ternate
- Ternate people, a North Moluccan ethnic group
- Ternate Malay or North Moluccan Malay, a Malay-based creole language
- Sultanate of Ternate based on the Indonesian island of Ternate
- Ternate, Cavite, a municipality in the Philippines
- Ternate, Lombardy, a municipality in Italy
- Ternate (1801 EIC ship), a 16-gun brig of the Bombay Marine that served the British East India Company from 1801 to c. 1838.
- Ternate (or trifoliate) leaf structure, such as clover or poison ivy
