= Biandronno =

- Comune
- Comune di Biandronno
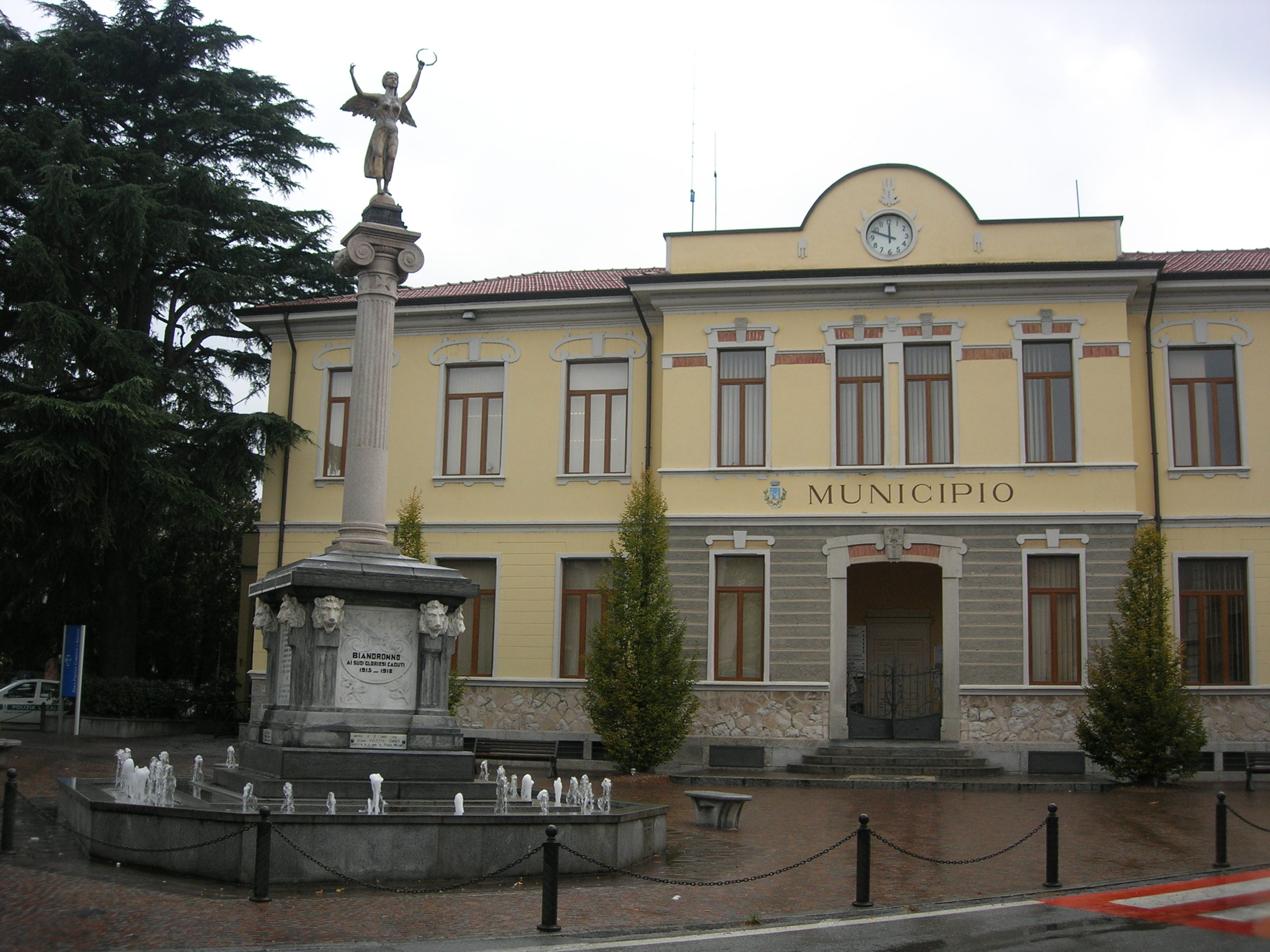
- View of Biandronno

- Location within Italy Location within Lombardy
- Coordinates: 45°49′N 08°43′E
- Country: Italy
- Region: Lombardy
- Province: Varese (VA)
- Frazioni: Cassinetta

Area
  - Total: 8 km^{2} (3.1 sq mi)
- Elevation: 252 m (827 ft)

Population (2018-01-01)
  - Total: 3,102
  - Density: 390/km^{2} (1,000/sq mi)
- Demonym: Biandronnesi
- Time zone: UTC+1 (CET)
  - Summer (DST): UTC+2 (CEST)
- Postal code: 21024
- Dialing code: 0332
- Patron saint: San Lorenzo
- Saint day: 10 August
- Website: Official website

Biandronno is a town and comune (municipality) located in the province of Varese, in the Lombardy region of northern Italy.
