= Azzate =

- Comune
- Comune di Azzate
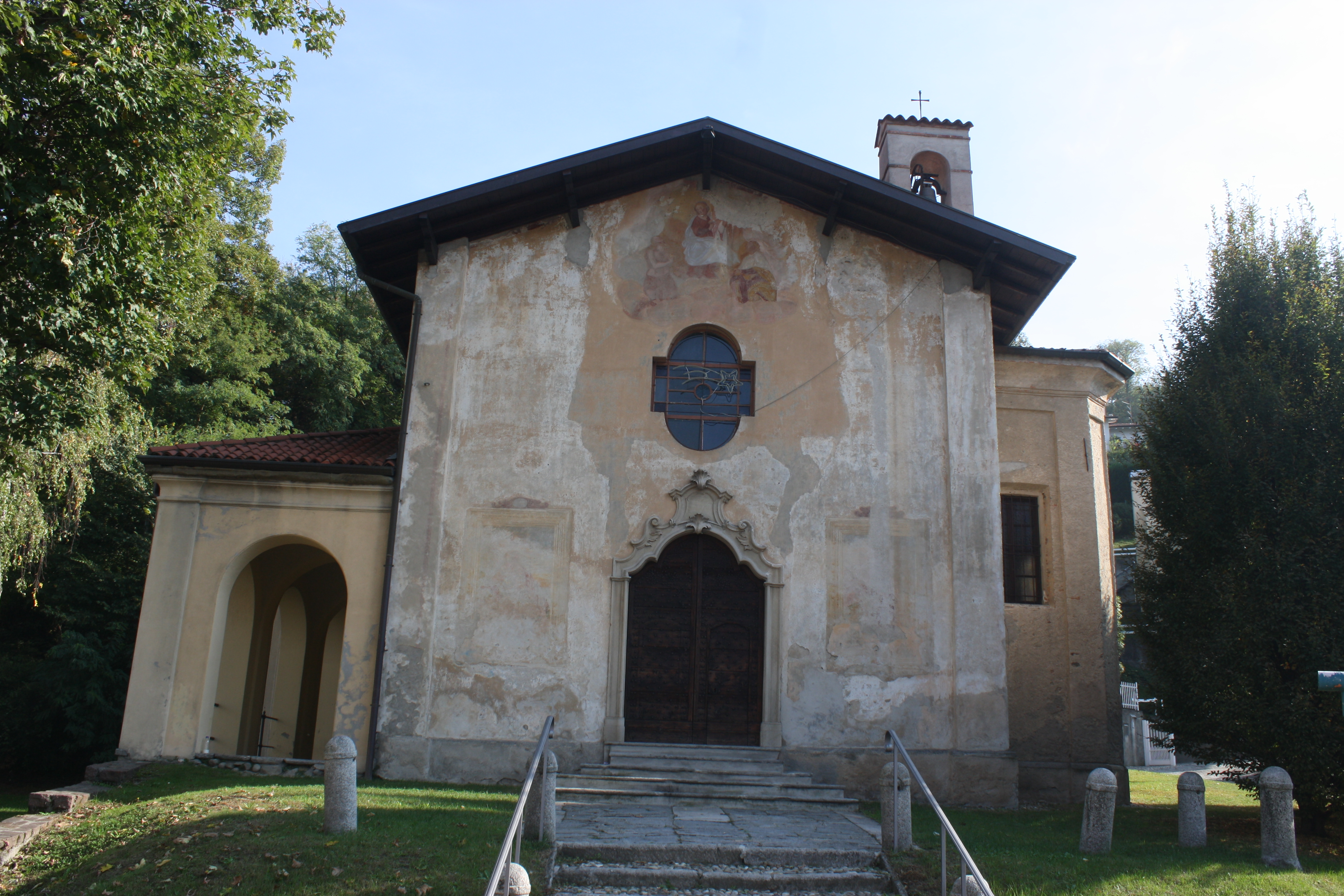
- Chiesa di San Rocco, Azzate

- Coat of arms

- Location within Italy Location within Lombardy
- Coordinates: 45°47′N 08°48′E
- Country: Italy
- Region: Lombardy
- Province: Varese (VA)

Government
  - Mayor: Giovanni Nicora (since 13 June 2004)

Area
  - Total: 4 km^{2} (1.5 sq mi)

Population (2018-01-01)
  - Total: 3,820
  - Density: 960/km^{2} (2,500/sq mi)
- Demonym: Azzatesi
- Time zone: UTC+1 (CET)
  - Summer (DST): UTC+2 (CEST)
- Postal code: 21022
- Dialing code: 0332
- Patron saint: San Andrea
- Website: Official website

Azzate is a town and comune (municipality) located in the province of Varese, in the Lombardy region of northern Italy.
