= Bodio Lomnago =

- Comune
- Comune di Bodio Lomnago
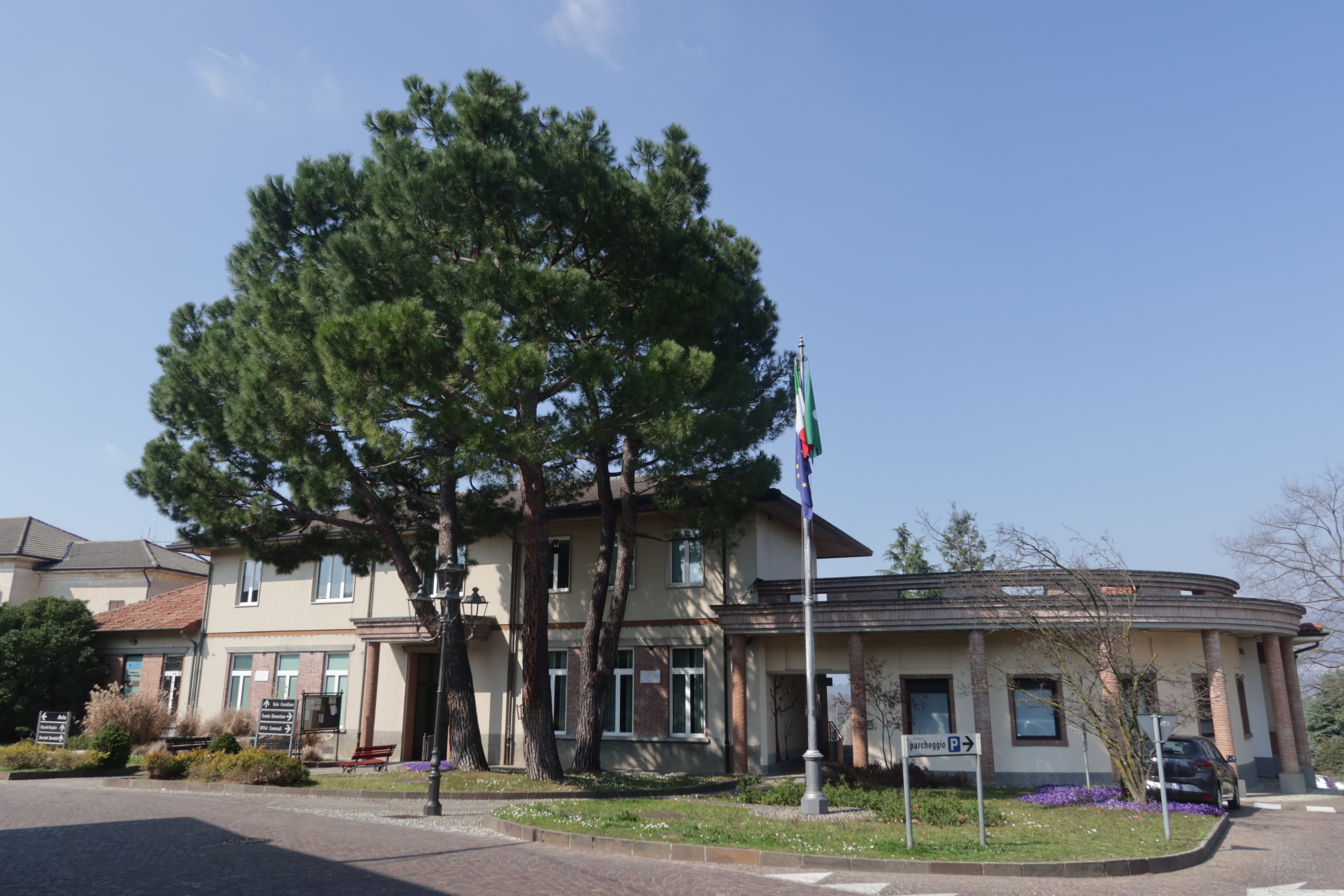
- View of Bodio Lomnago

- Coat of arms

- Location within Italy Location within Lombardy
- Coordinates: 45°47′N 08°45′E
- Country: Italy
- Region: Lombardy
- Province: Varese (VA)
- Frazioni: Rogorella, Lomnago, Boffalora, Pizzo, Porto, Roccolo

Government
  - Mayor: Eleonora Paolelli

Area
  - Total: 4 km^{2} (1.5 sq mi)
- Elevation: 275 m (902 ft)

Population (2018-01-01)
  - Total: 2,190
  - Density: 550/km^{2} (1,400/sq mi)
- Demonym: Bodiesi
- Time zone: UTC+1 (CET)
  - Summer (DST): UTC+2 (CEST)
- Postal code: 21020
- Dialing code: 0332
- ISTAT code: 012016
- Patron saint: Sant'Anna
- Saint day: 26 July
- Website: Official website

Bodio Lomnago is a comune (municipality) in the province of Varese, in the Italian region of Lombardy.

Bodio Lomnago is composed of two villages: Bodio, the biggest one closer to the lake and Lomnago, uphill toward the Monte Rogorella. Both villages have certainly a pre-Roman origin, probably Celtic or Gaulish.

== Main sights ==
In Bodio:

- San Crocifisso, a small Romanesque church of the primitive village, recently renovated
- Santa Maria church, a Baroque building from 1512
- Villa Beltrami-Gadola (formerly Bossi), with its distinctive tower

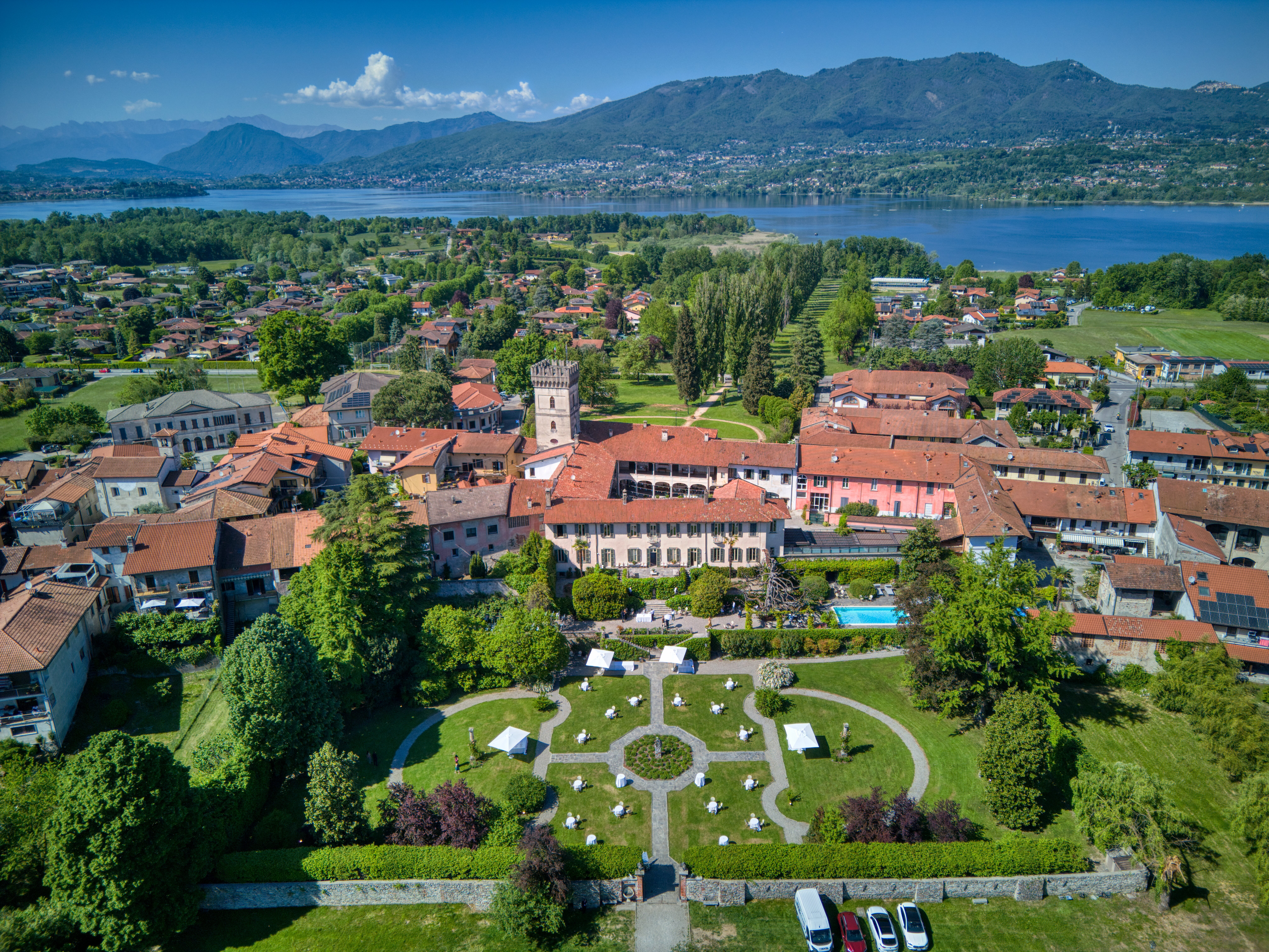
Villa Gadola-Beltrami (formerly Bossi)

In Lomnago:

- San Giorgio, an unusual Norman-style church built in the 19th century
- Villa Puricelli, with its huge park and the ancient hidden icehouse

== World Heritage Site ==
It is home to one or more prehistoric pile-dwelling (or stilt house) settlements that are part of the Prehistoric Pile dwellings around the Alps UNESCO World Heritage Site.
